= Kocievians =

Ethnocultural group in Central Europe

Kociewiacy (Polish)
- Flag of Kociewie, one of the symbols of Kocievian people.

Regions with significant populations
- Poland (Kociewie)

Languages
- Kociewie dialect (Polish)

Religion
- Predominantly Roman Catholic

Related ethnic groups
- Kuyavians; Tuchola Borowians; Greater Poland people

The Kocievians (Polish: Kociewiacy), are an ethnographic group of Polish people indigenous to the ethnocultural region of Kociewie in northern Poland, administratively divided between the voivodeships of Pomerania and Kuyavia–Pomerania. They speak the Kociewian dialect of Polish.

== Identity ==
The Kociewians are a regional ethnographical group. In the 2011 census, 3065 individuals declared themselves as Kociewians (3053 combined this identification with Polish identification – they stated that they were Polish, but emphasized their Kociewie region), an increase since the census of 2002, when nobody identified as such. The Kociewian identity can be seen in opposition to the nearby Kashubs who inhabit the area to the north of Kociewie. The two dialects are mutually unintelligible, and the cultural and personal identities of Kociewians is often constructed vis-à-vis such differences.

== Language ==
The Kociewian dialect, unlike the nearby Kashubian, is mostly intelligible with mainstream Polish language. Despite geographic proximity, these two dialects are very dissimilar, with Kociewian being much closer to Kuyavian, to the point of some scholars calling it a variant of that dialect. The IETF language tags have assigned the variant pl-kociewie to the Kociewian dialect of Polish.

=== Kociewian anthem ===
On 7 March 2003 the Hymn Kociewski, penned by the ethnographer Bernard Sychta, was adopted by the Kongres Kociewski (Kociewian Congress) as the Kociewian anthem:

"Pytasz sia dzie Kociewiaki
majó swoje dómy.
Swe pachnónce chlybam pola,
swoje sochy, bruny.
Dzie Wierzyca, Wda
przy śrebrnym fal śpsiywie,
Niesó woda w dal,
tam nasze Kociewie."

Kociewian anthem sung by a youth folk club from Pelplin

== Culture ==
=== National events ===
International Kociewie Day (Światowy Dzień Kociewia) is an annual celebration taking place on 10 February. The date is commemorated as the first known mention of Kociewia in the historical record.

Various towns across the region also hold independent celebrations of Kociewian culture including the annual Kociewian Day (Dzień Kociewski) held in Nowe and the Festival of Kociewie (Święto Kociewia) which takes place annually in Tczew.

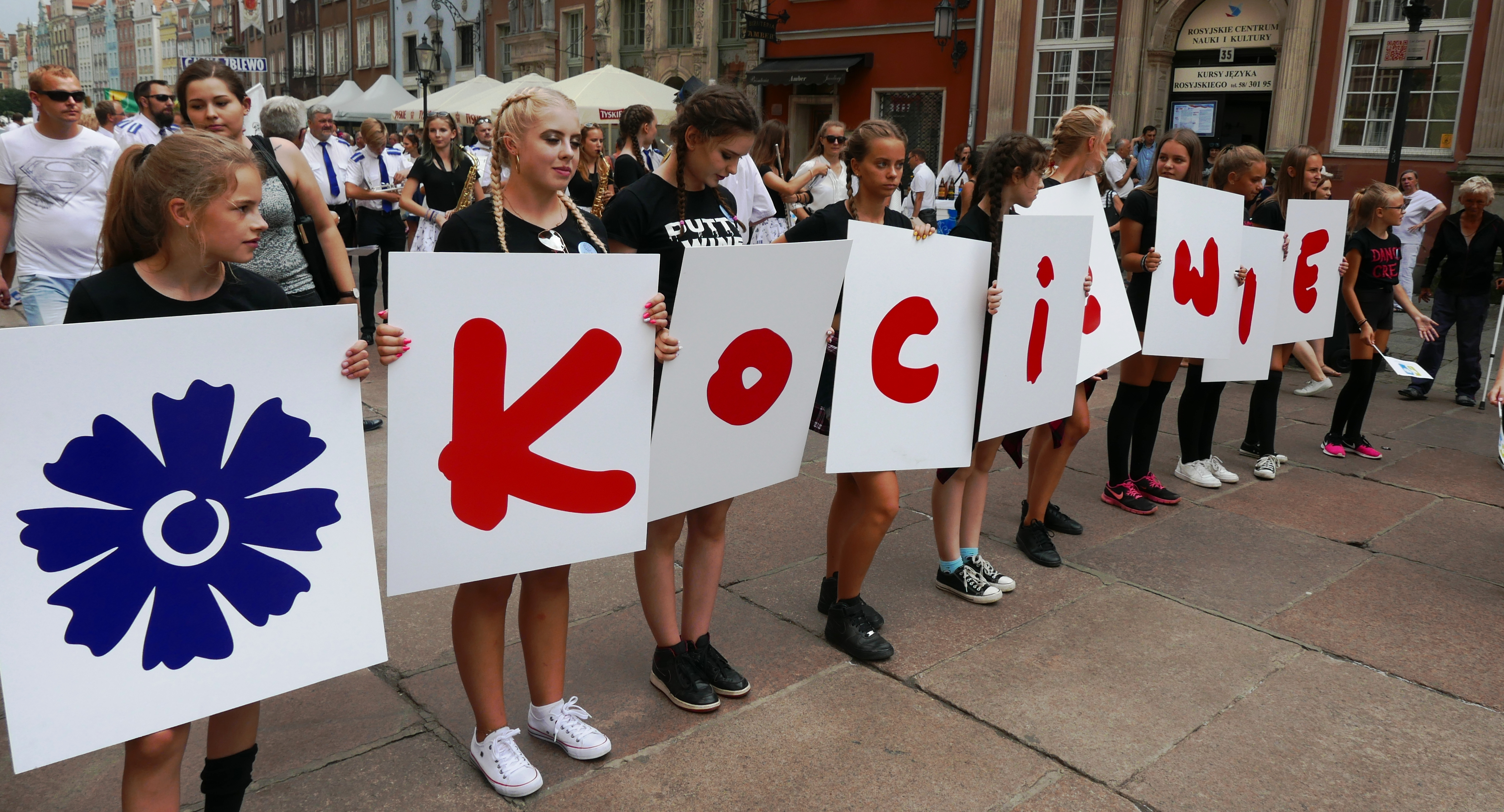
Parade on Długa Street during the Festival of Kociewia in Gdańsk

The Kociewian Congress (Kongres Kociewski) is a periodic event held since 1995 which takes place in Tczew. At the sixth Congress in 2022 a competition to design a national flag was announced.

In 2023 the first joint Kashubian-Kociewian Congress of Self-Government was instituted. The Congress took place on 22 July in Wejherowo and invited guests included the then Polish prime minister Mateusz Morawiecki.

=== Institutions ===
In 1956 the Kashubian–Pomeranian Association was founded, which has since come to represent the cultural and political interests of Kociewians alongside those of their neighbouring Kashubians.

The city of Starogard Gdański is home to the Museum of Kociewie Land (Muzeum Ziemi Kociewskiej) which displays historical and ethnographic exhibits related to the region. The museum has a research library and hosts regular educational and cultural events.

The Centre of Kociewian Culture (Centrum Kultury Kociewskiej), located in Lalkowy, focuses on the industrial and agricultural heritage of the region.

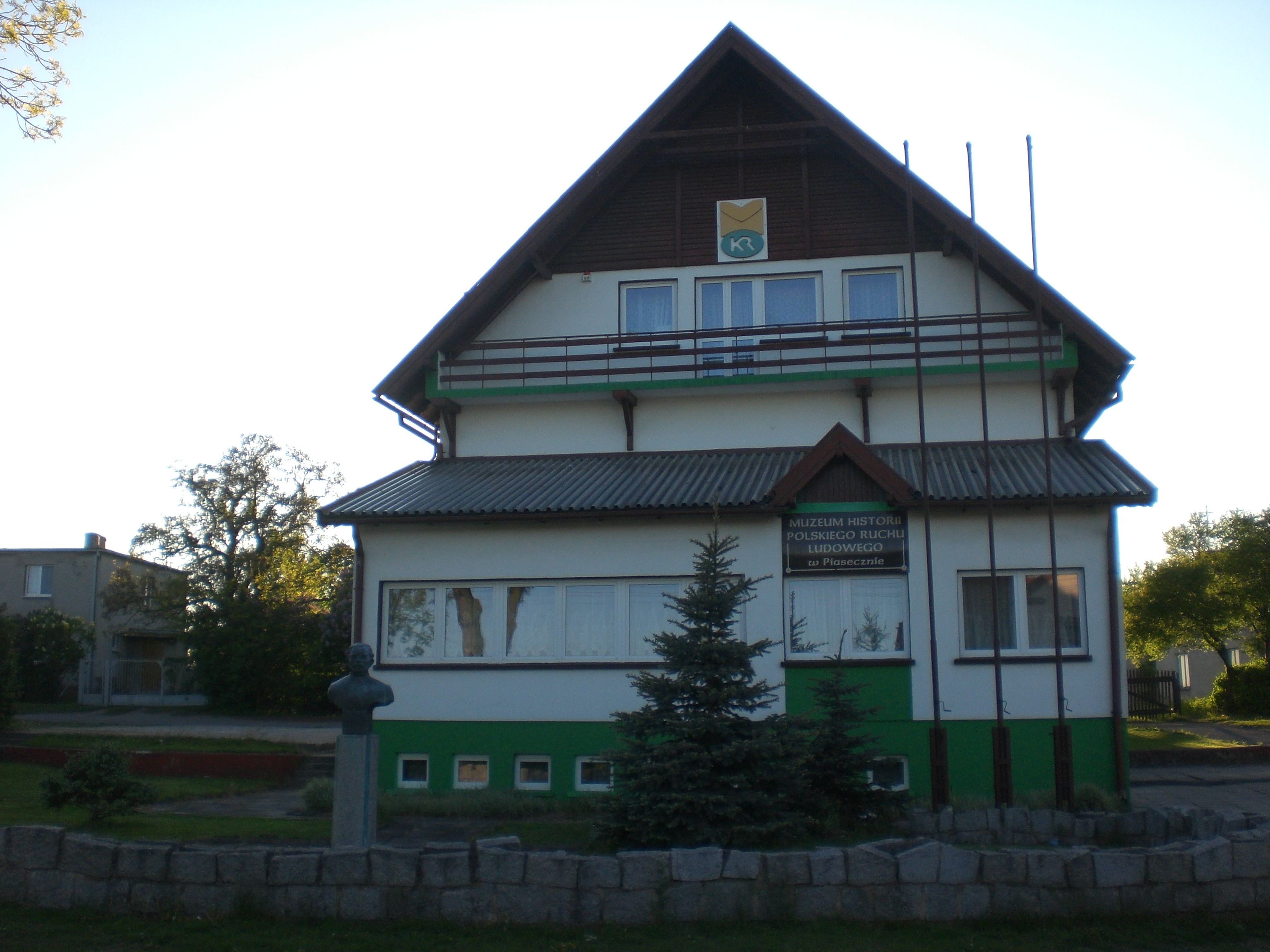
Museum of the History of the Polish Peasant Movement in Piaseczno

The Museum of the History of the Polish Peasant Movement (Muzeum Historii Polskiego Ruchu Ludowego) in Piaseczno houses a collection of agricultural artefacts from the Kociewian region.

=== Music ===
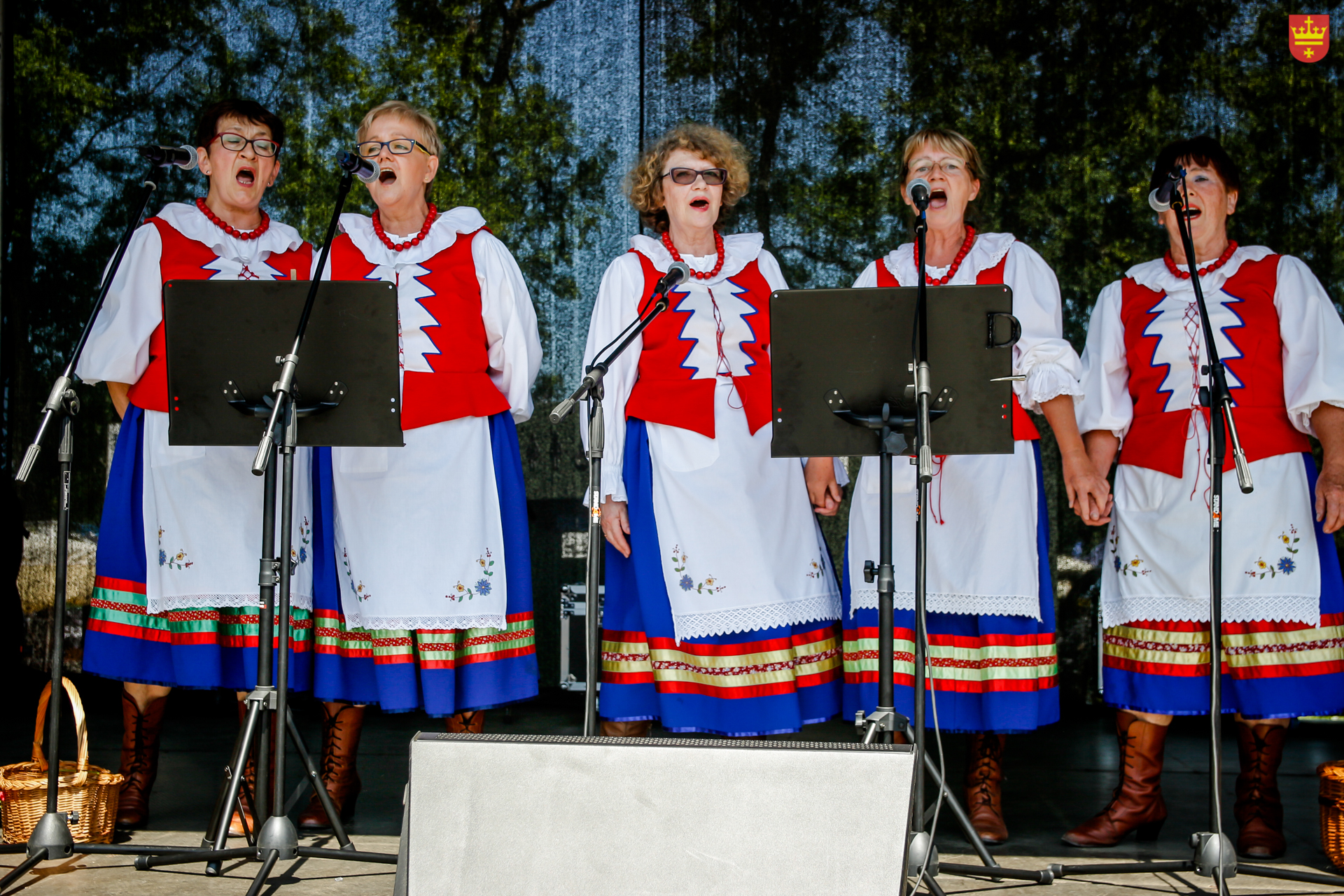
A group of performers in traditional Kocievian dress, 2019

The Festival of Kociewian Folk is an annual music event which takes place in Piaseczno.

=== Sports ===
The ethnocultural identity of Kociewia has been adopted by various football teams including KP Starogard Gdański, Unia Tczew, and Wisła Tczew all of which have taken on the moniker Duma Kociewia (Pride of Kociewie) as club nicknames. The basketball club SKS Starogard Gdański has the nickname Kociewskie diabły (Kociewian Devils), while the athletics club LLKS Ziemi Kociewskiej Skórcz incorporates the region's identity into their club name as did the now defunct sports association KS Agro-Kociewie Starogard Gdański.

=== Traditions ===
Pultrowanie is a common Kociewian custom whereby neighbours and guests will smash glass on the doorstep of the bride's house the evening before her wedding.

== Religion ==
=== Roman Catholics ===
In 2023 Gazeta Wyborcza reported on a steep decline in the number of practicing Roman Catholics in Kociewie. Figures from the Pelplin diocese showed a 10.5% fall in those attending mass between 2019 - 2021 and a 4.5% drop in those receiving communion during the same period.

=== Lutherans ===
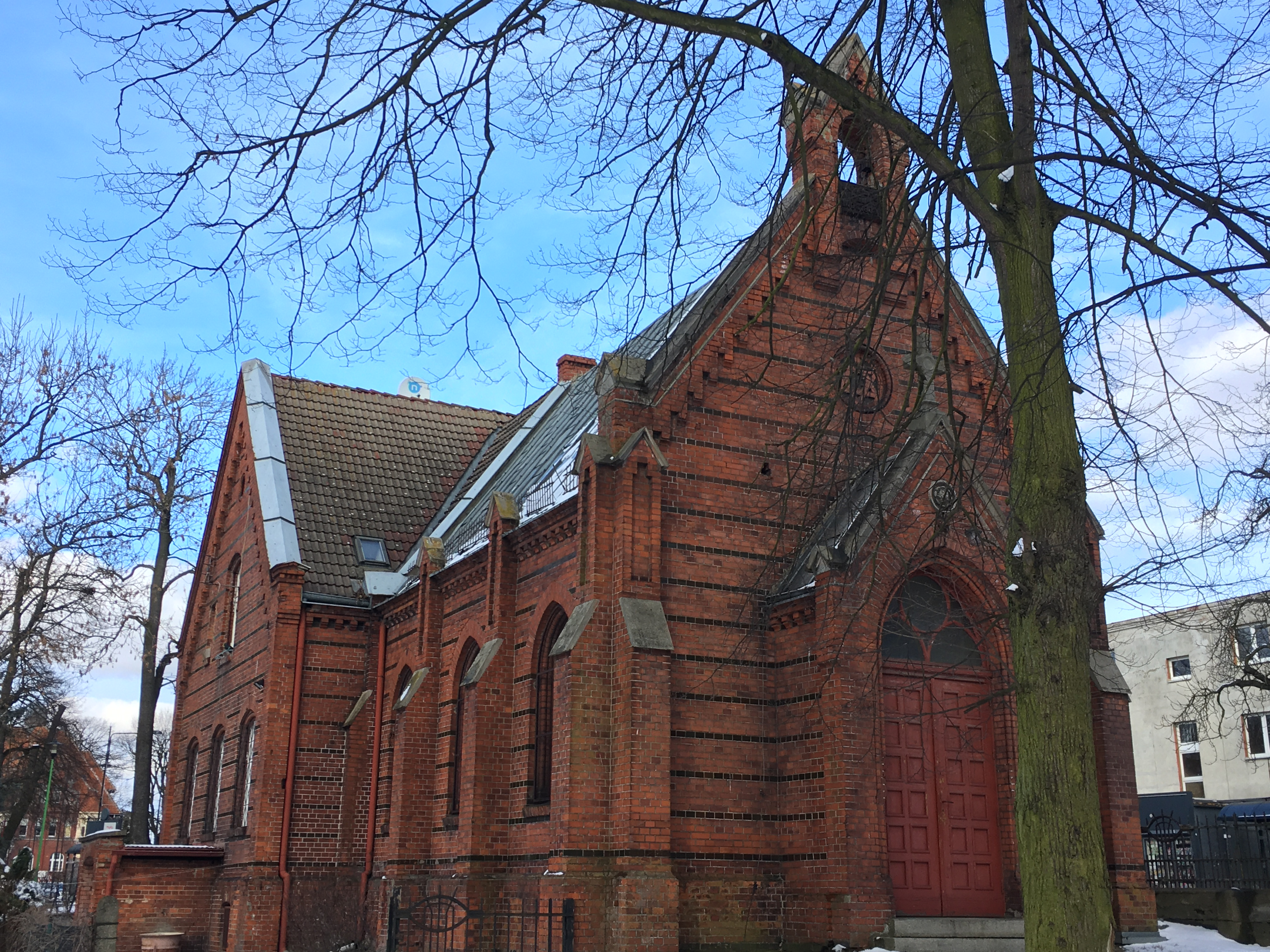
Lutheran church in Tczew

The Kociewian lands under the Jagiellonian monarchy proved to be fertile ground for the Reformation in the 16th century. Protestant congregations were founded in urban centres including Gniew, Skarszewy, Starogard, and Tczew, alongside rural areas such as Rudno. Although the Counter-Reformation would force many Lutheran congregations into makeshift churches, it was not as severe in Kociewie as elsewhere in Royal Prussia. Following WWII Lutheran congregations in Kociewie were heavily reduced in number and services were disrupted. In the town of Tczew public services did not resume until the 1960s.

=== Mennonites ===
During the 16th century Mennonites began to settle within the lands of the Polish-Lithuanian Commonwealth from Western European provinces particularly the Netherlands. A combination of socio-economic factors and persecution in their home countries encouraged the settlement of new villages along the Vistula. Mennonites inhabited the area of Kociewie around Świecie, where a prayer house was established in Przechówko, from the mid-1500s. In the 18th century a new Mennonite colony was founded in Jeziorki in response to increasing restrictions on the practice of religion in Świecie. Following the Partitions the Mennonite population of Kociewie began to decline with the communities in Przechówka and Jeziorki ceasing to exist by the mid-19th century. At the end of WWII the majority of remaining Mennonites in Kociewie became refugees, fleeing west to Germany and the Americas.

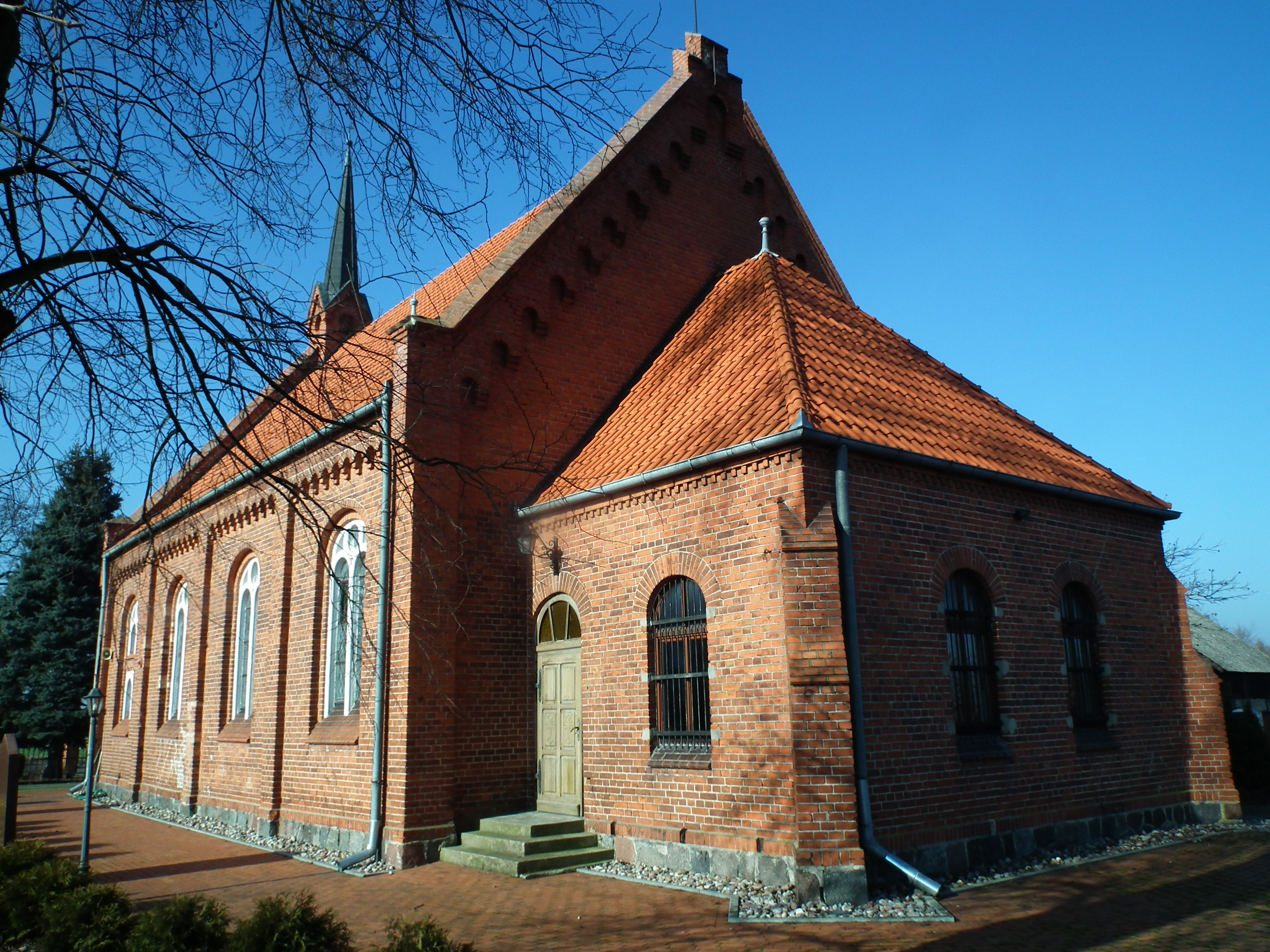
Former Mennonite church in Mątawy

Evidence of Mennonite presence in Kociewie has survived into the 21st century in the form of flood defences and wetland management systems. A Mennonite cemetery still remains in Dolna Grupa and a typical Mennonite timber-framed house is preserved in Chrystkowo. The village of Mątawy retains a 19th-century Mennonite church and several Mennonite buildings. The villages of Bratwin, Dragacz, Wielki Lubień, Wielkie Stwolno and Wielkie Zajączkowo also have existing Mennonite architecture which have become something of a local tourist attraction.

== Diaspora ==
People of Kociewian heritage are known to inhabit areas of Poland outside of the ehtnolinguistic region of Kociewie. A 2006 ethnographic survey found that 4% of the population of the town of Puck in northern Poland identified as being Kociewian to some degree.
