= Grupa =

Grupa may refer to:

- Grupa, Kuyavian-Pomeranian Voivodeship, village in the administrative district of Gmina Dragacz, within Świecie County, Kuyavian-Pomeranian Voivodeship, in north-central Poland
- Grupa-Osiedle, village in the administrative district of Gmina Dragacz, within Świecie County, Kuyavian-Pomeranian Voivodeship, in north-central Poland
