= Museum of Kociewie Land =

Museum in Kociewie

- Muzeum Ziemi Kociewskiej

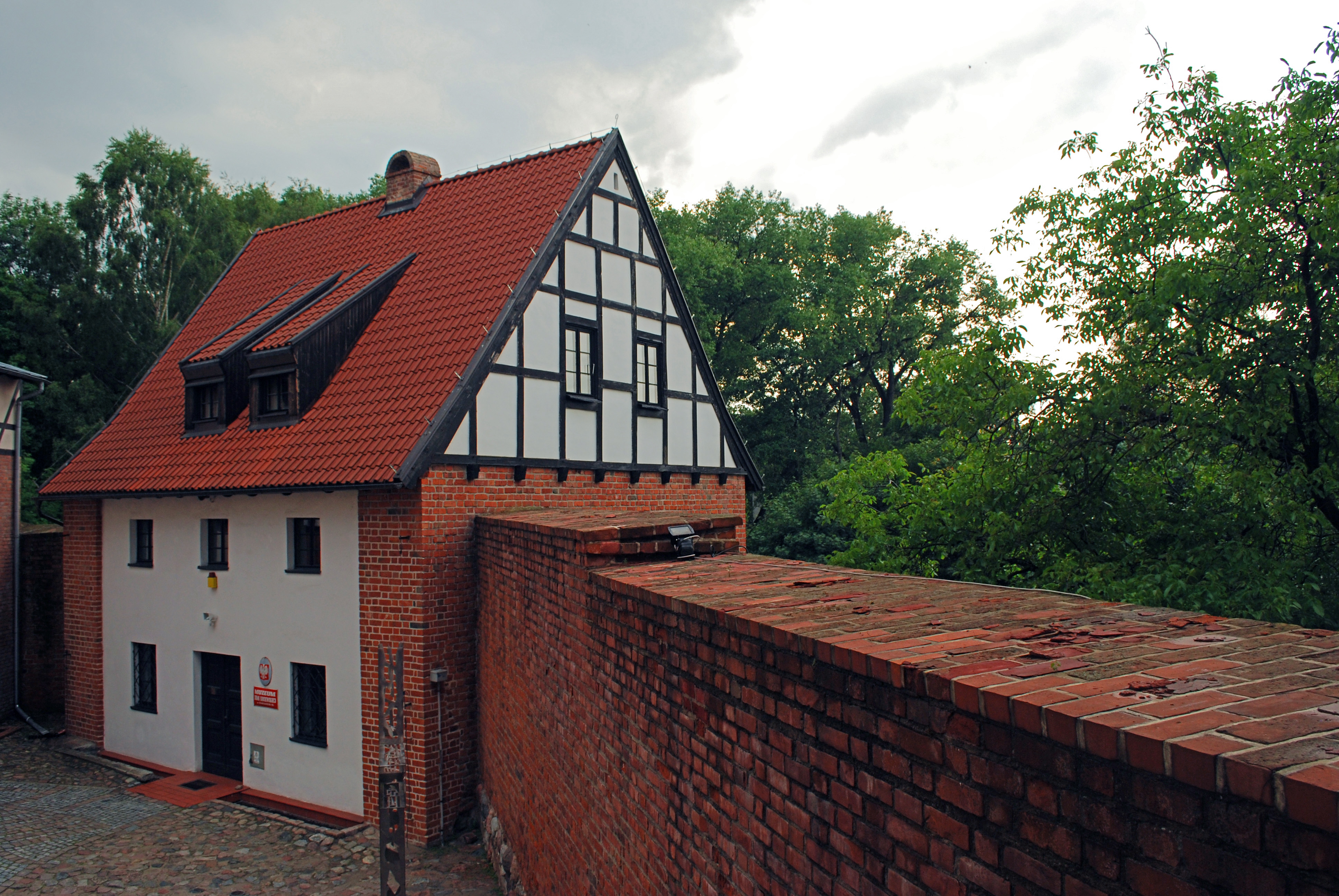
- Established: 10 September 1980
- Location: Starogard Gdański
- Director: Mariusz Brodnicki
- Website: muzeumstarogard.pl

The Museum of Kociewie Land (Polish: Muzeum Ziemi Kociewskiej) is a regional museum in Starogard Gdański, Poland. The museum has displays of the archaeology, ethnography, and history of the surrounding ethnocultural region of Kociewie.

== History ==
The idea for a museum of Kociewie and its culture evolved out of a movement in the late 1950s that worked toward protecting the identity of the ethnocultural region from cultural assimilation. A series of exhibitions throughout the following two decades became the nucleus for the foundation of a dedicated museum. The Museum of Kociewie Land was officially established on 10 September 1980 under the aegis of Zygmunt Najdowski, the then Minister of Culture and Art.

== Collections and activities ==
The museum's collections include ethnographic, historical and archaeological objects from Kociewie. The museum also hosts temporary exhibitions in the town hall building in Starogard Gdański. The museum also focuses on the contemporary culture of Kocievians such as the experience of emigration to North America and the Antipodes. In 2006 the Museum of Kociewie Land also contributed objects to a museum display of Kociewian immigration in Dunedin, New Zealand, which was first settled by ethnic Kociewians in 1874. The museum also supports events such as the folk festivals in Wycinki and Bytonia. Outcomes of the museum's research and activities have been published in the annual journal Rydwan since 2006.

== Logo ==
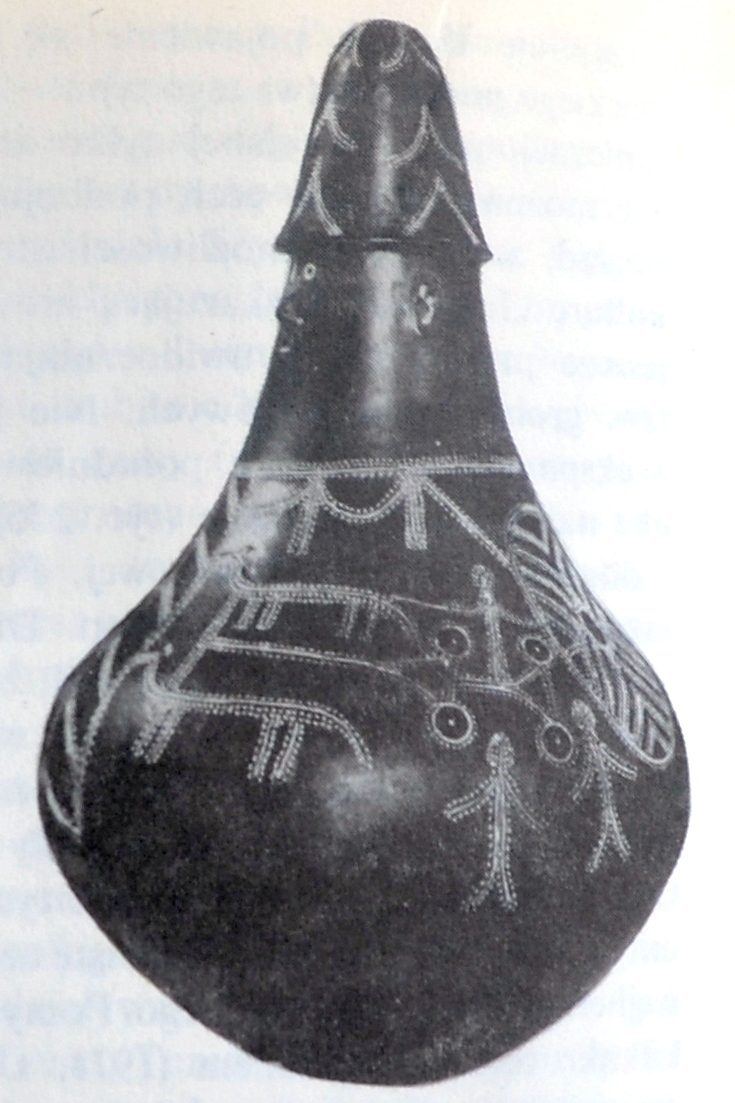
An image of the engraved vessel upon which the museum's logo is based

The museum's logo is a representation of a figure driving a horse-drawn cart, based on an engraving from a Pomeranian funerary urn that was unearthed in Grabowo in 1893.
