= Mniszek, Kuyavian-Pomeranian Voivodeship =

Village in Kociewie

Mniszek
- Village
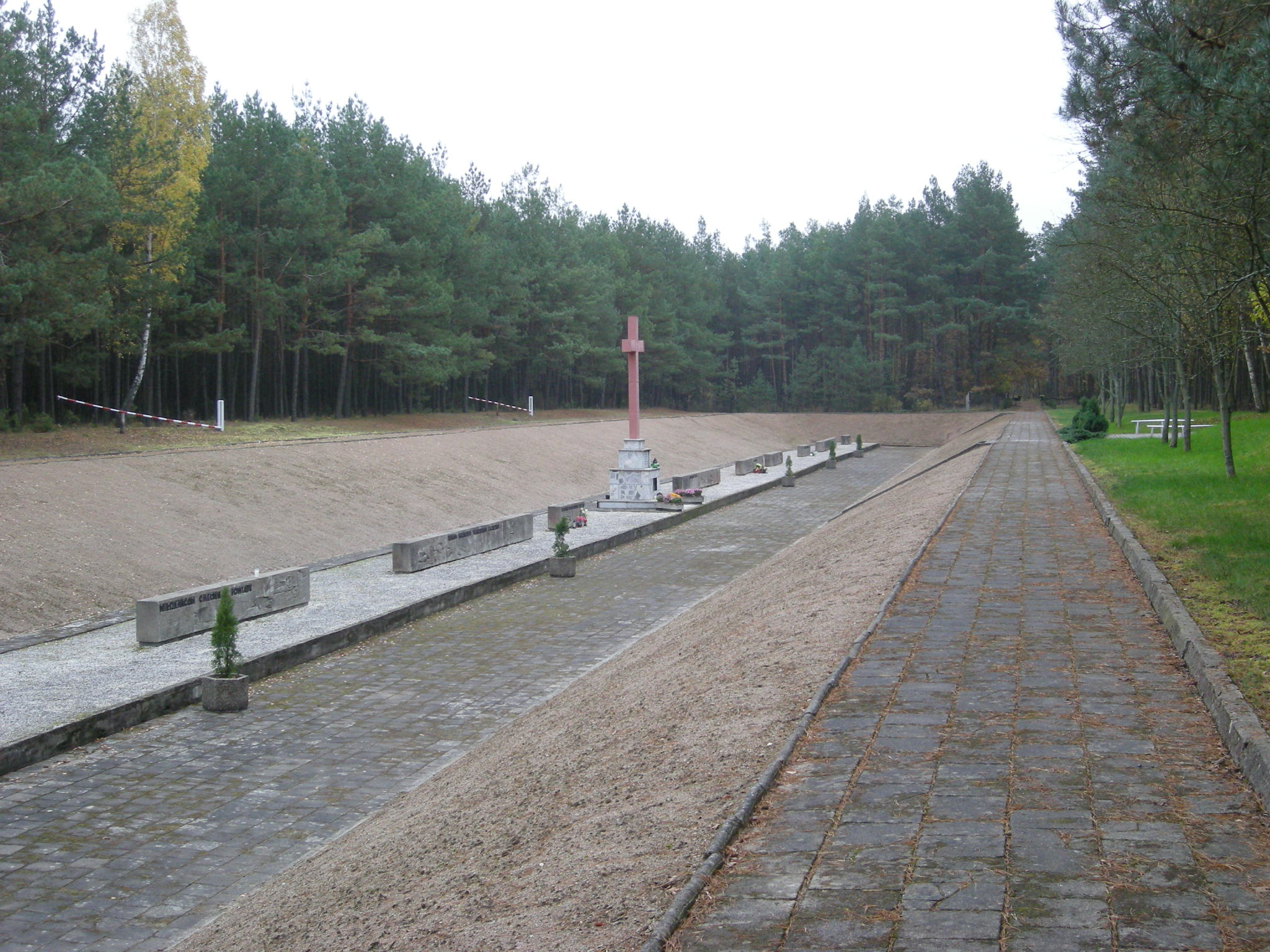
- Mass grave and memorial to 10,000 Poles murdered by Nazi Germany during World War II

- Location within Poland
- Coordinates: 53°28′N 18°37′E
- Country: Poland
- Voivodeship: Kuyavian-Pomeranian
- County: Świecie
- Gmina: Dragacz
- Time zone: UTC+1 (CET)
  - Summer (DST): UTC+2 (CEST)
- Vehicle registration: CSW

Mniszek [ˈmniʂɛk] is a village in the administrative district of Gmina Dragacz, within Świecie County, Kuyavian-Pomeranian Voivodeship, in north-central Poland. Mniszek is located within the ethnocultural region of Kociewie.

== History ==
Following the German-Soviet invasion of Poland, which started World War II in September 1939, the village was occupied by Germany until 1945. About 10,000 Polish civilians were murdered near Mniszek by the Germans. There is a memorial at the site. In 1945, the settlement was captured by the Soviets, who then looted the local factory, taking away equipment, semi-finished goods and scrap metal supplies. Afterwards, Mniszek was restored to Poland.
