= Fletnowo =

Village in Kociewie

- Village
- Location within Poland
- Coordinates: 53°33′N 18°40′E
- Country: Poland
- Voivodeship: Kuyavian-Pomeranian
- County: Świecie
- Gmina: Dragacz

Fletnowo [flɛtˈnɔvɔ] is a village in the administrative district of Gmina Dragacz, within Świecie County, Kuyavian-Pomeranian Voivodeship, in north-central Poland. Fletnowo is located within the ethnocultural region of Kociewie.
