= Gmina Dragacz =

Gmina Dragacz Dragacz Commune
- Gmina
- Coat of arms
- Interactive map of Gmina Dragacz
- Coordinates (Dragacz): 53°30′8″N 18°44′2″E
- Country: Poland
- Voivodeship: Kuyavian-Pomeranian
- County: Świecie
- Seat: Dragacz

Area
  - Total: 111.14 km^{2} (42.91 sq mi)

Population (2006)
  - Total: 6,884
  - Density: 61.94/km^{2} (160.4/sq mi)
- Website: http://www.dragacz.pl/

Gmina Dragacz is a rural gmina (administrative district) in Świecie County, Kuyavian-Pomeranian Voivodeship, in north-central Poland. Its seat is the village of Dragacz, which lies approximately 23 kilometres (14 mi) north-east of Świecie and 53 km (33 mi) north of Toruń.

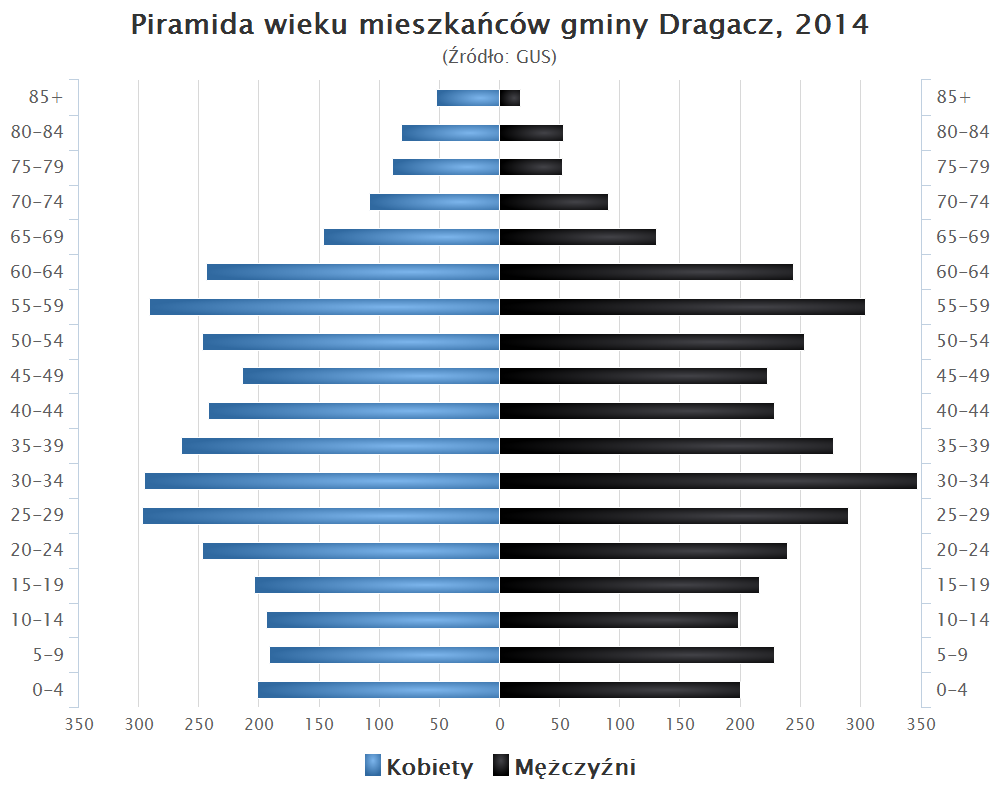

The gmina covers an area of 111.14 square kilometres (42.9 sq mi), and as of 2006 its total population is 6,884.

== Villages ==
Gmina Dragacz contains the villages and settlements of Bratwin, Dolna Grupa, Dragacz, Fletnowo, Górna Grupa, Grupa, Grupa-Osiedle, Michale, Mniszek, Nowe Marzy, Stare Marzy, Wielki Lubień, Wielkie Stwolno and Wielkie Zajączkowo.

== Neighbouring gminas ==
Gmina Dragacz is bordered by the city of Grudziądz and by the gminas of Chełmno, Grudziądz, Jeżewo, Nowe, Świecie and Warlubie.
