= Wielkie Stwolno =

Village in Kociewie

- Village
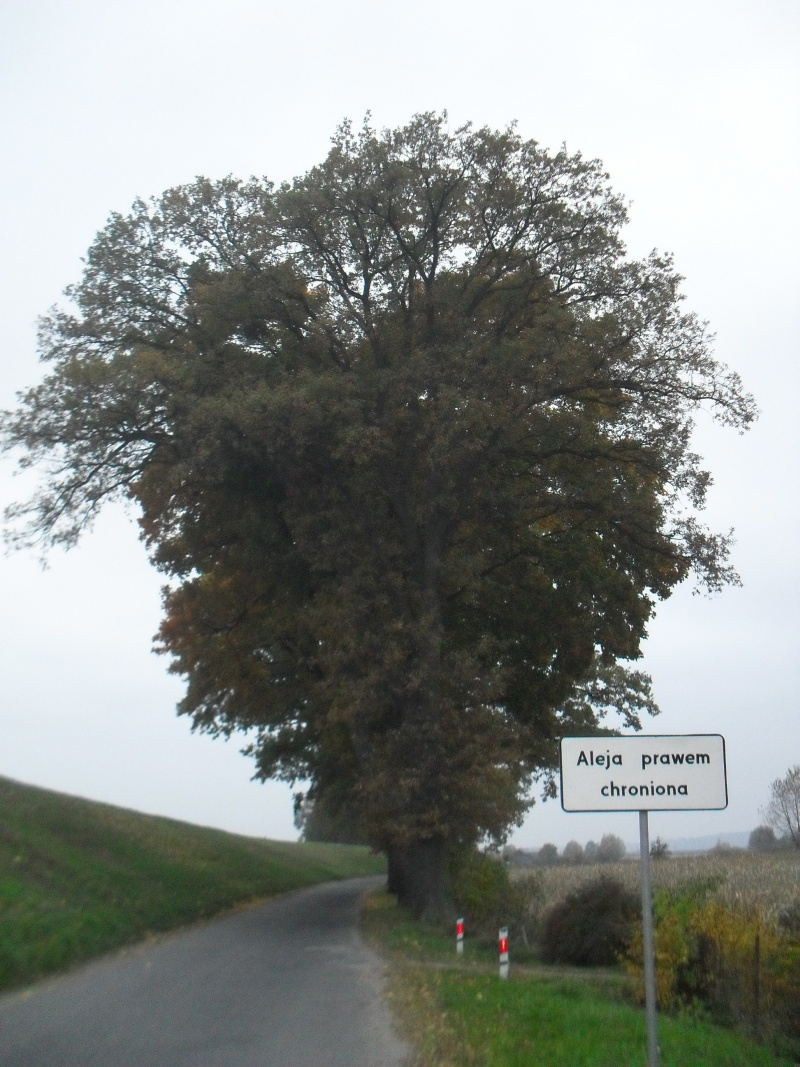
- Oak alley - a natural monument

- Location within Poland
- Coordinates: 53°26′05″N 18°37′33″E
- Country: Poland
- Voivodeship: Kuyavian-Pomeranian
- County: Świecie
- Gmina: Dragacz

Wielkie Stwolno [ˈvjɛlkʲɛ ˈstfɔlnɔ] is a village in the administrative district of Gmina Dragacz, within Świecie County, Kuyavian-Pomeranian Voivodeship, in north-central Poland. Wielkie Stwolno is located within the ethnocultural region of Kociewie.
