= Grupa, Kuyavian-Pomeranian Voivodeship =

Village in Kociewie

Grupa
- Village
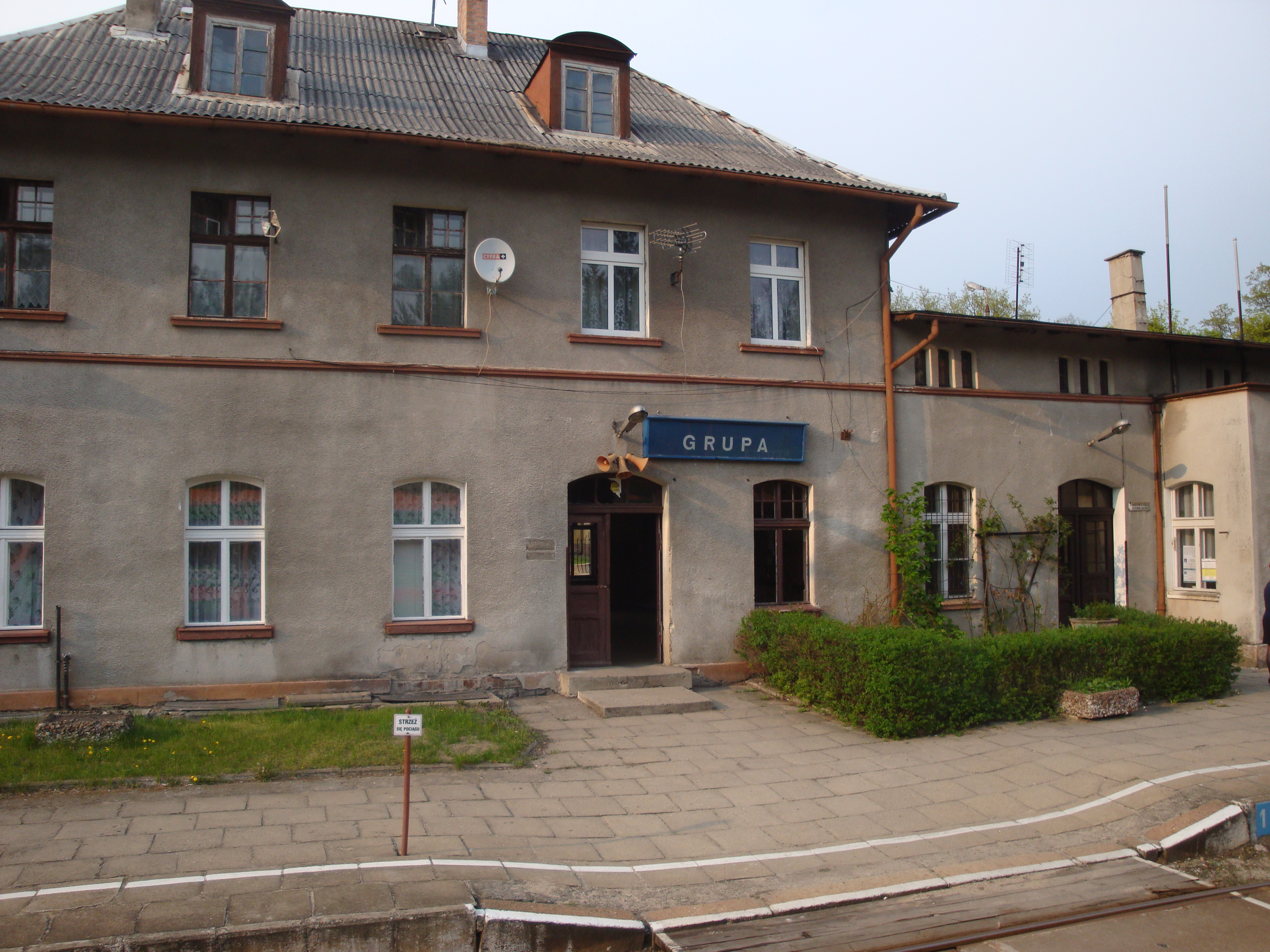
- Grupa train station

- Location within Poland
- Coordinates: 53°30′22″N 18°38′7″E
- Country: Poland
- Voivodeship: Kuyavian-Pomeranian
- County: Świecie
- Gmina: Dragacz
- Population: 541
- Time zone: UTC+1 (CET)
  - Summer (DST): UTC+2 (CEST)
- Vehicle registration: CSW

Grupa [ˈɡrupa] is a village in the administrative district of Gmina Dragacz, within Świecie County, Kuyavian-Pomeranian Voivodeship, in north-central Poland. It is located within the historic region of Pomerania.

== History ==
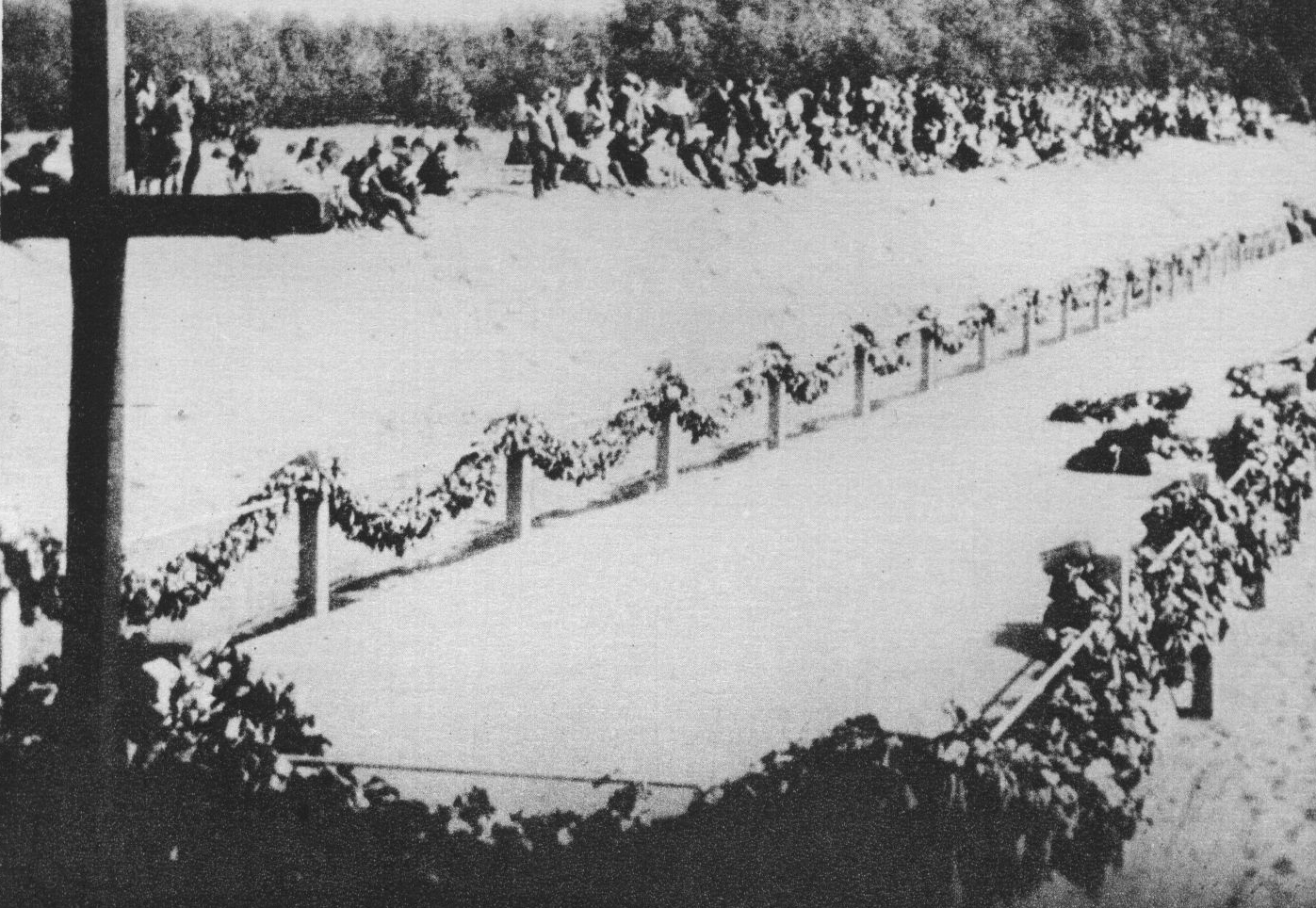
Mass grave at the place of mass executions of Poles carried out by Nazi Germany in 1939–1940

Grupa was a private village within the Polish Crown, owned by various Polish nobles, incl. the Kopycki and Żelisławski families, administratively located in the Świecie County in the Pomeranian Voivodeship.

During the German occupation of Poland (World War II), from September to December 1939, Grupa was the site of large massacres of Poles from the Świecie County, carried out by the Germans as part of the Intelligenzaktion Pommern. The Germans burned bodies of the victims in attempt to cover up the crime.
