= Grupa-Osiedle =

Village in Kociewie

- Osiedle
- Location within Poland
- Coordinates: 53°30′13″N 18°38′38″E
- Country: Poland
- Voivodeship: Kuyavian-Pomeranian
- County: Świecie
- Gmina: Dragacz
- Population: 1,646

Grupa-Osiedle [ˈɡrupa ɔˈɕɛdlɛ] is a village in the administrative district of Gmina Dragacz, within Świecie County, Kuyavian-Pomeranian Voivodeship, in north-central Poland. Grupa-Osiedle is located within the ethnocultural region of Kociewie.
