= Dragacz =

- Village
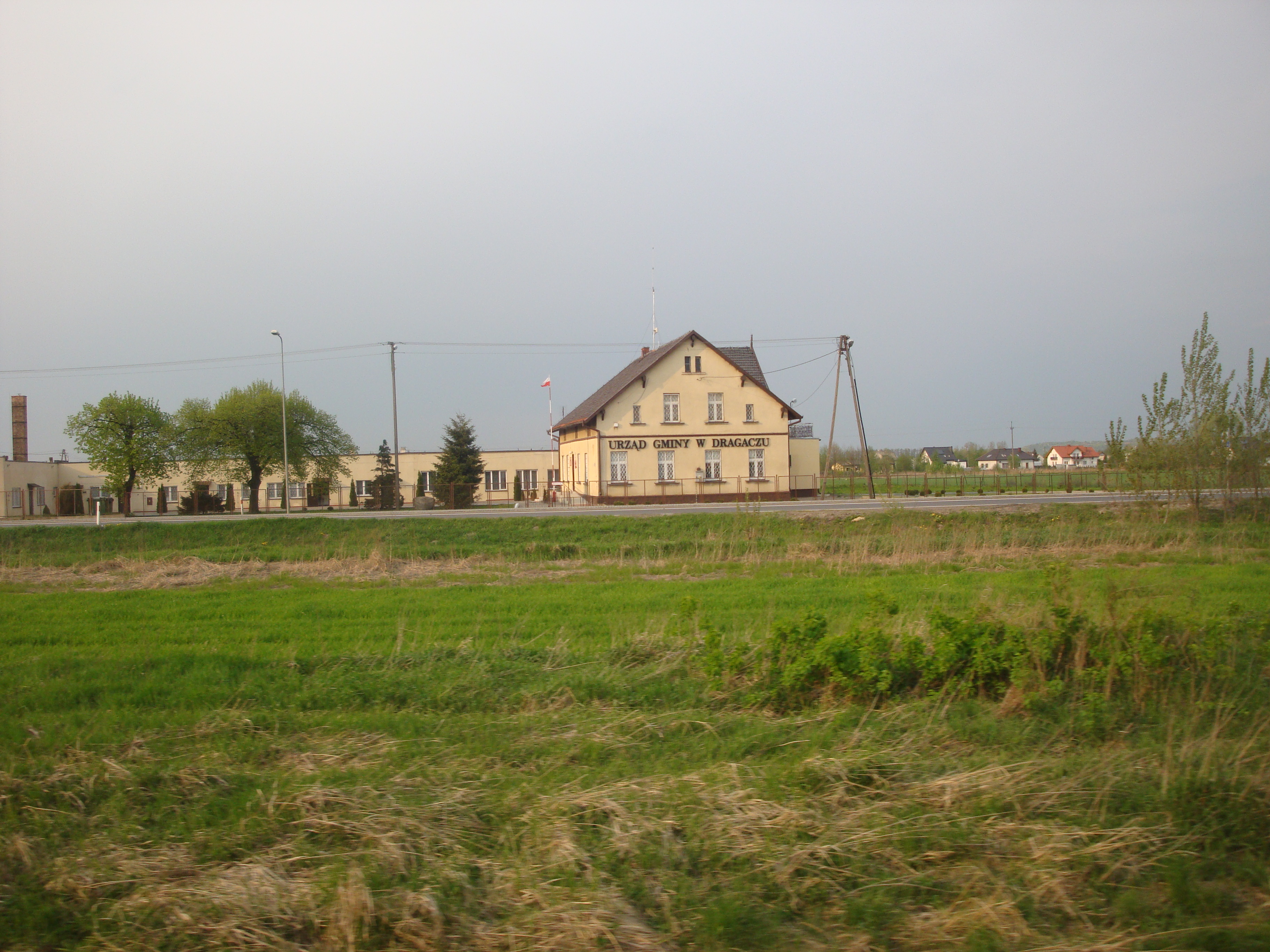
- Municipal office

- Location within Poland
- Coordinates: 53°30′8″N 18°44′2″E
- Country: Poland
- Voivodeship: Kuyavian-Pomeranian
- County: Świecie
- Gmina: Dragacz

Population
  - Total: 610

Dragacz [ˈdraɡat͡ʂ] is a village in Świecie County, Kuyavian-Pomeranian Voivodeship, in north-central Poland. It is the seat of the gmina (administrative district) called Gmina Dragacz.
