= Dolna Grupa =

Village in Kociewie

- Village
- Location within Poland
- Coordinates: 53°29′45″N 18°40′49″E
- Country: Poland
- Voivodeship: Kuyavian-Pomeranian
- County: Świecie
- Gmina: Dragacz
- Population: 1,030

Dolna Grupa (Polish pronunciation: [ˈdɔlna ˈɡrupa]) is a village in the administrative district of Gmina Dragacz, within Świecie County, Kuyavian-Pomeranian Voivodeship, in north-central Poland. The village is located within the ethnocultural region of Kociewie.
