= Starogard Gdański =

City in Poland

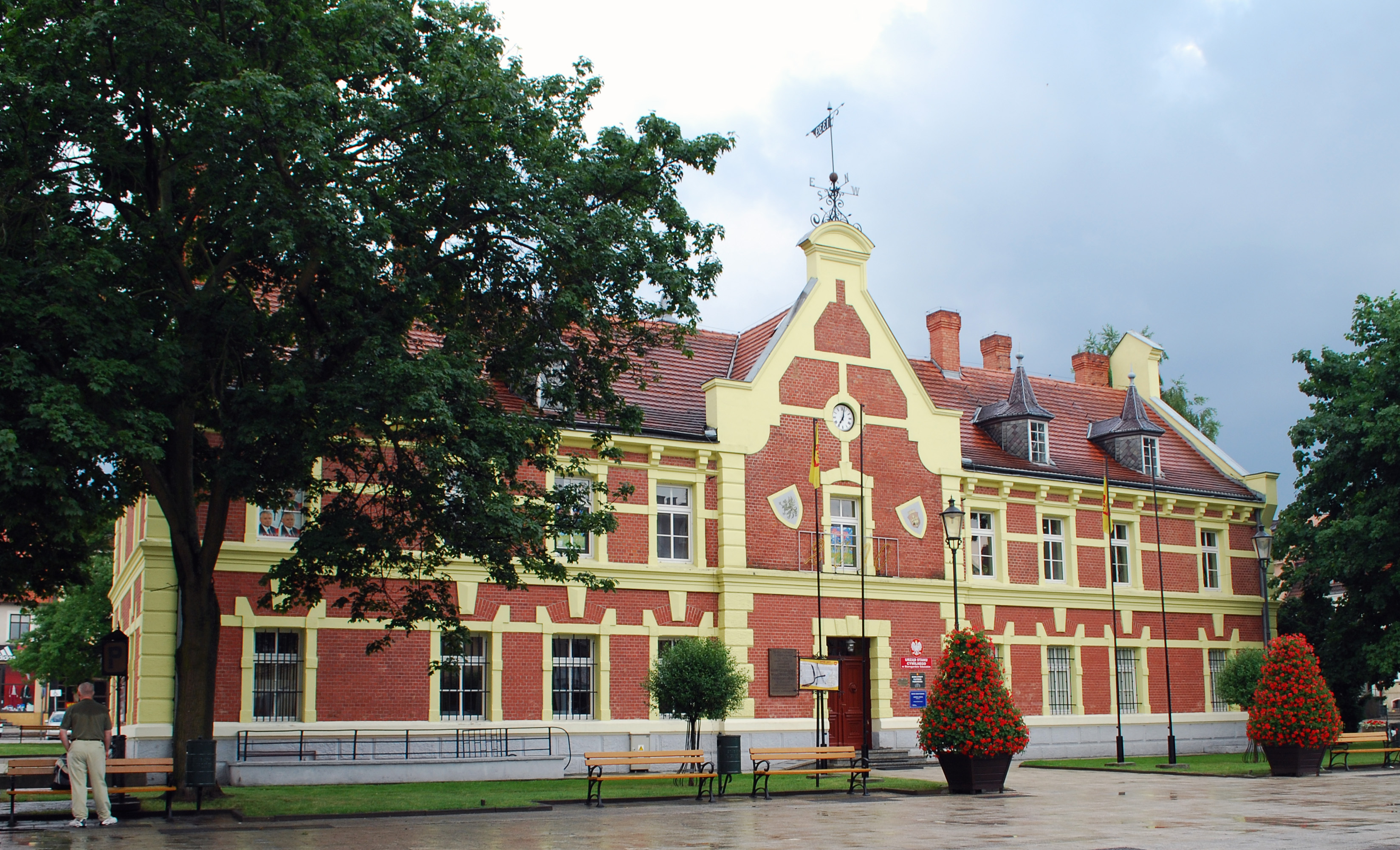
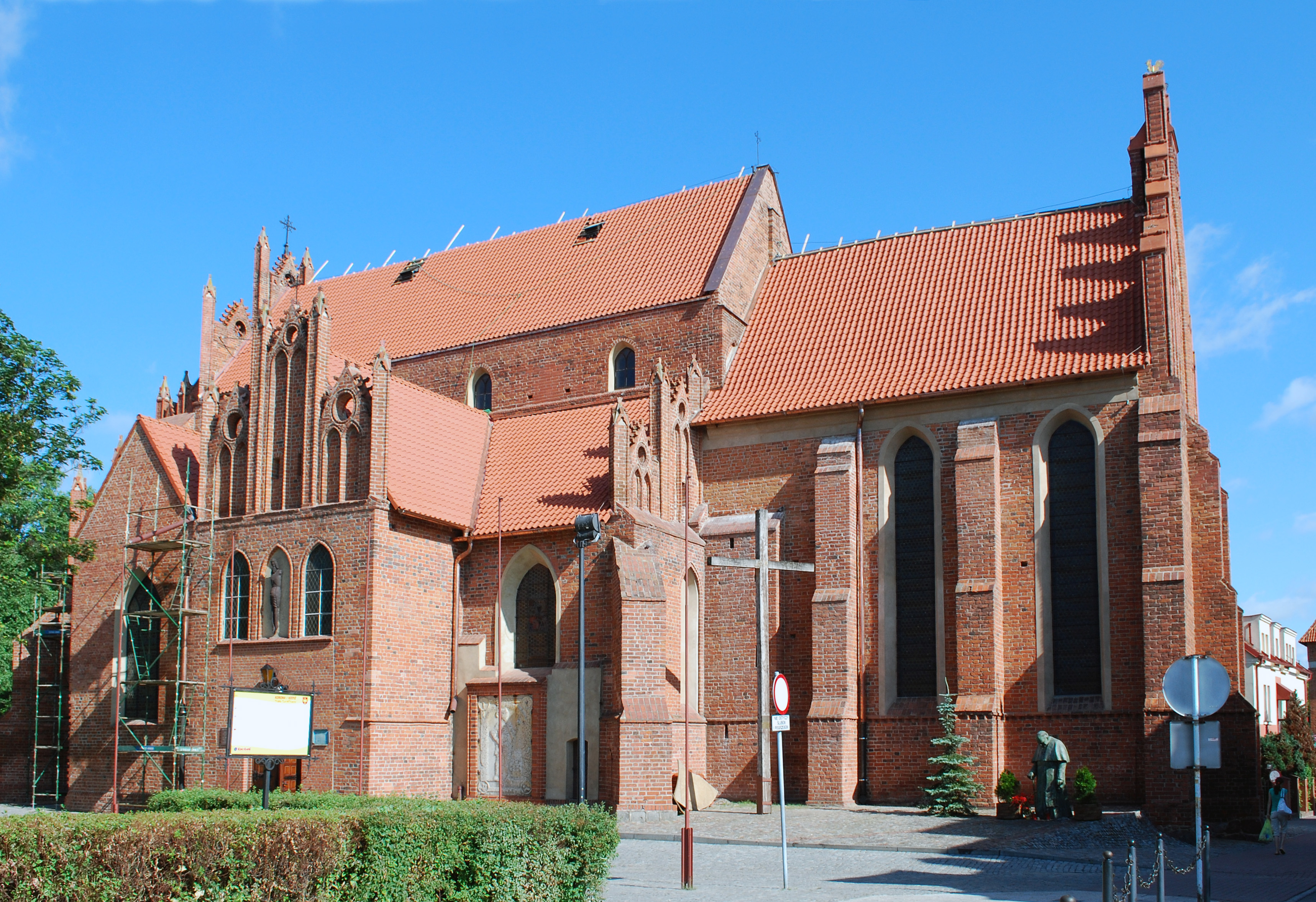
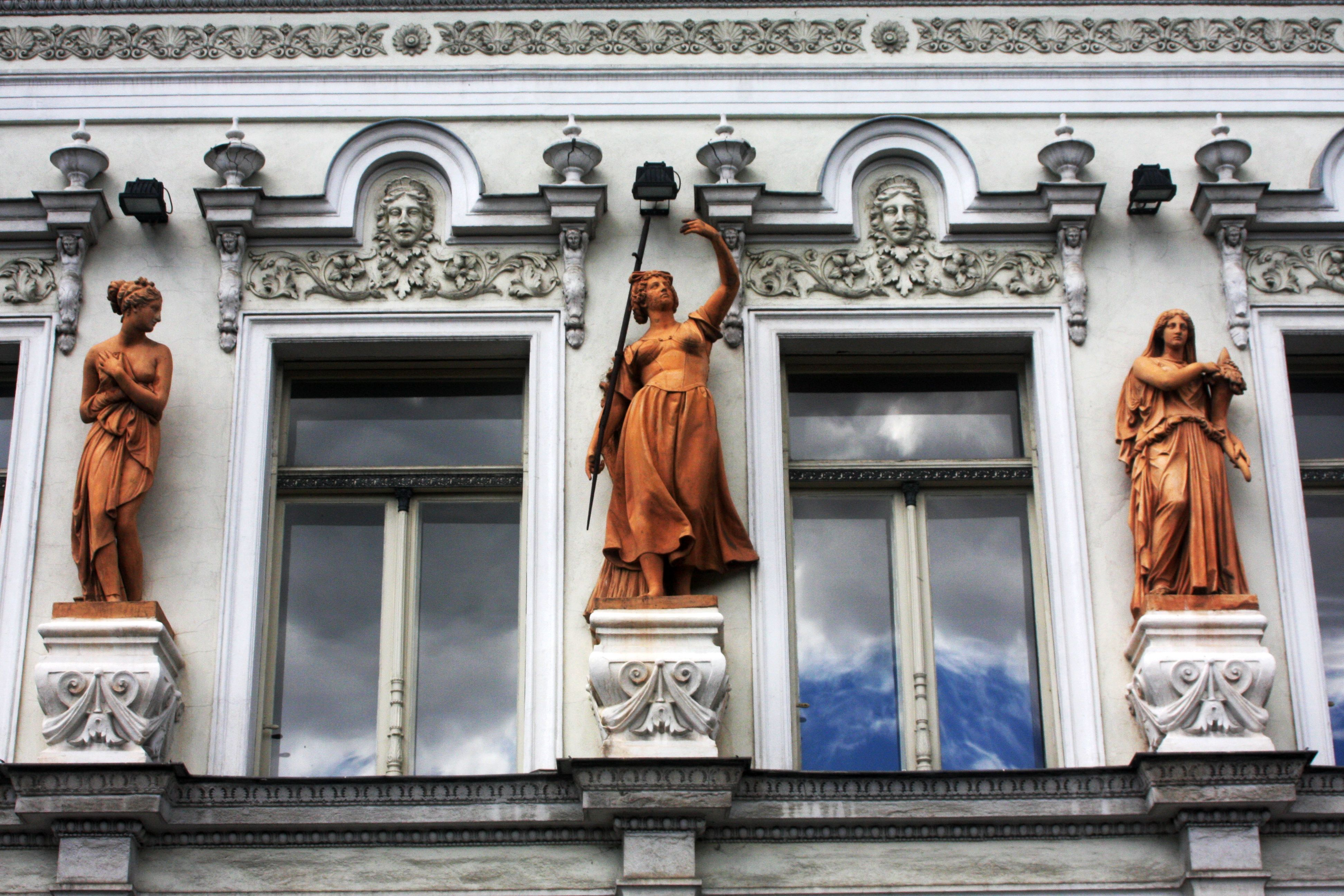
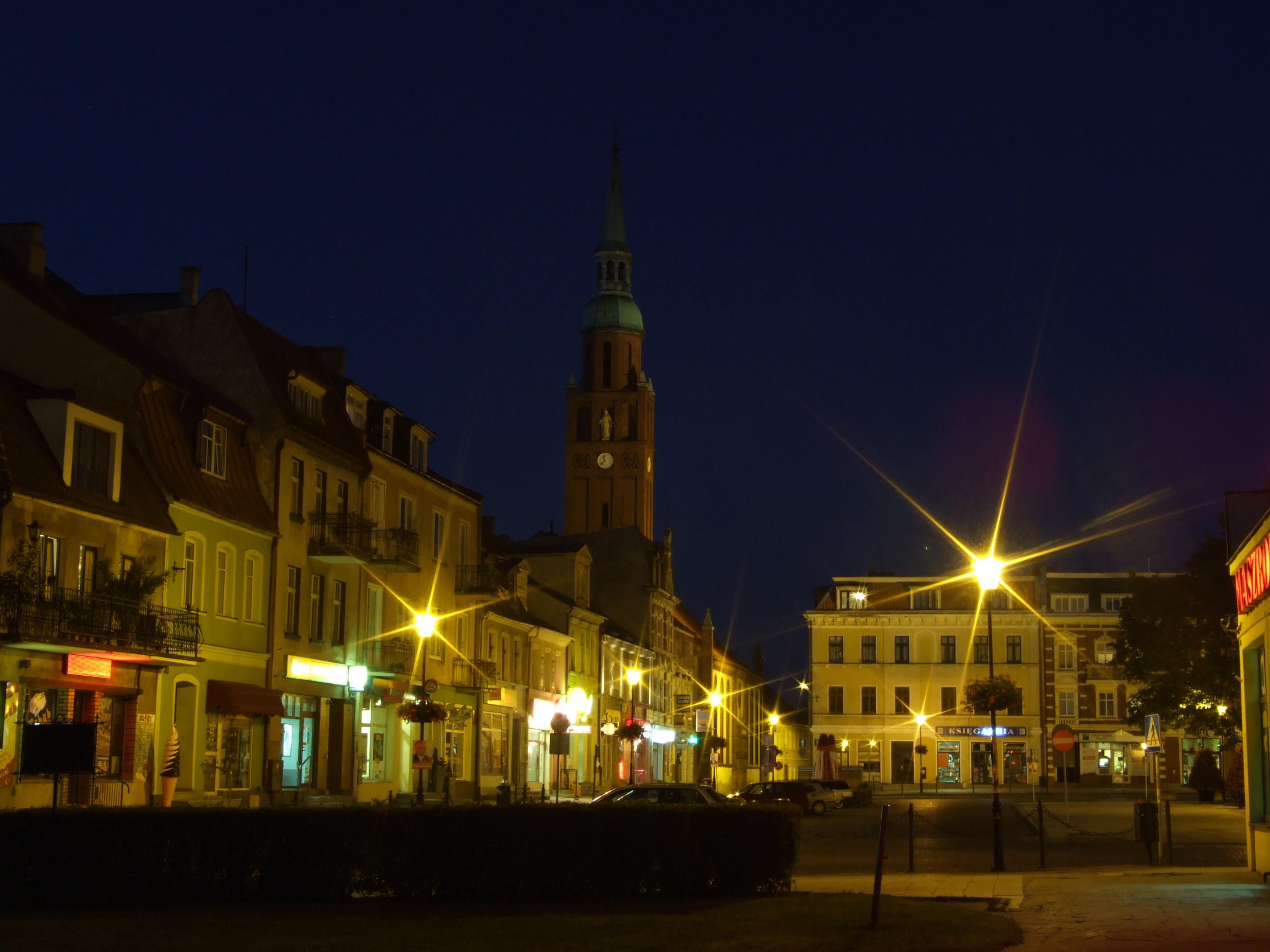
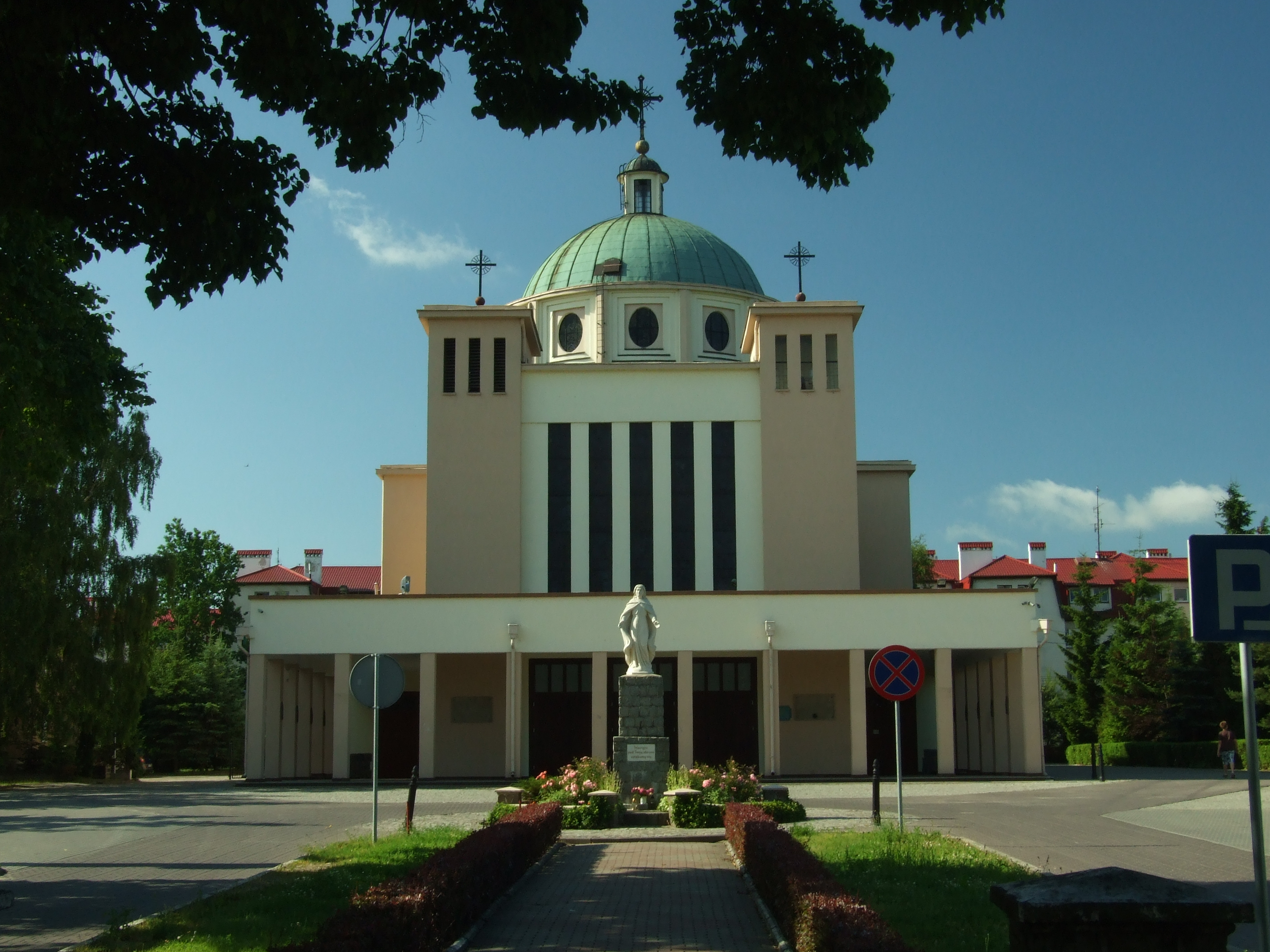
- City Hall Saint Matthew church Wiechert Palace Market Square Saint Adalbert church

- Flag Coat of arms

- Location within Poland
- Coordinates: 53°58′N 18°32′E
- Country: Poland
- Voivodeship: Pomeranian
- County: Starogard
- Gmina: Starogard Gdański (urban gmina)
- Established: 1198
- City rights: 1348

Government
  - City mayor: Janusz Stankowiak

Area
  - Total: 25.27 km^{2} (9.76 sq mi)

Population (2020)
  - Total: 47,272
  - Density: 1,871/km^{2} (4,845/sq mi)
- Time zone: UTC+1 (CET)
  - Summer (DST): UTC+2 (CEST)
- Postal code: 83-200
- Area code: +48 58
- Car plates: GST
- Website: starogard.pl

Starogard Gdański (Polish pronunciation: [staˈrɔɡard ˈɡdaj̃skʲi]; until 1950: Starogard; formerly German: Preußisch Stargard) is a city in Pomeranian Voivodeship in northern Poland with 48,328 inhabitants (2004). Starogard is the capital of Starogard County.

Founded in the Middle Ages, Starogard is a city with various heritage sights including medieval defensive walls and towers. It was the location of the sejmik (local parliament) of the Pomeranian Voivodeship in the early modern period. In the late modern period, it was an important center of Polish resistance against the Germanisation policies of Prussia following the Partitions of Poland. Starogard is home to one of the oldest vodka factories in Poland, one of the largest and oldest psychiatric hospitals in Poland and notable basketball club SKS Starogard Gdański. Starogard is the second biggest city of the ethnocultural region of Kociewie (after Tczew). It is considered the capital of Kociewie, and as such it hosts the Museum of Kociewie Land, devoted to the history of the region.

== Geographical location ==
Starogard Gdański is located in Pomerania on the small river Wierzyca, about 21 kilometres (13 miles) south-west of Tczew, 40 km (25 mi) south of Gdańsk and 67 km (42 mi) north-east of Chojnice. It is 50 km (31 mi) from the Tricity (Polish: Trójmiasto) agglomeration on the coast of Gdańsk Bay.

== Etymology ==
The name Starogard means 'old city' in the Pomeranian language. In the 20th century, 'Gdański' was appended to the name of the town, in reference to its then voivodeship of Gdańsk, in order to differentiate it from the Pomeranian town of Stargard. The German name Preußisch Stargard (lit. 'Prussian Stargard') had been similarly used to disambiguate the town from other places named Stargard.

== History ==
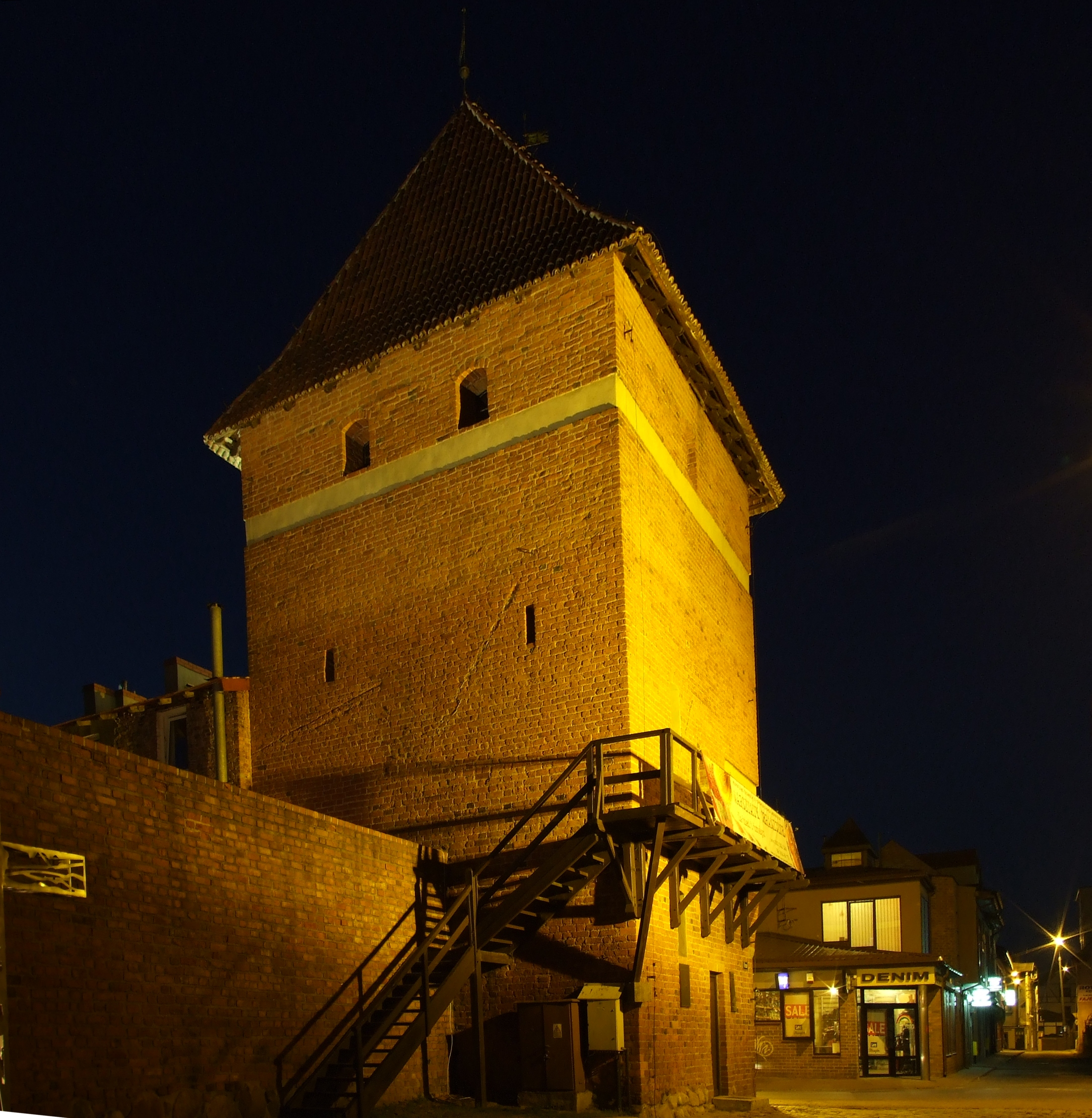
Medieval Gdańsk Tower (Baszta Gdańska)

Archaeological evidence indicates remnants of a Neolithic settlement from four to five thousand years ago.

The area became part of the emerging Polish state under its first ruler Mieszko I of Poland in the 10th century, and during the fragmentation period in Poland it was part of a Pomeranian duchy, which separated from Poland in 1227. Starogrod (as Starigrod) was first mentioned in 1198 when Duke Grzymisław II of Pomerania granted the settlement to the Knights Hospitaller. The Slavic name Stargarde was mentioned in 1269. In 1282, Mestwin II and Polish Duke Przemysł II signed the Treaty of Kępno, which transferred the suzerainty over Gdańsk Pomerania including Starogard to Przemysł II and reunited the region with Poland. Together with the rest of Gdańsk Pomerania it came under the rule of the Teutonic Knights during the 1308 Teutonic takeover of Gdańsk. In 1348 the town received city rights under Kulm Law by Grandmaster Heinrich Dusemer.

Since 31 March 1440 Starogard was a member of the Prussian Confederation. It took an active part in the 1454 uprising against the Teutonic Order that led to the Thirteen Years' War (1454–66). In 1454, Polish King Casimir IV Jagiellon re-incorporated the region to the Kingdom of Poland upon the request of the Confederation, and the city recognized the King as the rightful ruler. In 1461 the Teutonic Knights took over Starogard, which was then eventually recaptured by Poland in July 1466. In the peace treaty signed in Toruń a few months later in 1466, the Teutonic Knights renounced any claims to the city, and recognized it as part of Poland. It was a royal city of Poland, administratively located in the Pomeranian Voivodeship in the province of Royal Prussia in the larger Greater Poland Province. It remained under Polish rule until the First Partition of Poland in 1772, when it became part of the Kingdom of Prussia under the name Preußisch Stargard. The city was subjected to Germanisation policies. One of the main escape routes for insurgents of the unsuccessful Polish November Uprising from partitioned Poland to the Great Emigration led through the city.

In 1871, a large vodka distillery was built on the western end of city, which survived both world wars and today produces Sobieski and Krupnik. It is one of Europe's oldest continuously run vodka distilleries, and one of only a very small handful of vodka distilleries predating 1945. In 1871, with the Prussian-led unification of Germany, Preußisch Stargard became part of the German Empire. In the same year, it was connected to the rail network and in 1900 a water and gas network was built in the city. At the beginning of the 20th century, the city had a Protestant church, a Catholic church, a synagogue, a grammar school, a preparatory institute, a district court, a Reichsbank branch, a main tax office and a number of commercial operations. According to the census of 1905, the town had a population of 10,485, of which 6,297 (60.1%) were Germans. In 1906–1907, local Polish children joined the children school strikes against Germanisation that spread throughout the Prussian Partition of Poland.

Until 1920, the city belonged to the Preußisch Stargard district in Regierungsbezirk Danzig in the Province of West Prussia in Germany. After World War I, it was reincorporated into Poland, which had just regained independence as the Second Polish Republic. In the interbellum it was a county seat administratively located in the Pomeranian Voivodeship of Poland.

=== World War II ===
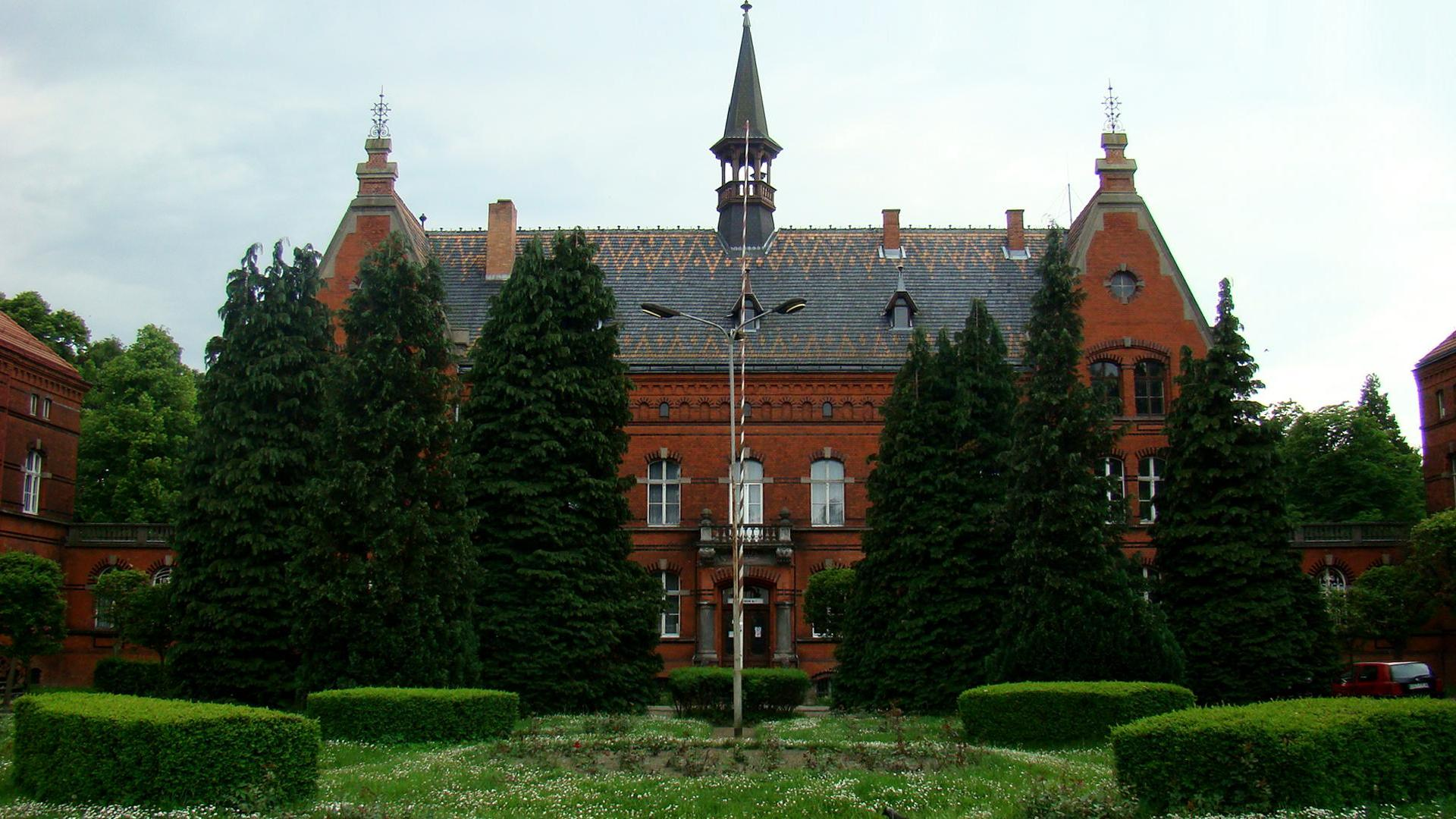
Psychiatric hospital in the Kocborowo district

During the joint German-Soviet invasion of Poland, which started World War II in September 1939, the city was invaded by Nazi Germany, and then the German Einsatzkommando 16 and SS Wachsturmbann "Eimann" entered the city to commit various crimes against Poles. Under German occupation, the city was annexed into the newly formed Regierungsbezirk Danzig in the new province of Reichsgau Danzig-West Prussia. The Polish population was subjected to mass arrests, imprisonment, tortures, massacres, expulsions, deportations to concentration camps and to forced labour.

The Germans immediately carried out mass arrests of Polish teachers, priests and local activists in the town and county as part of the Intelligenzaktion. Arrested Poles were then held both in the pre-war prison and the medieval Gdańsk Tower and often subjected to brutal beatings and mistreatment, especially clergymen, some of whom had even swastikas cut into their foreheads. Already in September 1939, the Germans murdered 150 Poles, including inhabitants of Starogard, Skórcz and Gdynia, in the city and its vicinity.

Beginning in September 1939 in nearby Szpęgawski Forest (north-east of the city) Germans killed in mass executions about 7,000 Poles, among them 1,680 Kocborowo (district of Starogard) and Świecie psychiatric hospitals patients. About 500 handicapped children were killed in the hospital, in Action T4. 2,842 patients died between 1940 and 1944. Polish hospital staff was either murdered in the Szpęgawski Forest or deported to concentration camps or to forced labour to Germany. A local parish priest was murdered in a massacre of around 230 Poles in Płutowo. The Germans also established and operated a subcamp of the Stutthof concentration camp in the town.

Despite such circumstances, Poles still organized an underground resistance movement, including the Home Army and Jaszczurka organizations.

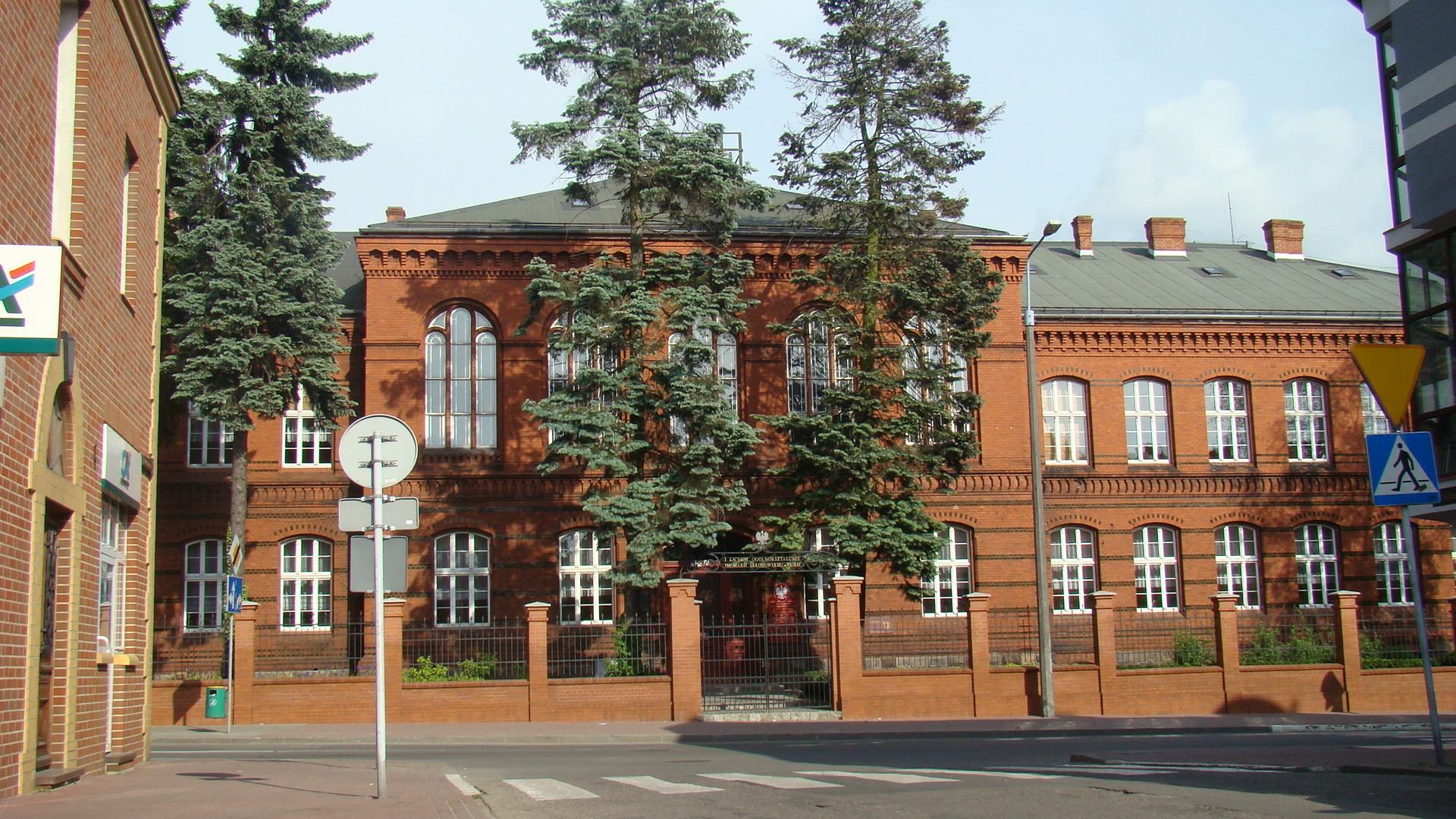
I Liceum Ogólnokształcące im. Marii Skłodowskiej-Curie, high school, in which the Polish youth anti-communist organization Jord-Just operated in 1951–1952.

In 1945 the German occupation ended and the town was restored to Poland, however with a Soviet-installed communist regime, which remained in power until the Fall of Communism in the 1980s.

=== Contemporary history ===
The Jord-Just youth anti-communist resistance organization was established in Starogard in 1951 by 16-year-old girl Teresa Block. The organization was eventually crushed by the communists, who sentenced 17 teenage members to 1.5 to 9 years in prison.

== Number of inhabitants by year ==
Sights of Starogard Gdański (examples)

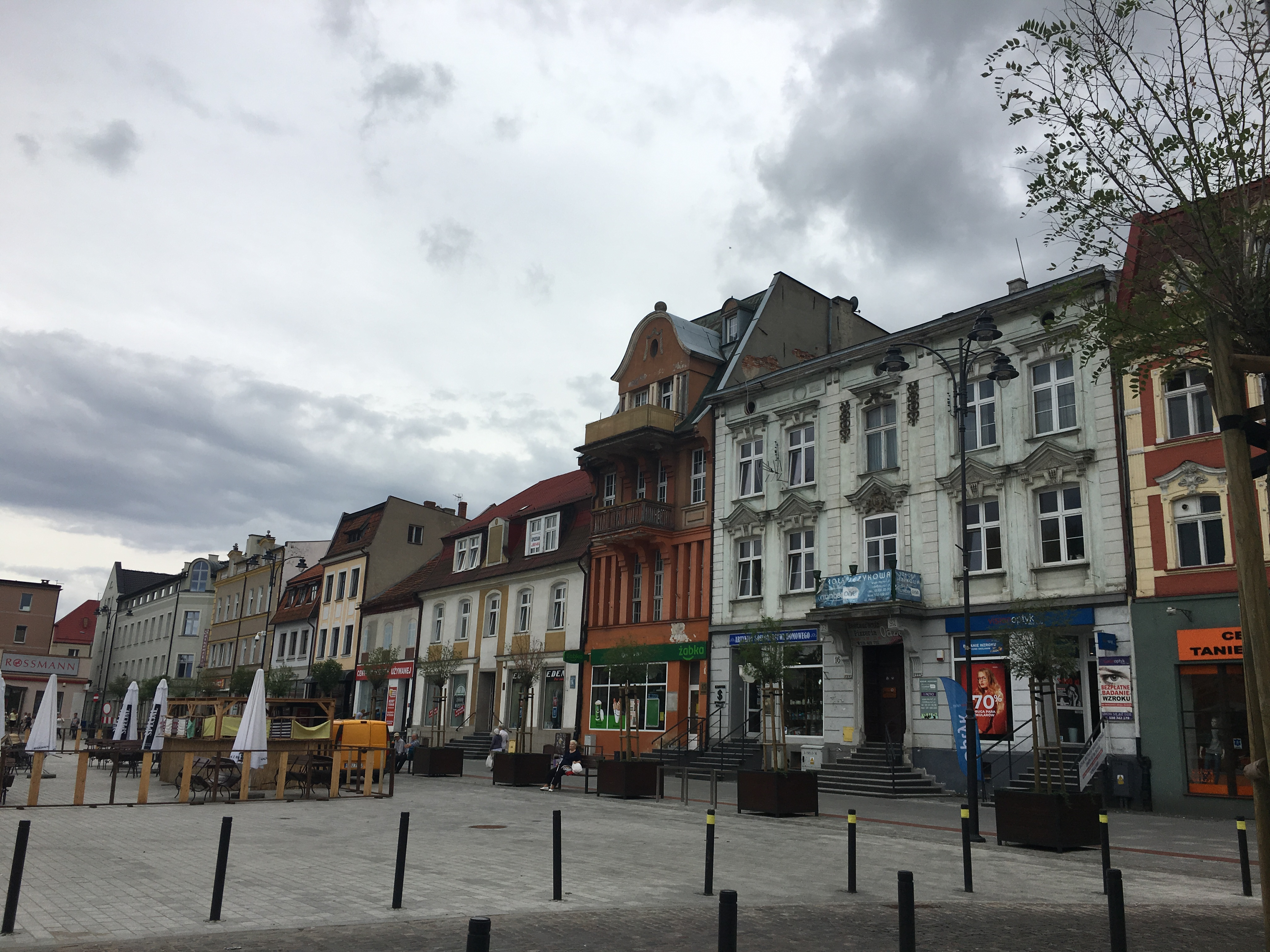
Rynek (Market Square) filled with historic houses

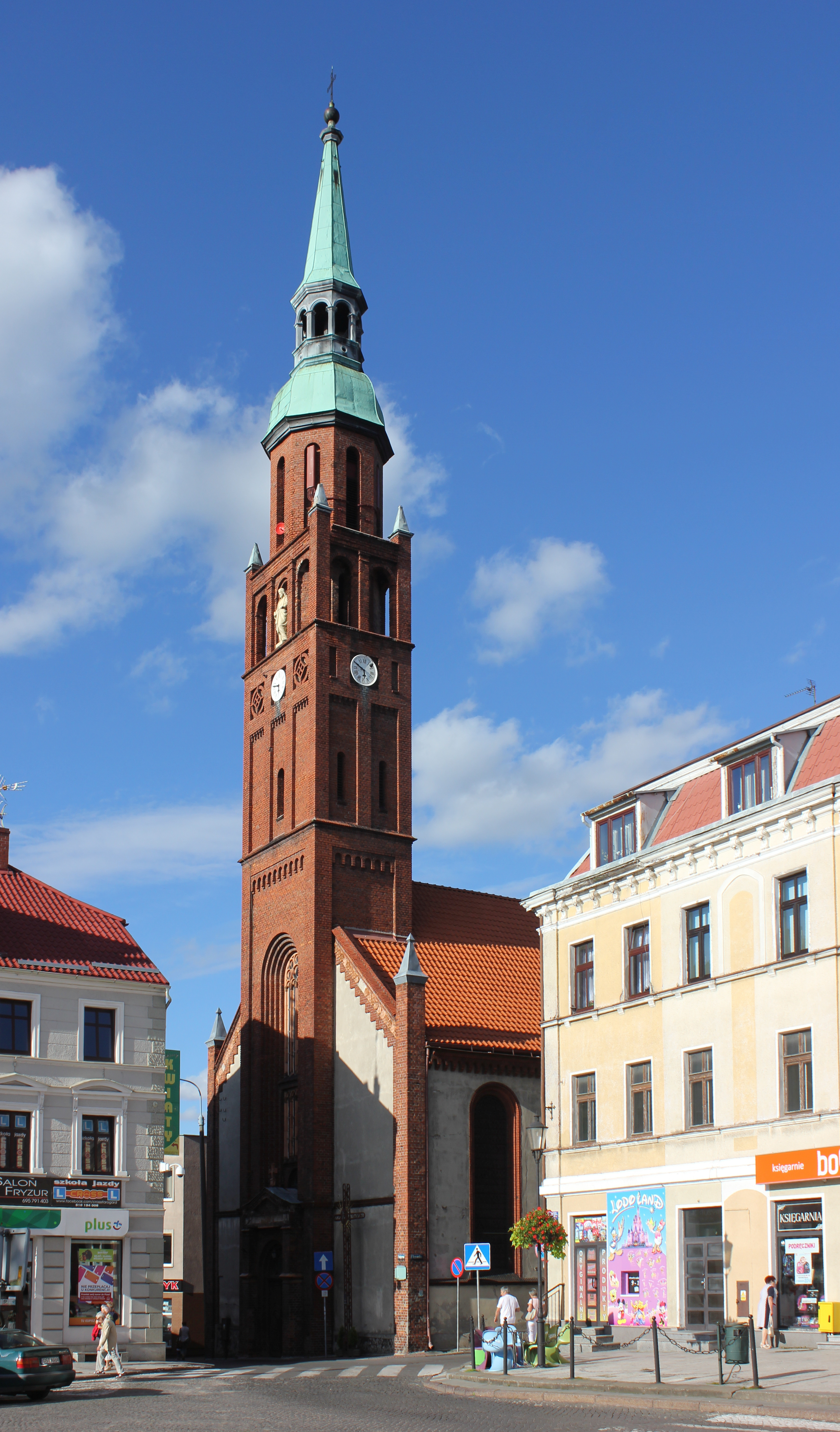
Saint Catherine church

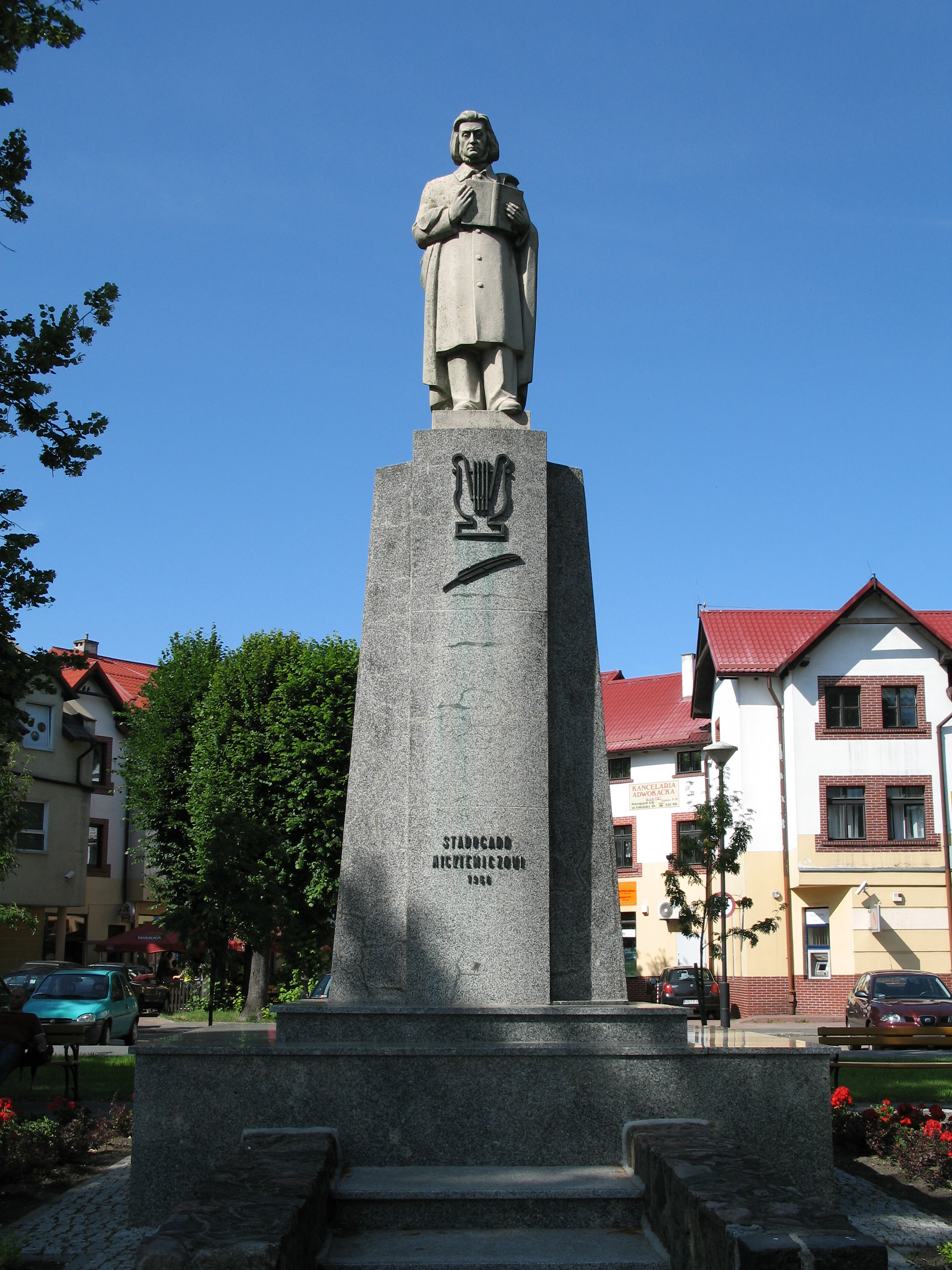
Adam Mickiewicz monument

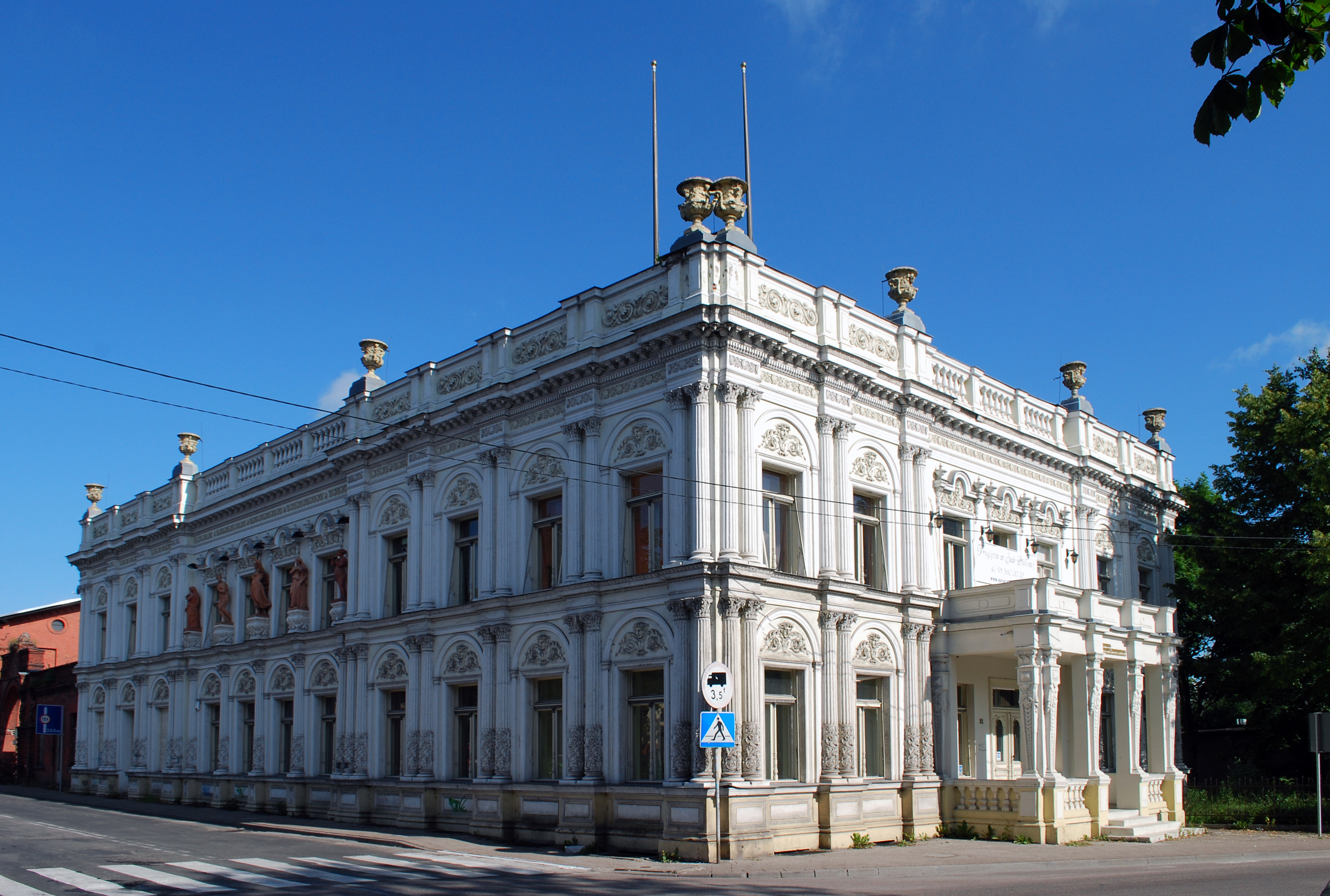
Wiechert Palace

Historical population

Year	Pop.	±%
1772	1,103	—
1782	1,410	+27.8%
1831	3,145	+123.0%
1875	6,022	+91.5%
1880	6,253	+3.8%
1890	7,080	+13.2%
1905	10,485	+48.1%
1921	13,360	+27.4%

Year	Pop.	±%
1943	17,895	+33.9%
1960	25,800	+44.2%
1970	33,700	+30.6%
1980	44,200	+31.2%
1990	49,500	+12.0%
2001	49,884	+0.8%
2012	49,072	−1.6%
2020	47,272	−3.7%

Source: Note that the above table is based on primary, possibly biased, sources.

== Culture ==
The Museum of Kociewie Land (Muzeum Ziemi Kociewskiej), the main museum devoted to the history of Kociewie, is located in Starogard Gdański. It contains archaeological, ethnographic and historical collections.

== Major corporations ==
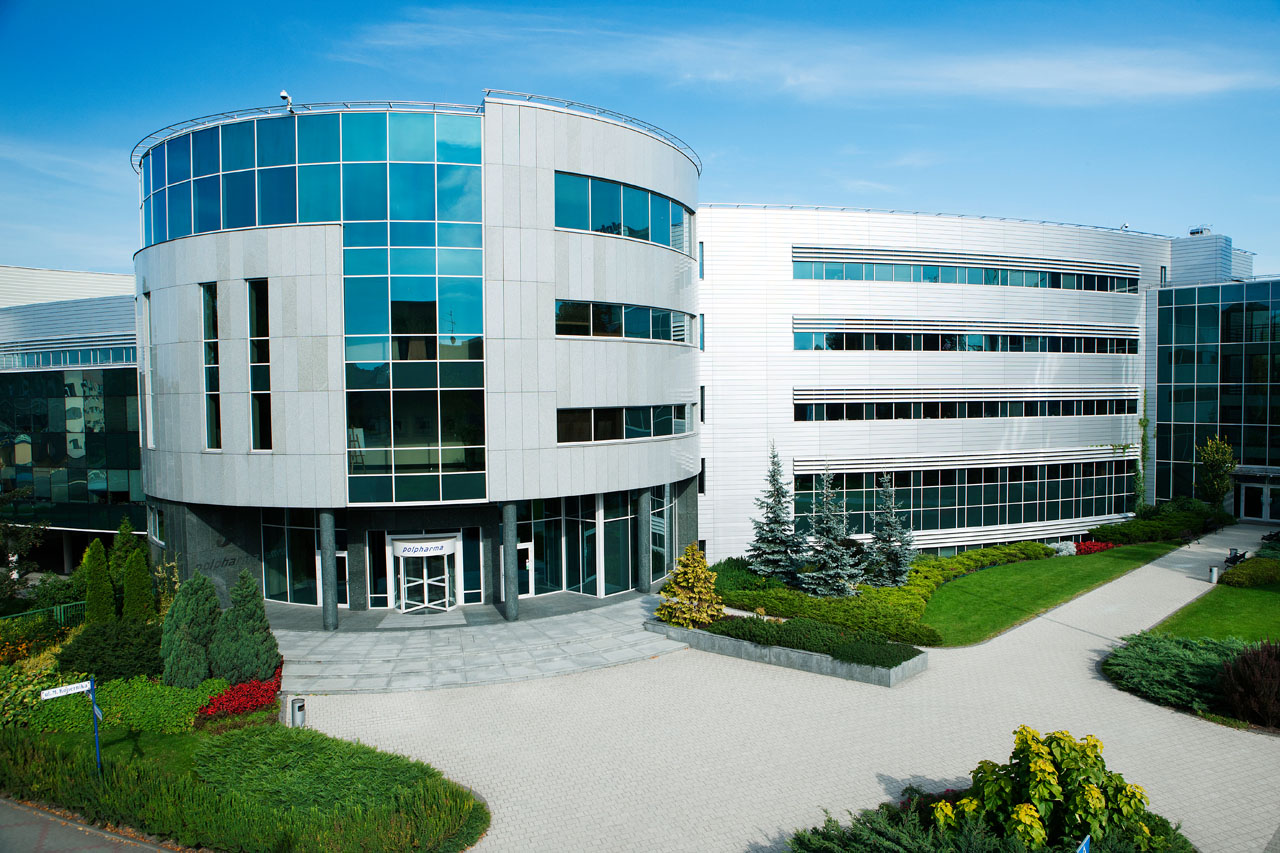
The Polpharma pharmaceuticals production site

- Polpharma
- Destylarnia Sobieski SA, which distils the Sobieski brand

== Transport ==
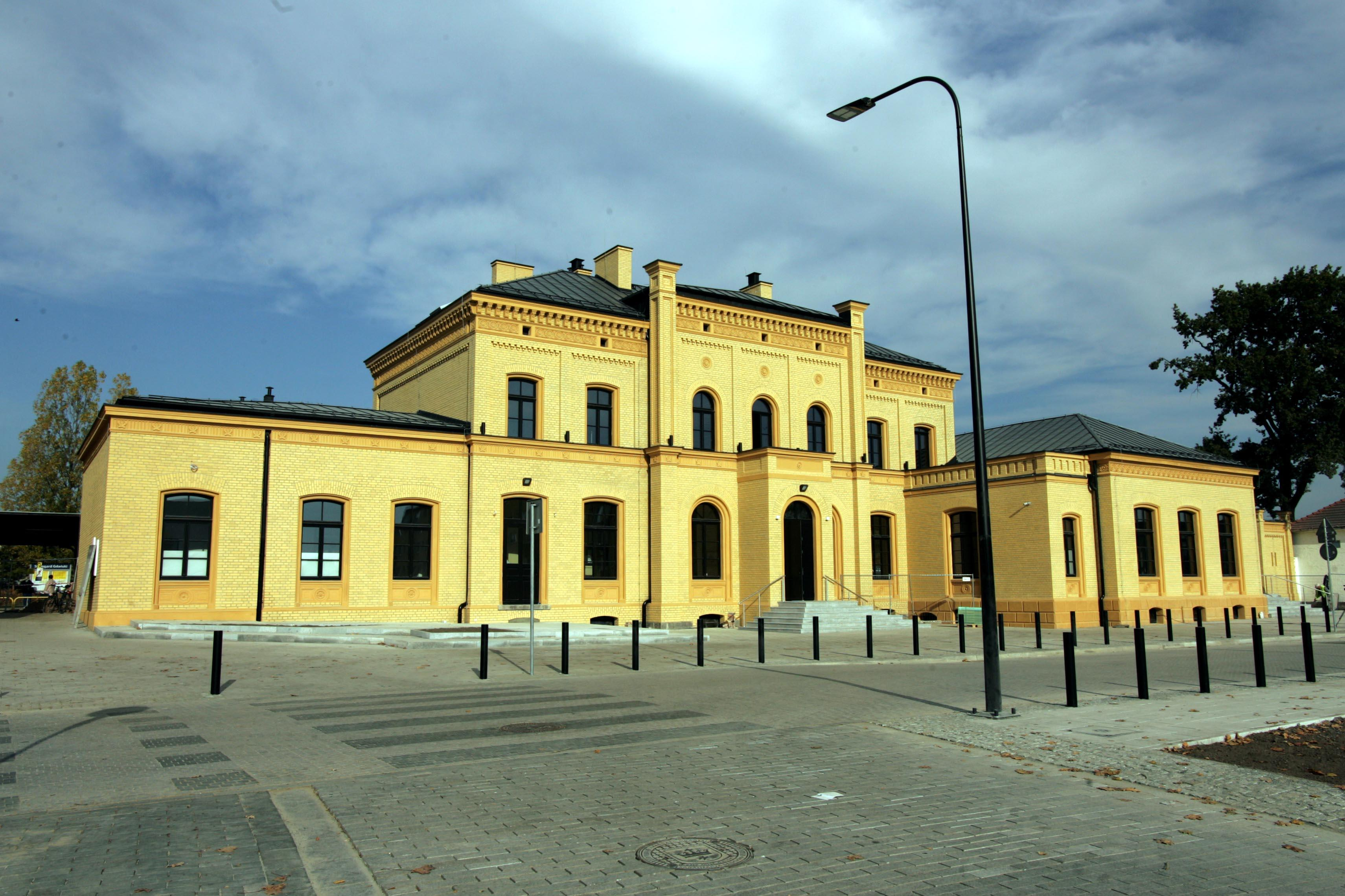
Main train station

The Polish National road 22 and Voivodeship road 222 pass through the city, and the A1 motorway runs nearby, east of the city. There is a train station in Starogard.

== Education ==
- Pomorska Szkoła Wyższa w Starogardzie Gdańskim
- I Liceum Ogólnokształcące w Starogardzie Gdańskim

== Sports ==
The town's most notable sports club is basketball team SKS Starogard Gdański, which plays in the Polish Basketball League (Poland's top division), Polish Cup winners in 2011, and runners-up in 2006. The local football club is KP Starogard Gdański, and it competes in the III liga (Polish fourth tier). The team plays in green and white at the Stadion Miejski.

The town was home to the Polish World Cup football player and Olympic Gold Medal winner Kazimierz Deyna. Deyna grew up in Starogard Gdański, and the local Stadion Miejski im. Kazimierza Deyny is named after him. There is also a statue to him in the seating area of the ground, and a heritage trail through the town which takes in his birthplace, family home and murals to the sportsman. Starogard Gdański also boasted Olympic bronze medal winner Oktawia Nowacka. Michael Hicks, an Olympian that represents Poland in 3x3 Basketball at the 2020 Olympic Games, currently resides in Starogard Gdański and holds basketball camps for the youth.

== Notable people ==
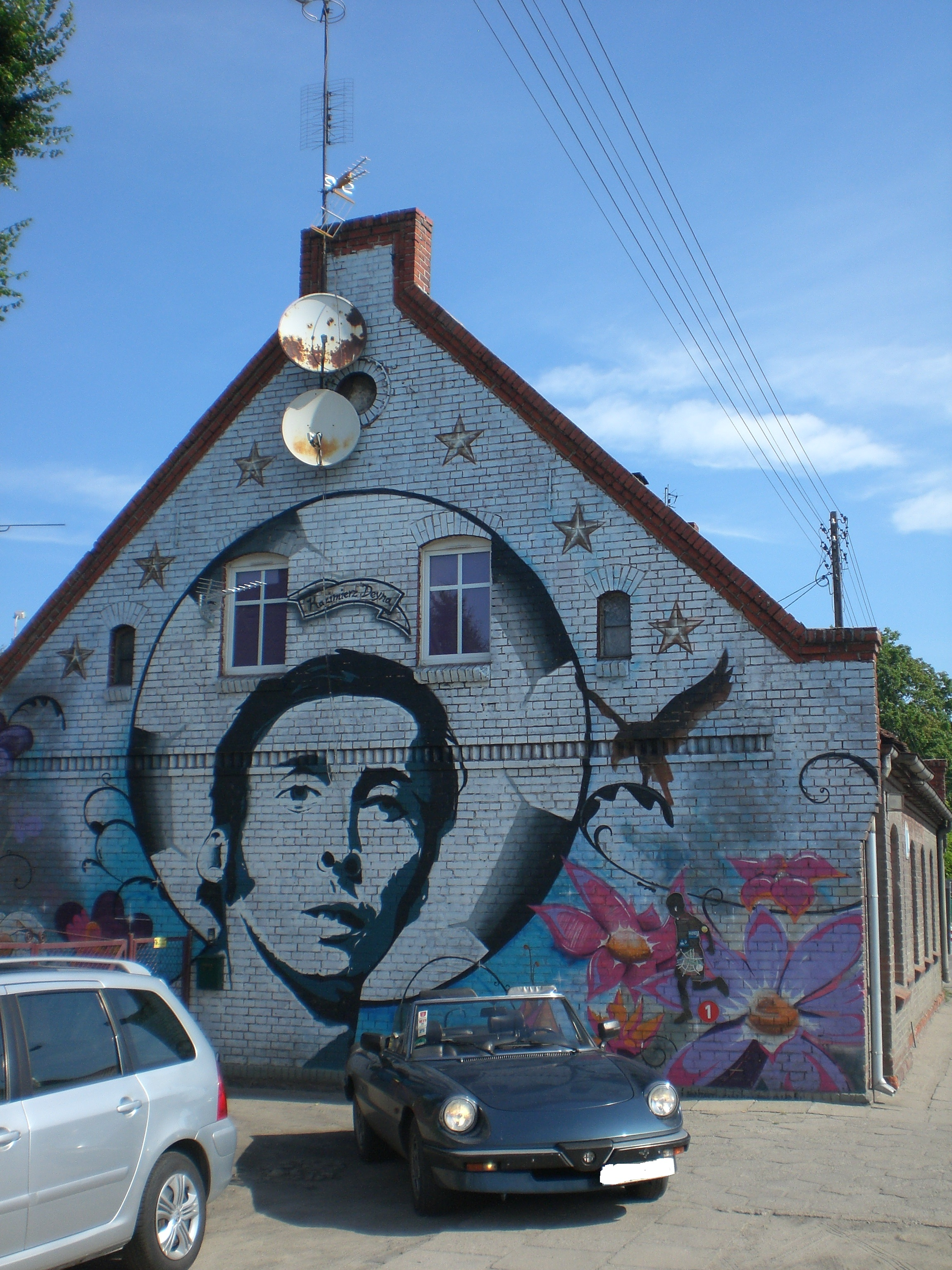
Kazimierz Deyna mural on his birth house

- Adolf Lesser (1851–1926), physician who specialized in forensic medicine
- Michael F. Blenski (1862–1932), Wisconsin politician
- John S. Flizikowski, (1868–1934), Chicago architect
- Adolf Wallenberg (1862–1949), internist and neurologist
- Ferdinand Noeldechen (1895–1951), general
- Theo Mackeben (1897–1953), pianist, conductor and composer, particularly of film music
- Kazimierz Deyna (1947–1989), soccer player, over 600 pro games and 97 for Poland
- Kazimierz Kropidłowski (1931–1998), long jumper, competed at the 1956 Summer Olympics
- Andrzej Grubba (1958–2005), table tennis player
- Henryk Jankowski (1936–2010), Roman Catholic priest and Member of Solidarity movement
- Władysław Wojtakajtis (1949–2016), swimmer, competed at the 1968 and 1972 Summer Olympics
- Maria Kamrowska (born 1966), heptathlete
- Paweł Papke (born 1977), volleyball player
- Piotr Wiśniewski (born 1982), footballer, who played 230 games for Lechia Gdańsk
- Tomasz Schuchardt (born 1986), actor
- Oktawia Nowacka (born 1991), modern pentathlete and bronze medalist in the 2016 Summer Olympics

== Twin towns – sister cities ==
Starogard Gdański is twinned with:

- Boryslav, Ukraine
- Diepholz, Germany
- Foshan, China
- Luohe, China
