= Wielkie Zajączkowo =

Village in Kociewie

- Village
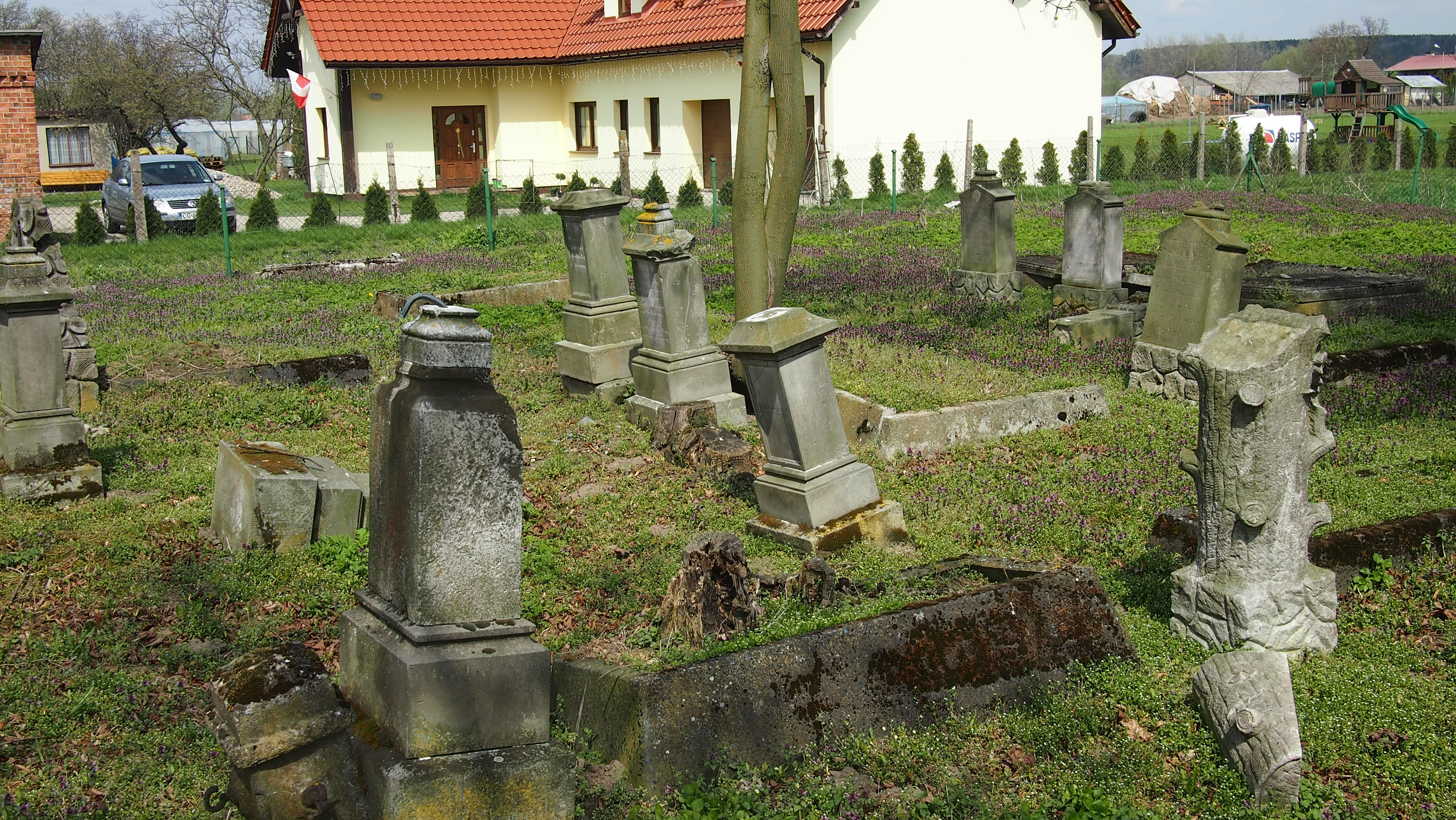
- The old Olender Mennonite cemetery in Wielkie Zajączkowo

- Location within Poland
- Coordinates: 53°33′N 18°45′E
- Country: Poland
- Voivodeship: Kuyavian-Pomeranian
- County: Świecie
- Gmina: Dragacz

Wielkie Zajączkowo [ˈvjɛlkʲɛ zajɔnt͡ʂˈkɔvɔ] is a village in the administrative district of Gmina Dragacz, within Świecie County, Kuyavian-Pomeranian Voivodeship, in north-central Poland. Wielkie Zajączkowo is located within the ethnocultural region of Kociewie.
