= Wielki Lubień =

Village in Kociewie

- Village
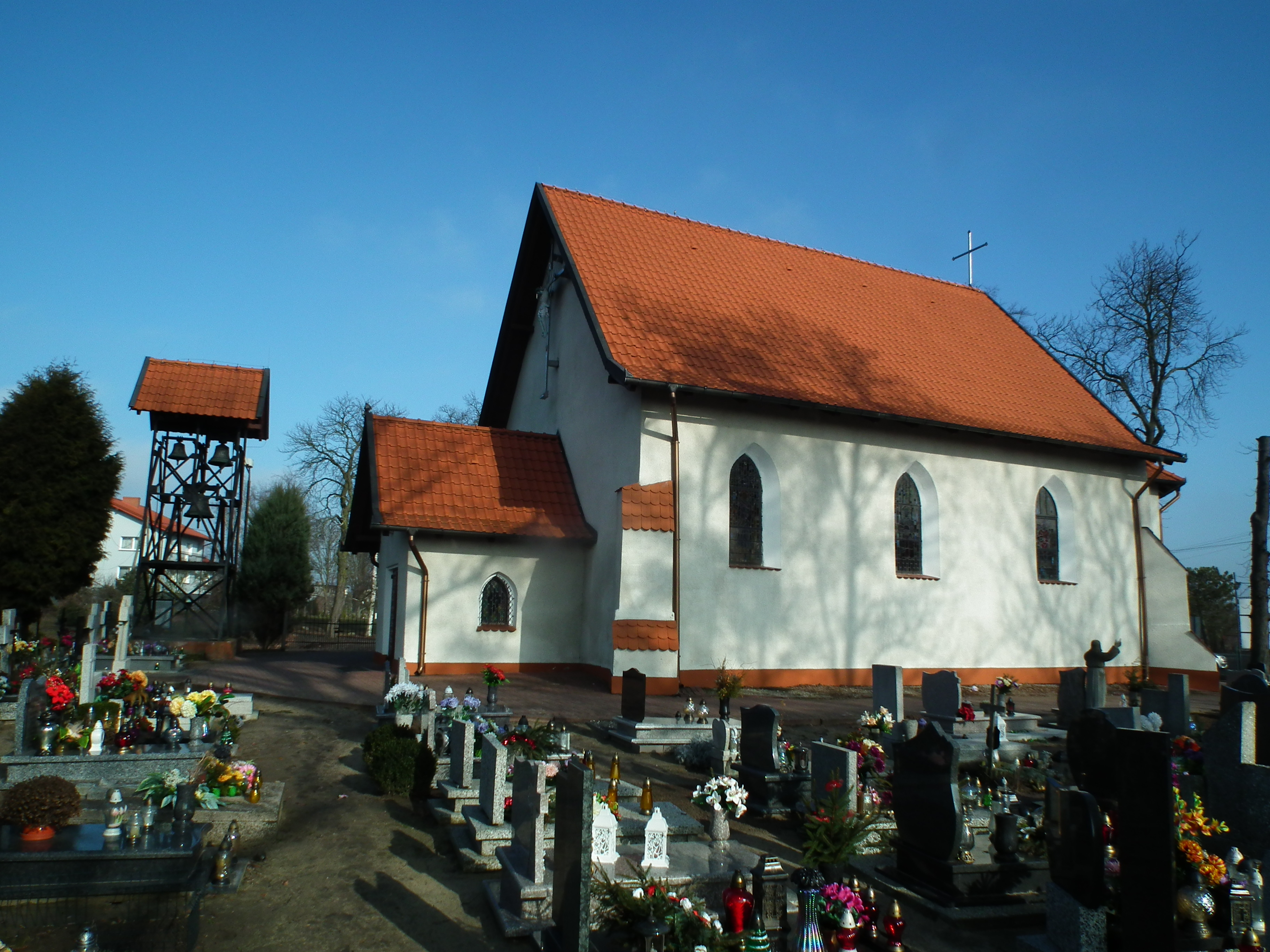
- Church of Saint James

- Location within Poland
- Coordinates: 53°31′N 18°44′E
- Country: Poland
- Voivodeship: Kuyavian-Pomeranian
- County: Świecie
- Gmina: Dragacz

Population
  - Total: 400

Wielki Lubień (Polish pronunciation: [ˈvjɛlkʲi ˈlubjɛj̃]) is a village in the administrative district of Gmina Dragacz, within Świecie County, Kuyavian-Pomeranian Voivodeship, in north-central Poland. Wielki Lubień is located within the ethnocultural region of Kociewie.
