= Mątawy =

Village in Kociewie

- Village
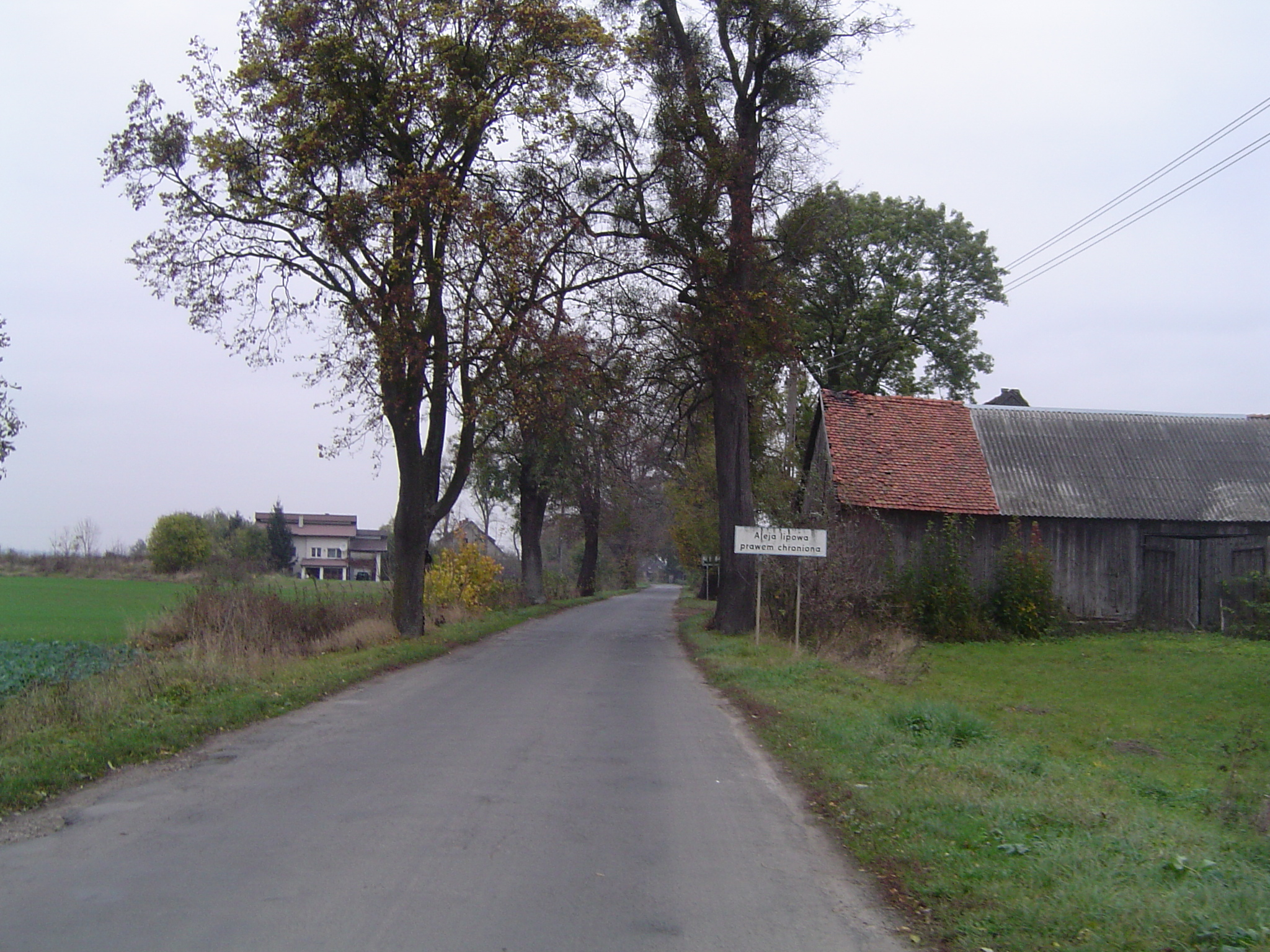

- Location within Poland
- Coordinates: 53°34′31″N 18°44′57″E
- Country: Poland
- Voivodeship: Kuyavian–Pomeranian
- County: Świecie
- Gmina: Nowe

Population
  - Total: 374
- SIMC: 0092930

Mątawy (formerly Frisian: Montau) is a village in the administrative district of Gmina Nowe, within Świecie County, Kuyavian–Pomeranian Voivodeship, in northern Poland. It is located within the ethnocultural region of Kociewie.

== History ==
The first mention of Mątawy in the historical record dates to the 14 century when it was granted privileges under Kulm law by the Teutonic state. In 1568 the village was first settled by Olender Mennonites taking advantage of religious freedom in the Kingdom of Poland. By 1624, 24 Olender families were recorded to be resident in the village. In the latter 1800s Mątawy contained 97 buildings, housing 466 inhabitants, the vast majority of whom were Protestant.

== Architecture ==
The village has eight existing Olender timber framed houses from the 19 century, numerous brick Olender houses, and a Mennonite church dating from 1898.

Notable buildings
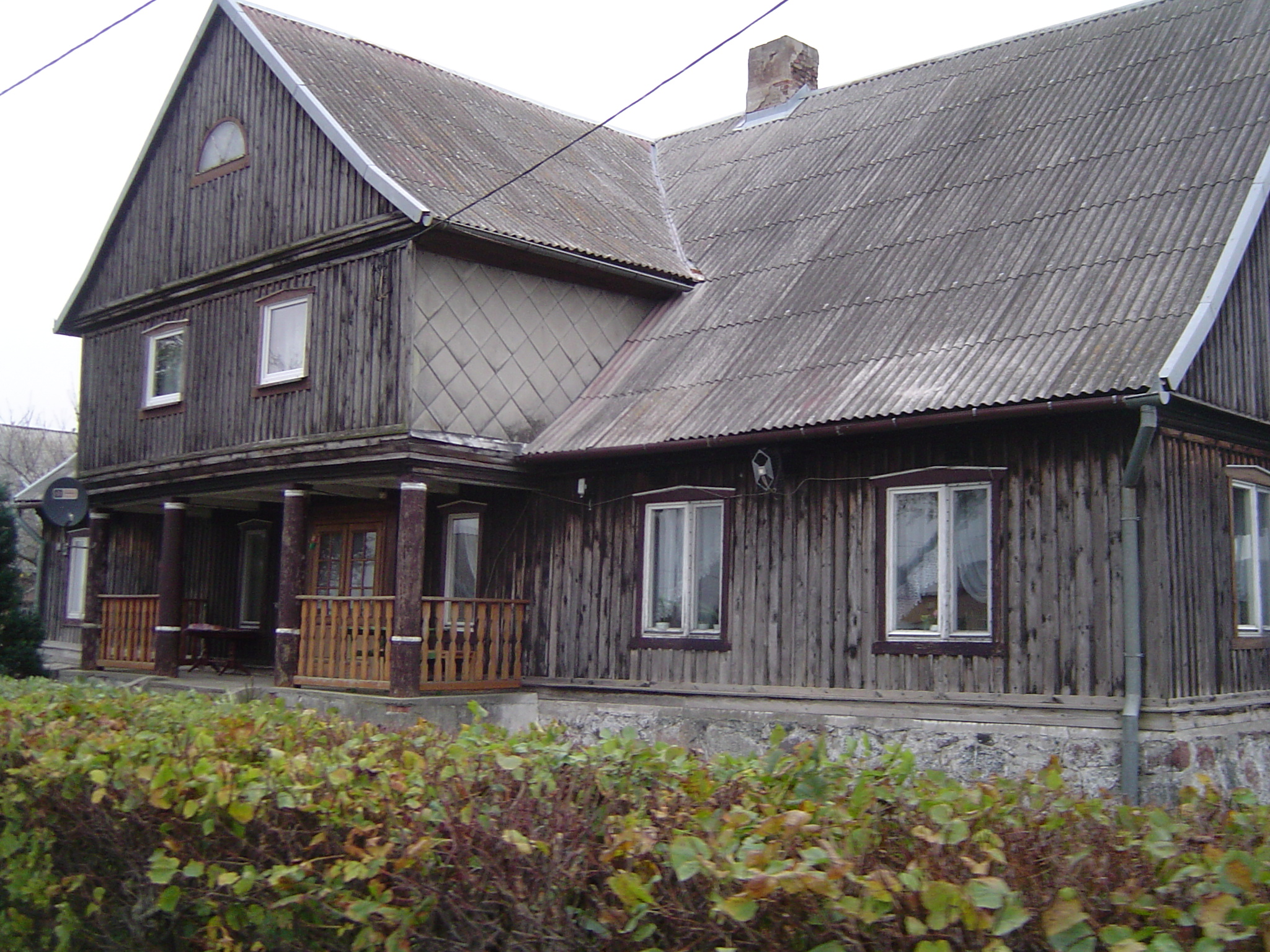
A surviving timber framed Olender house with portico, constructed in 1837

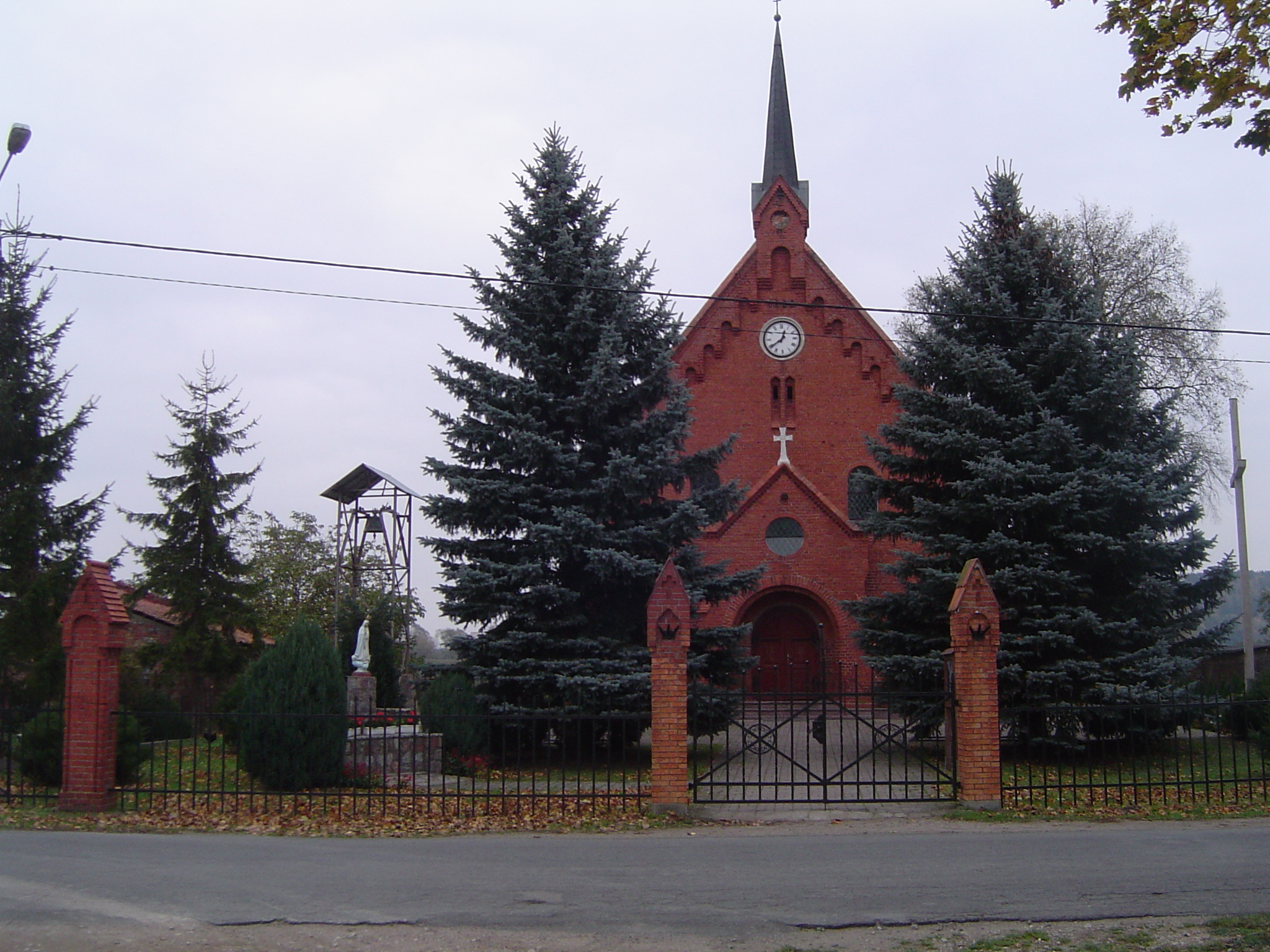
The former Mennonite church, currently the Church of The Most Holy Virgin Mary, Queen of Poland
