= Mątawa =

Location
- Country: Poland

Physical characteristics
- Source: Vistula
- Mouth
  - location: Kończyce, Kuyavian-Pomeranian Voivodeship
  - coordinates: 59°38′42″N 18°44′11″E
- Length: 59,3 km

Mątawa is a river in northern Poland, a left tributary of the Vistula River, (Kuyavian-Pomeranian Voivodeship), in the region of the South Pomeranian Lake District. The source of the Mątawa River is assumed to be the Konotop meadow (charms) north of the village of Przewodnik. It flows through Lake Mątasek.

The Mątawa is a river characterized by a "U" shape in its course. It flows in a southerly direction through the Tuchola Forest. The river on a section of about 33 km drains upland areas at a gradient of 59 m, then in the middle of its course it changes direction to the north. On the final stretch of about 26 km it reaches a gradient of only 4 m. Mątawa, overcoming from Borowy Młyn to Piła-Młyn small hills, creates numerous meanders, especially charming in the area of the so-called "Rulewska Switzerland".

Mątawa flows through the municipalities of Warlubie, Jeżewo, Dragacz, Nowe. It flows into the Vistula River. In its final section, in the area of the village of Kończyce, there is a pumping station. The banks of the Mątawa River are partially embanked in some places. About 70% of the river basin is located within the Vistula River Protected Landscape Area.
