= Jeżewnica, Kuyavian-Pomeranian Voivodeship =

Settlement in Kociewie

Jeżewnica
- Hamlet
- Location within Poland
- Coordinates: 53°40′1″N 18°30′39″E
- Country: Poland
- Voivodeship: Kuyavian-Pomeranian
- County: Świecie
- Gmina: Warlubie

Jeżewnica [jɛʐɛvˈnit͡sa] is a hamlet in the administrative district of Gmina Warlubie, within Świecie County, Kuyavian-Pomeranian Voivodeship, in north-central Poland.
