= Nowa Huta, Kuyavian-Pomeranian Voivodeship =

Settlement in Kociewie

Nowa Huta
- Village
- Location within Poland
- Coordinates: 53°39′54″N 18°25′0″E
- Country: Poland
- Voivodeship: Kuyavian-Pomeranian
- County: Świecie
- Gmina: Warlubie

Nowa Huta [ˈnɔva ˈxuta] is a village in the administrative district of Gmina Warlubie, within Świecie County, Kuyavian-Pomeranian Voivodeship, in north-central Poland.
