= Komorsk =

Village in Kociewie

- Village
- Location within Poland
- Coordinates: 53°34′29″N 18°40′26″E
- Country: Poland
- Voivodeship: Kuyavian-Pomeranian
- County: Świecie
- Gmina: Warlubie
- Population: 380

Komorsk [ˈkɔmɔrsk] is a village in the administrative district of Gmina Warlubie, within Świecie County, Kuyavian-Pomeranian Voivodeship, in north-central Poland.
