= Bąkowo =

Bąkowo may refer to the following places:

- Bąkowo, Greater Poland Voivodeship (west-central Poland)
- Bąkowo, Świecie County in Kuyavian-Pomeranian Voivodeship (north-central Poland)
- Bąkowo, Bytów County in Pomeranian Voivodeship (north Poland)
- Bąkowo, Gdańsk County in Pomeranian Voivodeship (north Poland)
- Bąkowo, Lębork County in Pomeranian Voivodeship (north Poland)
