= Wałkowiska =

Village in Kociewie

- Village
- Location within Poland
- Coordinates: 53°34′2″N 18°21′11″E
- Country: Poland
- Voivodeship: Kuyavian-Pomeranian
- County: Świecie
- Gmina: Osie
- Population: 375

Wałkowiska [vau̯kɔˈviska] is a village in the administrative district of Gmina Osie, within Świecie County, Kuyavian-Pomeranian Voivodeship, in north-central Poland.
