= Wętfie =

Wętfie may refer to the following places in Poland:

- Wętfie, Kuyavian-Pomeranian Voivodeship
- Wętfie, Pomeranian Voivodeship
