= Kurzejewo =

Village in Kociewie

- Village
- Location within Poland
- Coordinates: 53°36′13″N 18°38′31″E
- Country: Poland
- Voivodeship: Kuyavian-Pomeranian
- County: Świecie
- Gmina: Warlubie
- Population: 170

Kurzejewo [kuʐɛˈjɛvɔ] is a village in the administrative district of Gmina Warlubie, within Świecie County, Kuyavian-Pomeranian Voivodeship, in north-central Poland.
