= Jędrzejewo, Kuyavian-Pomeranian Voivodeship =

Village in Kociewie

Jędrzejewo
- Village
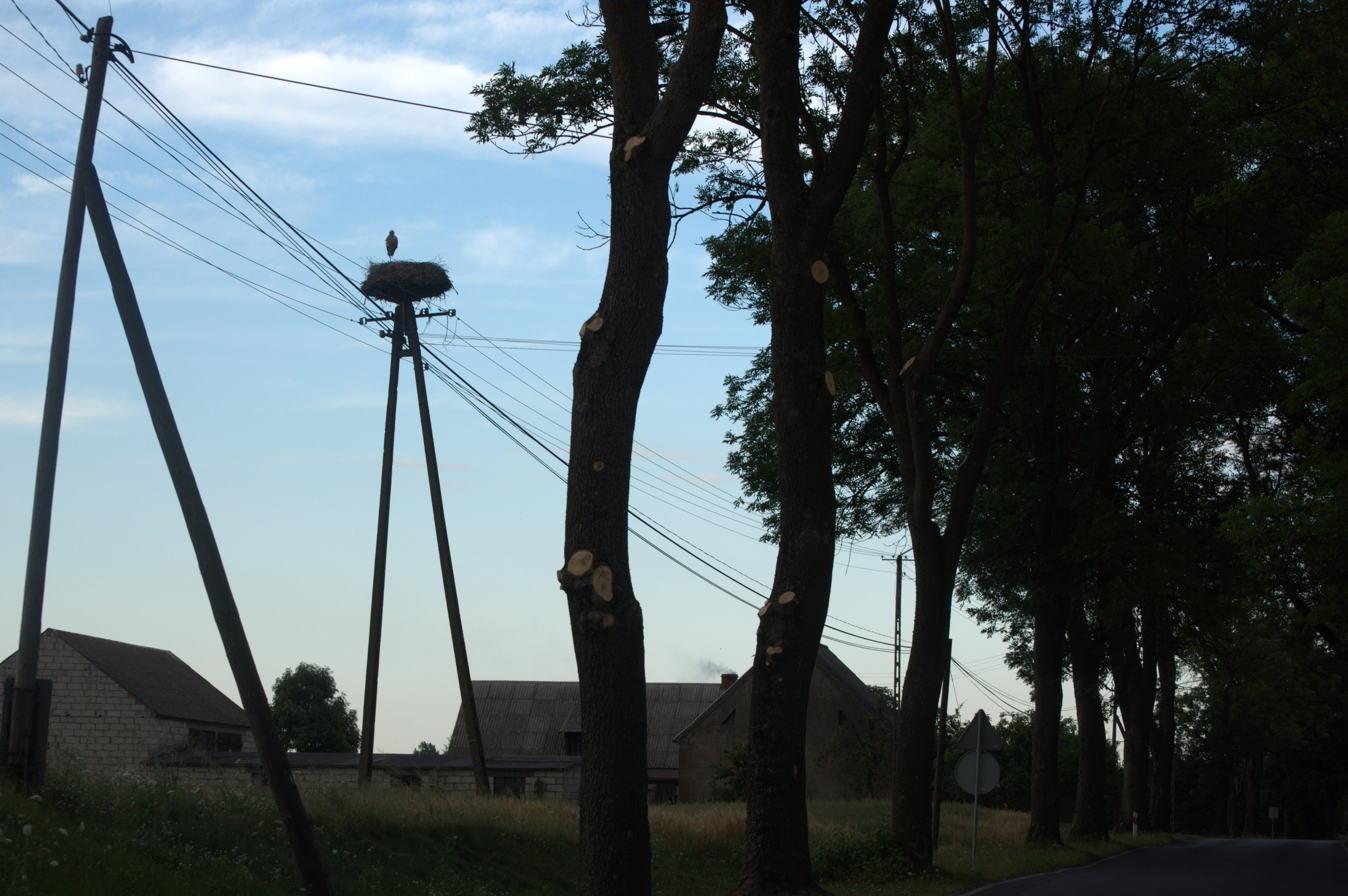

- Location within Poland
- Coordinates: 53°31′16″N 18°11′48″E
- Country: Poland
- Voivodeship: Kuyavian-Pomeranian
- County: Świecie
- Gmina: Lniano

Jędrzejewo [jɛndʐɛˈjɛvɔ] is a village in the administrative district of Gmina Lniano, within Świecie County, Kuyavian-Pomeranian Voivodeship, in north-central Poland.
