= Przewodnik =

Przewodnik may refer to:

- Przewodnik, Kuyavian-Pomeranian Voivodeship, a village in north-central Poland
- Przewodnik, one of the ranks in Polish Scouting
