= Brzemiona =

Village in Kuyavian-Pomeranian Voivodeship, Poland

- Village
- Location within Poland
- Coordinates: 53°34′N 18°15′E
- Country: Poland
- Voivodeship: Kuyavian-Pomeranian
- County: Świecie
- Gmina: Lniano
- Time zone: UTC+1 (CET)
  - Summer (DST): UTC+2 (CEST)
- Vehicle registration: CSW

Brzemiona [bʐɛˈmjɔna] is a village in the administrative district of Gmina Lniano, within Świecie County, Kuyavian-Pomeranian Voivodeship, in north-central Poland. It is located within the ethnocultural region of Kociewie in the historic region of Pomerania.
