= Krzewiny, Kuyavian-Pomeranian Voivodeship =

Settlement in Kociewie

Krzewiny
- Hamlet
- Location within Poland
- Coordinates: 53°37′56″N 18°33′45″E
- Country: Poland
- Voivodeship: Kuyavian-Pomeranian
- County: Świecie
- Gmina: Warlubie
- Population: 50

Krzewiny [kʂɛˈvinɨ] is a hamlet in the administrative district of Gmina Warlubie, within Świecie County, Kuyavian-Pomeranian Voivodeship, in north-central Poland.
