= Radańska =

Village in Kociewie

- Village
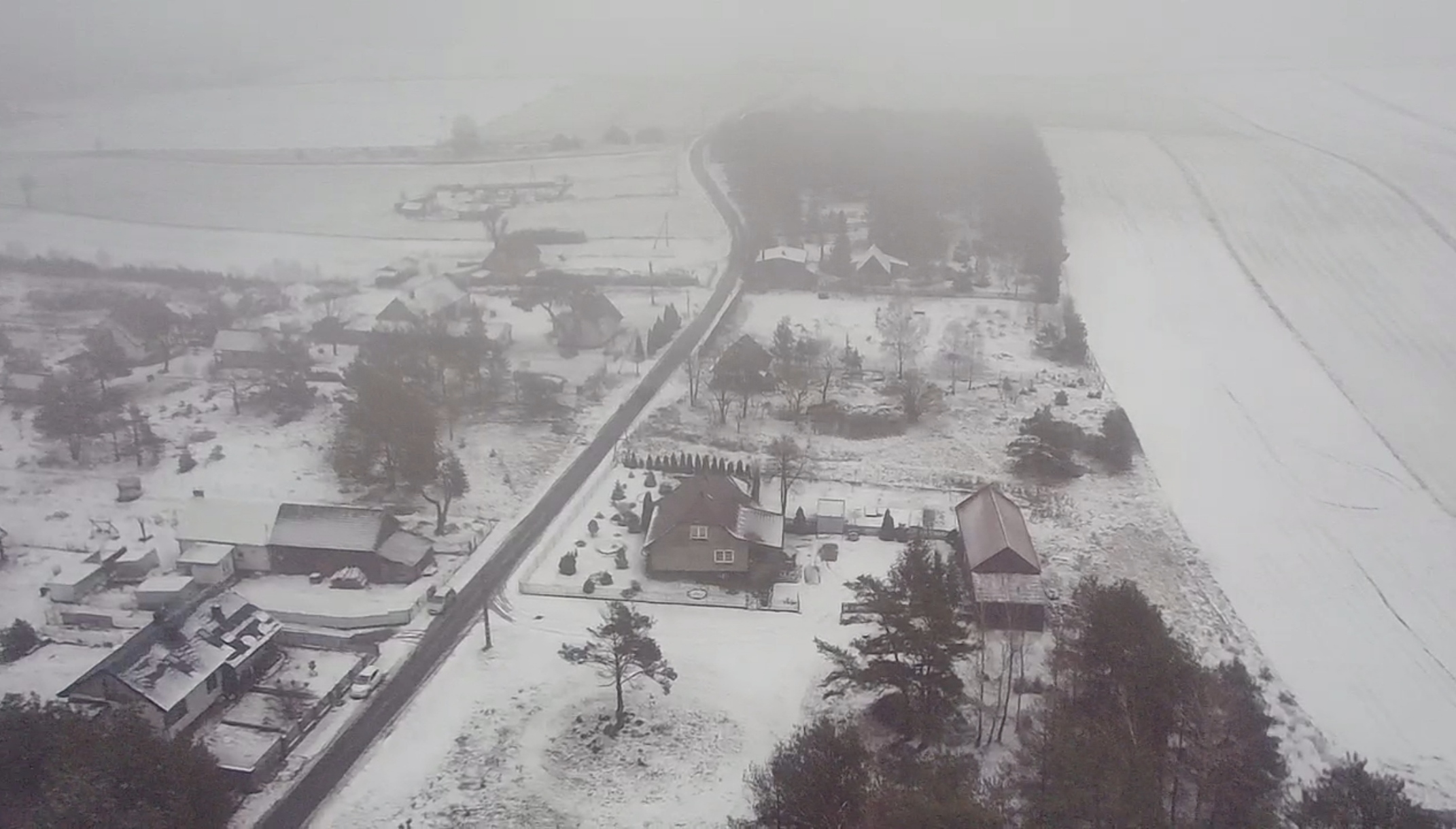

- Location within Poland
- Coordinates: 53°37′7″N 18°20′0″E
- Country: Poland
- Voivodeship: Kuyavian-Pomeranian
- County: Świecie
- Gmina: Osie
- Population: 200

Radańska [raˈdaɲska] is a village in the administrative district of Gmina Osie, within Świecie County, Kuyavian-Pomeranian Voivodeship, in north-central Poland.
