= Lipinki, Świecie County =

Village in Kociewie

Lipinki
- Village
- Location within Poland
- Coordinates: 53°38′N 18°28′E
- Country: Poland
- Voivodeship: Kuyavian-Pomeranian
- County: Świecie
- Gmina: Warlubie
- Population: 501

Lipinki [lʲiˈpʲiŋkʲi] is a village in the administrative district of Gmina Warlubie, within Świecie County, Kuyavian-Pomeranian Voivodeship, in north-central Poland.
