= Blizawy =

Village in Kuyavian-Pomeranian Voivodeship, Poland

- Village
- Location within Poland
- Coordinates: 53°39′51″N 18°32′11″E
- Country: Poland
- Voivodeship: Kuyavian-Pomeranian
- County: Świecie
- Gmina: Warlubie
- Time zone: UTC+1 (CET)
  - Summer (DST): UTC+2 (CEST)
- Vehicle registration: CSW

Blizawy [bliˈzavɨ] is a village in the administrative district of Gmina Warlubie, in Świecie County, Kuyavian-Pomeranian Voivodeship, in north-central Poland. It is located within the ethnocultural region of Kociewie in the historic region of Pomerania.
