= Ostrowite, Świecie County =

Village in Kociewie

Ostrowite
- Village
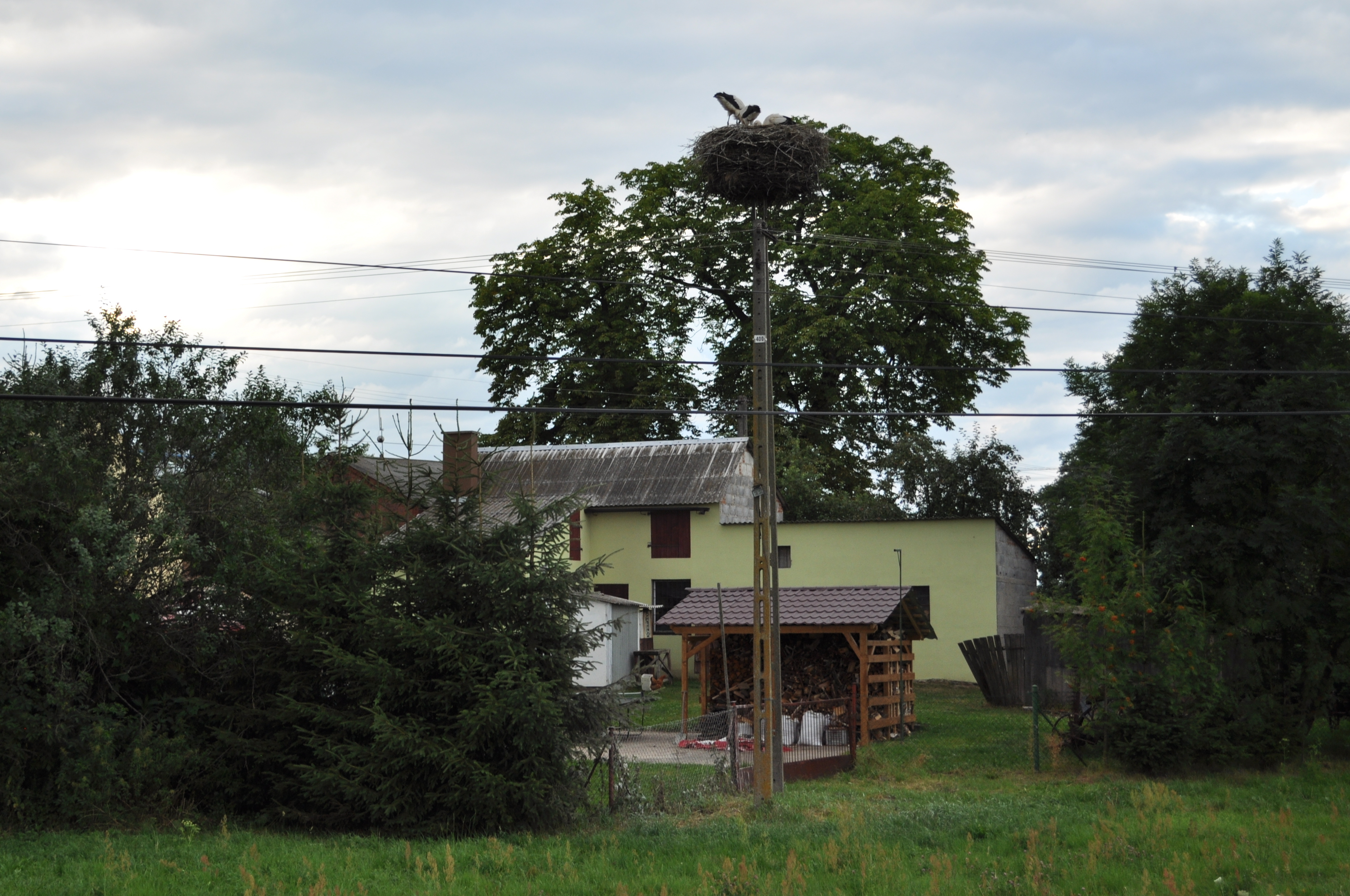

- Location within Poland
- Coordinates: 53°30′20″N 18°9′55″E
- Country: Poland
- Voivodeship: Kuyavian-Pomeranian
- County: Świecie
- Gmina: Lniano

Ostrowite [ɔstrɔˈvitɛ] is a village in the administrative district of Gmina Lniano, within Świecie County, Kuyavian-Pomeranian Voivodeship, in north-central Poland.
