= Łążek, Kuyavian-Pomeranian Voivodeship =

Village in Kociewie

Łążek
- Village
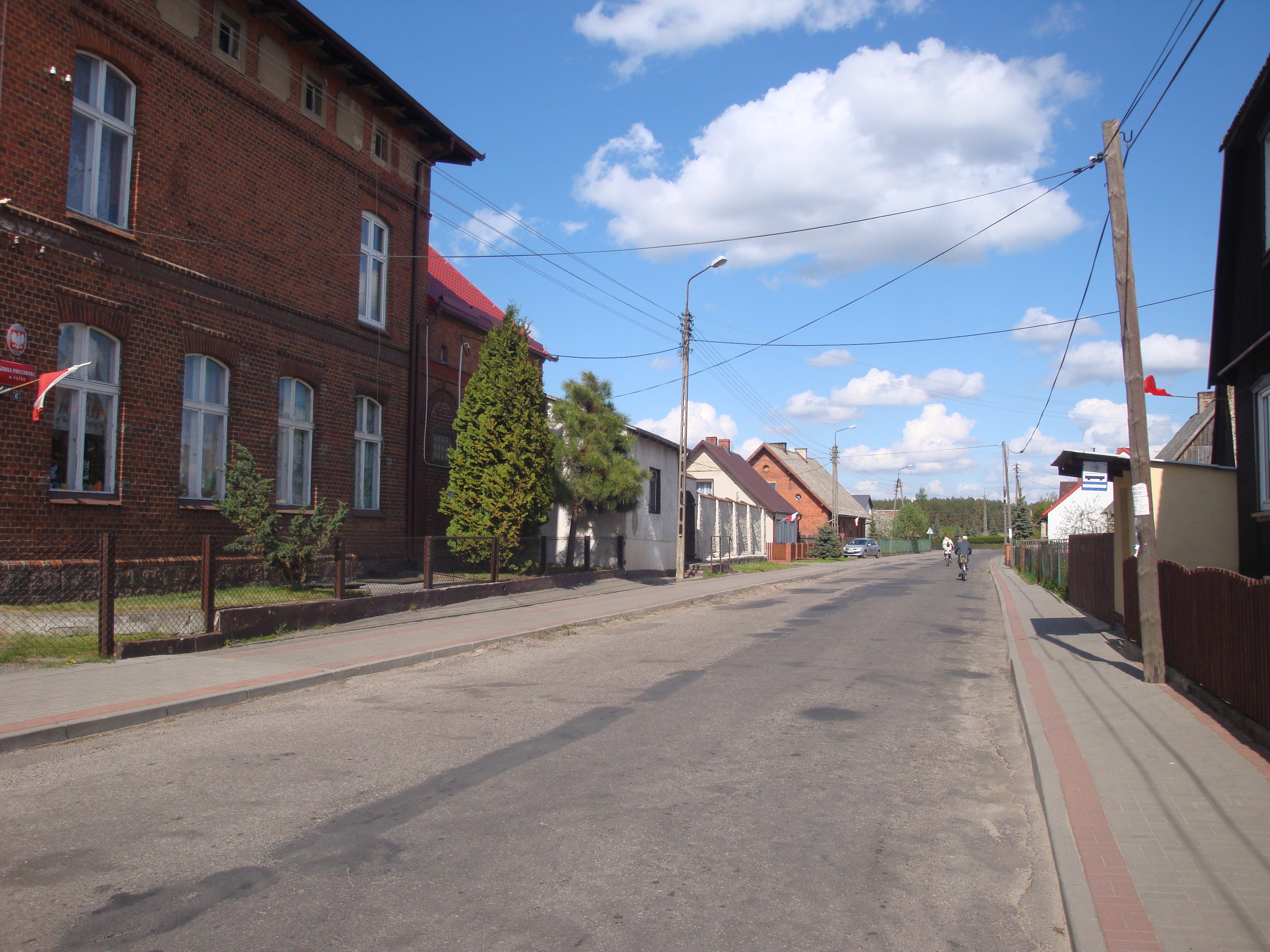

- Location within Poland
- Coordinates: 53°38′20″N 18°13′37″E
- Country: Poland
- Voivodeship: Kuyavian-Pomeranian
- County: Świecie
- Gmina: Osie
- Population: 382

Łążek [ˈwɔ̃ʐɛk] is a village in the administrative district of Gmina Osie, within Świecie County, Kuyavian-Pomeranian Voivodeship, in north-central Poland.
