= Jeziorki, Świecie County =

Village in Kociewie

Jeziorki
- Village
- Location within Poland
- Coordinates: 53°29′N 18°12′E
- Country: Poland
- Voivodeship: Kuyavian-Pomeranian
- County: Świecie
- Gmina: Lniano

Jeziorki [jɛˈʑɔrki] is a village in the administrative district of Gmina Lniano, within Świecie County, Kuyavian-Pomeranian Voivodeship, in north-central Poland.
