= Wierzchy, Kuyavian-Pomeranian Voivodeship =

Village in Kociewie

Wierzchy
- Village
- Location within Poland
- Coordinates: 53°36′13″N 18°14′45″E
- Country: Poland
- Voivodeship: Kuyavian-Pomeranian
- County: Świecie
- Gmina: Osie
- Population: 224

Wierzchy [ˈvjɛʂxɨ] is a village in the administrative district of Gmina Osie, within Świecie County, Kuyavian-Pomeranian Voivodeship, in north-central Poland.
