= Mukrz =

Village in Kociewie

- Village
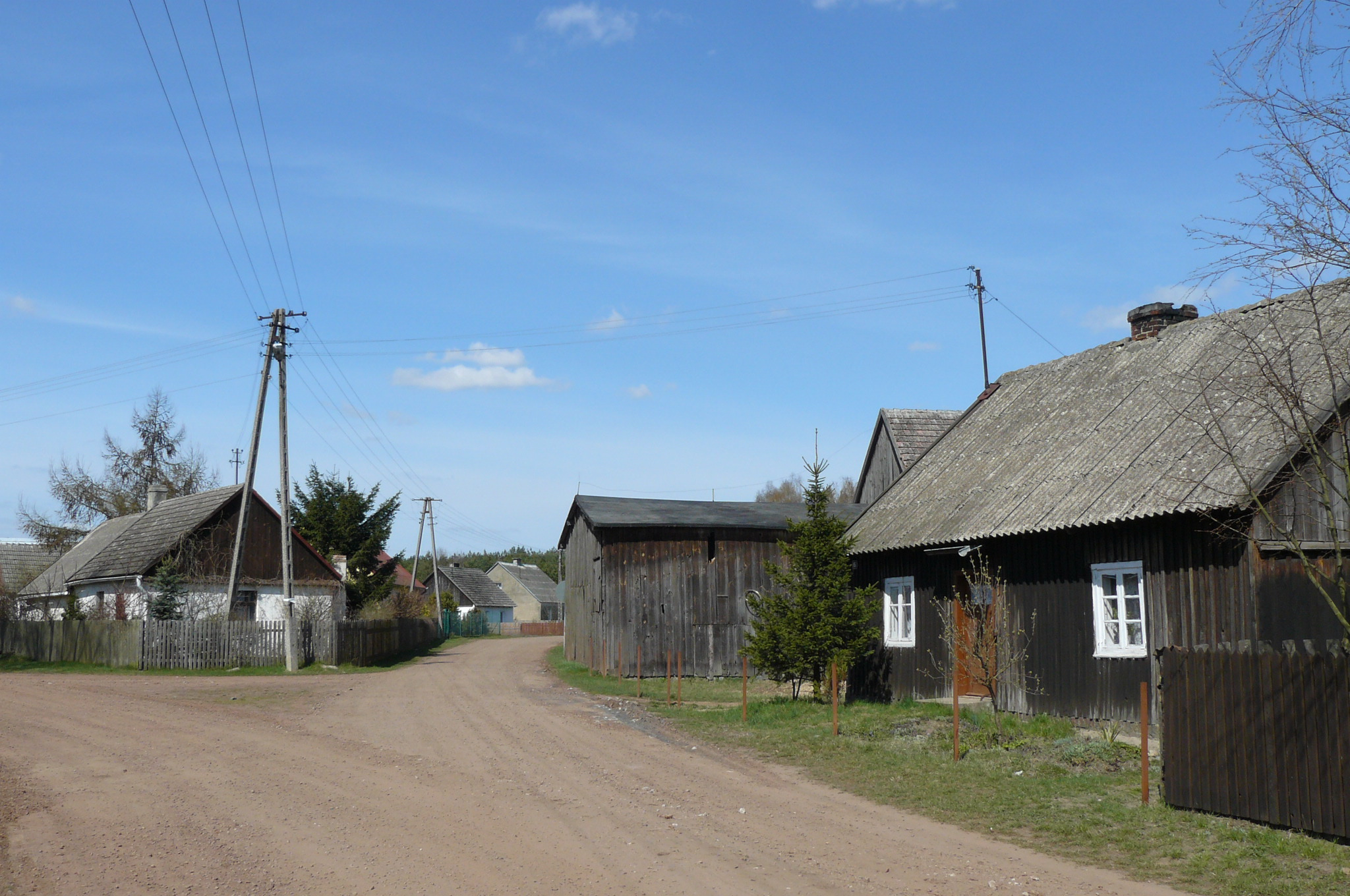

- Location within Poland
- Coordinates: 53°32′N 18°8′E
- Country: Poland
- Voivodeship: Kuyavian-Pomeranian
- County: Świecie
- Gmina: Lniano

Mukrz [mukʂ] is a village in the administrative district of Gmina Lniano, within Świecie County, Kuyavian-Pomeranian Voivodeship, in north-central Poland.
