= Siemkowo =

Siemkowo may refer to the following places in Poland:

- Siemkowo, Kuyavian-Pomeranian Voivodeship
- Siemkowo, Warmian-Masurian Voivodeship
