= Wielki Komorsk =

Village in Kociewie

- Village
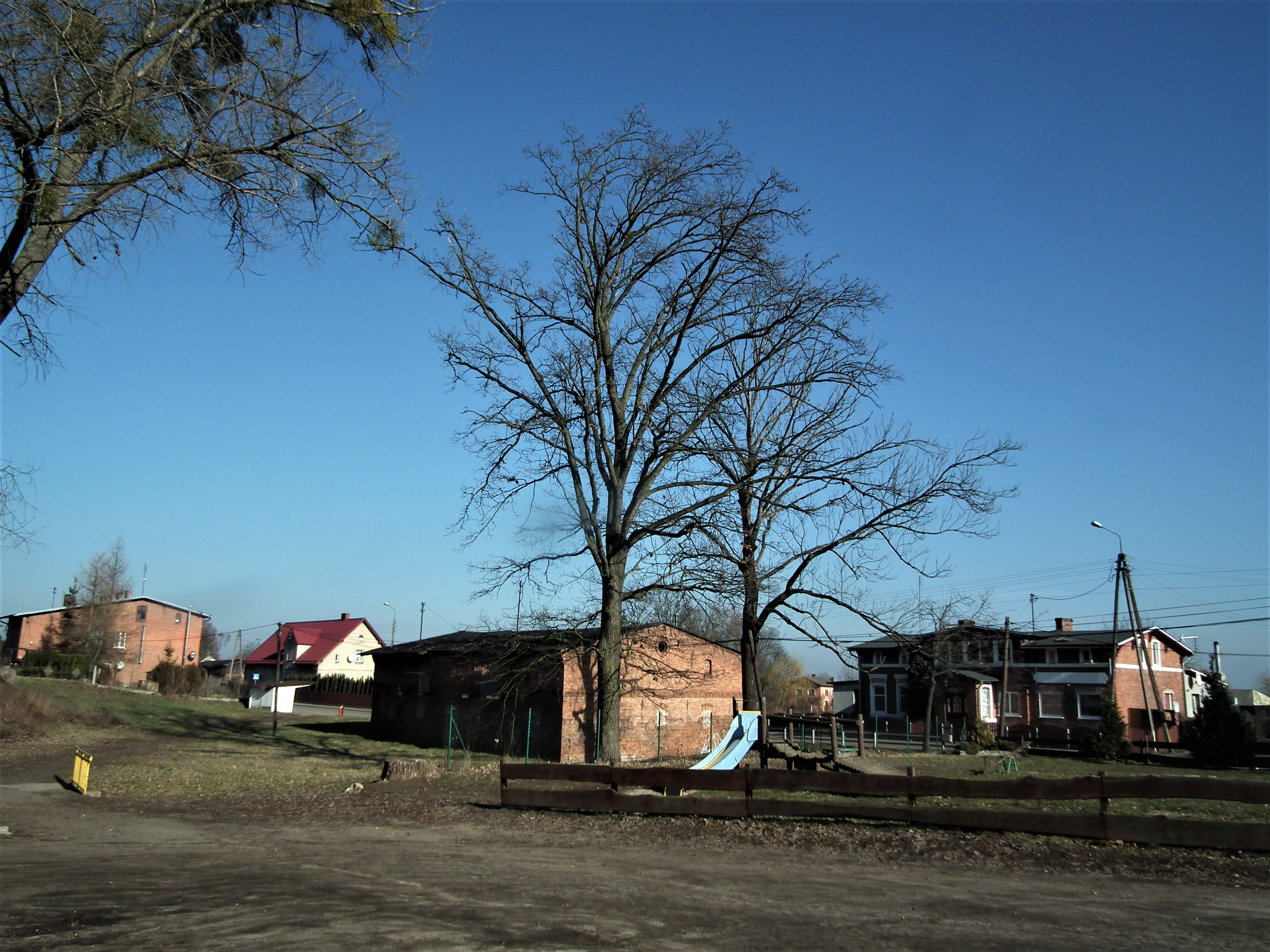

- Location within Poland
- Coordinates: 53°35′N 18°40′E
- Country: Poland
- Voivodeship: Kuyavian-Pomeranian
- County: Świecie
- Gmina: Warlubie
- Population: 1,000

Wielki Komorsk (Polish pronunciation: [ˈvjɛlkʲi ˈkɔmɔrsk]) is a village in the administrative district of Gmina Warlubie, within Świecie County, Kuyavian-Pomeranian Voivodeship, in north-central Poland.
