= Stara Huta, Kuyavian-Pomeranian Voivodeship =

Village in Kociewie

Stara Huta
- Village
- Location within Poland
- Coordinates: 53°39′2″N 18°26′56″E
- Country: Poland
- Voivodeship: Kuyavian-Pomeranian
- County: Świecie
- Gmina: Warlubie
- Population: 70

Stara Huta [ˈstara ˈxuta] is a village in the administrative district of Gmina Warlubie, within Świecie County, Kuyavian-Pomeranian Voivodeship, in north-central Poland.
