= Jaszcz, Kuyavian-Pomeranian Voivodeship =

Village in Kociewie

Jaszcz
- Village
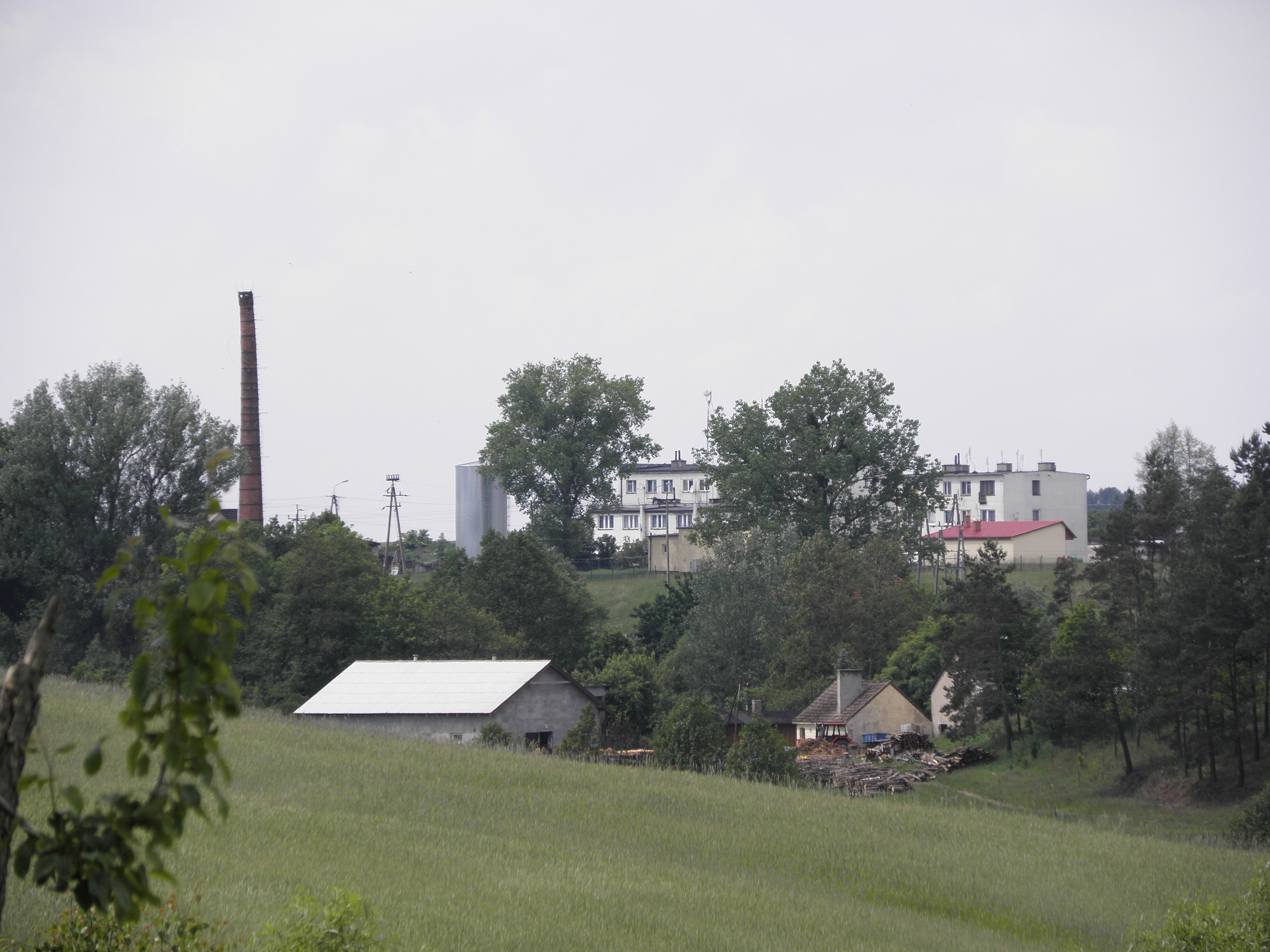

- Location within Poland
- Coordinates: 53°34′11″N 18°25′16″E
- Country: Poland
- Voivodeship: Kuyavian-Pomeranian
- County: Świecie
- Gmina: Osie
- Population: 220

Jaszcz [jaʂt͡ʂ] is a village in the administrative district of Gmina Osie, within Świecie County, Kuyavian-Pomeranian Voivodeship, in north-central Poland.
