= Stara Rzeka =

Stara Rzeka may refer to the following places in Poland:

- Stara Rzeka, Lower Silesian Voivodeship (south-west Poland)
- Stara Rzeka, Kuyavian-Pomeranian Voivodeship (north-central Poland)
