= Kuźnica, Kuyavian-Pomeranian Voivodeship =

Settlement in Kociewie

Kuźnica
- Hamlet
- Location within Poland
- Coordinates: 53°37′57″N 18°31′43″E
- Country: Poland
- Voivodeship: Kuyavian-Pomeranian
- County: Świecie
- Gmina: Warlubie

Kuźnica (Polish pronunciation: [kuʑˈɲit͡sa]) is a hamlet in the administrative district of Gmina Warlubie, within Świecie County, Kuyavian-Pomeranian Voivodeship, in north-central Poland.
