= Błądzim, Świecie County =

Village in Kuyavian-Pomeranian Voivodeship, Poland

Błądzim
- Village
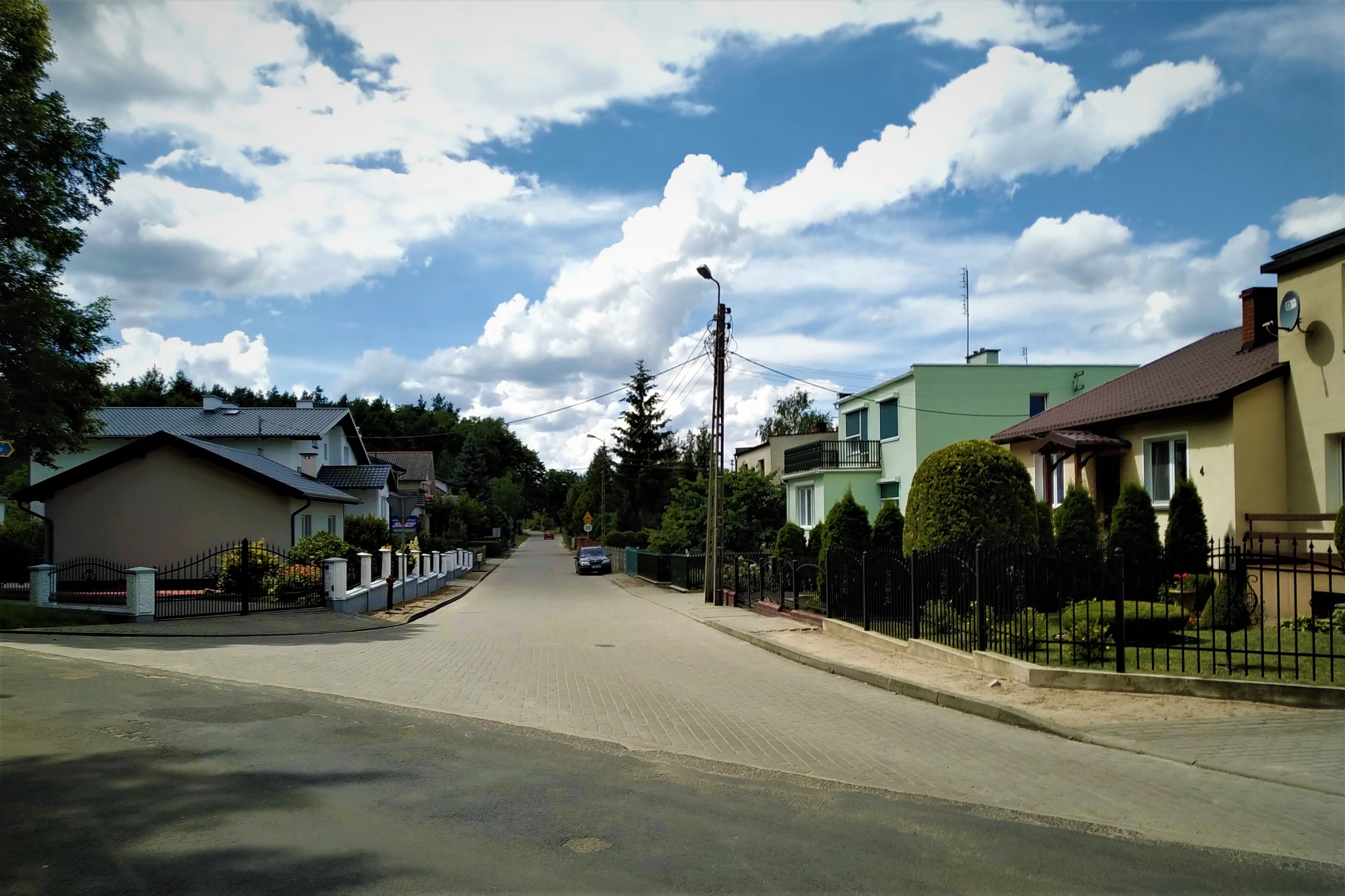

- Location within Poland
- Coordinates: 53°29′27″N 18°8′17″E
- Country: Poland
- Voivodeship: Kuyavian-Pomeranian
- County: Świecie
- Gmina: Lniano
- Elevation: 103 m (338 ft)

Population
  - Total: 610
- Time zone: UTC+1 (CET)
  - Summer (DST): UTC+2 (CEST)
- Vehicle registration: CSW

Błądzim (Polish pronunciation: [ˈbwɔɲd͡ʑim]) is a village in the administrative district of Gmina Lniano, within Świecie County, Kuyavian-Pomeranian Voivodeship, in north-central Poland.

== History ==
In 1860–1862, the village was hit by a cholera epidemic.

During the German invasion of Poland at the start of World War II, on 3 September 1939, it was the site of a battle between Polish and German troops. Afterwards it was occupied by Germany until 1945. Some Italian prisoners-of-war died in German captivity in the area.

== Sights ==
There are mass graves of Polish and Italian soldiers and a grave of one German soldier from World War II in Błądzim.

== Bibliography ==
- Kruczkowska, Krystyna (2006). Stare cmentarze, samotne mogiły i miejsca pamięci na terenie gminy Lniano (in Polish).
