= Płochocin =

Płochocin may refer to the following places:

- Płochocin, Kuyavian-Pomeranian Voivodeship (north-central Poland)
- Płochocin, Masovian Voivodeship (east-central Poland)
- Płochocin, West Pomeranian Voivodeship (north-west Poland)
