= Miedzno =

Miedzno may refer to the following places:

- Miedzno, Kuyavian-Pomeranian Voivodeship (north-central Poland)
- Miedzno, Kościerzyna County in Pomeranian Voivodeship (north Poland)
- Miedzno, Słupsk County in Pomeranian Voivodeship (north Poland)
- Miedzno, West Pomeranian Voivodeship (north-west Poland)
- Miedźno, Łódź Voivodeship (central Poland)
- Miedźno, Silesian Voivodeship (south Poland)
