= Pruskie =

Village in Kociewie

- Village
- Location within Poland
- Coordinates: 53°36′6″N 18°12′23″E
- Country: Poland
- Voivodeship: Kuyavian-Pomeranian
- County: Świecie
- Gmina: Osie
- Population: 150

Pruskie (Polish pronunciation: [ˈpruskʲɛ]) is a village in the administrative district of Gmina Osie, within Świecie County, Kuyavian-Pomeranian Voivodeship, in north-central Poland.
