= Józef Makowski =

Polish sculptor and painter, 20th century

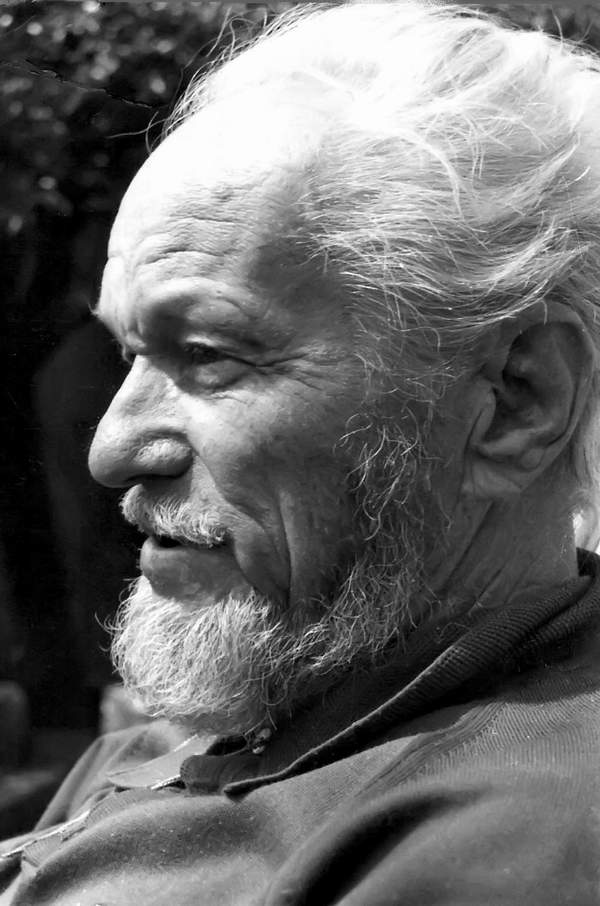
- Picture of Józef Makowski
- Born: 19 August 1914; Thorn, German Empire
- Died: 6 October 1997 (aged 83); Bydgoszcz, Poland
- Resting place: Catholic cemetery of the Holy Trinity in Bydgoszcz; 53°07′17″N 17°57′56″E
- Known for: Sculpture
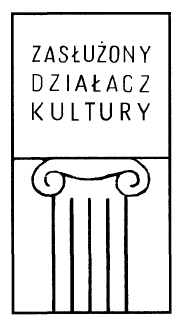
- Awards

Józef Makowski (1914–1997), was a Polish sculptor and painter whose works are associated with Bydgoszcz.

== Biography ==
=== Youth ===
Józef Makowski was born in Toruń, then part of the German Empire, on 19 August 1914. He was the son of Józef and Anna née Besdun.

In Toruń, he attended the gimnasium "Nicolaus Copernicus". In 1935, he underwent training at the Reserve Cadet School in Brodnica, then Strasburg in Westpreußen. From that period dates one of his first works, a bust of Marshal Piłsudski.

After getting his matura, Józef studied from 1936 to 1939 at the Academy of Fine Arts in Warsaw, in the studio of prof. Tadeusz Breyer, working on sculpture and painting (portraits). He also started to appear in regional exhibitions.

=== Second World War ===
During World War II, Makowski was a Home Army (Polish: Armia Krajowa) second lieutenant of the 4th Infantry Division. Under the nom de guerre of "Ziuk", he served in the 67th Infantry Regiment.

Captured and wounded after the defeat, he was moved to the hospital of the Altergrabow camp. After recovery, he was placed in Sandbostel Stalag X-B, where he met Konstanty Ildefons Gałczyński, Roman Bratny and Jan Dobraczyński. From his friendship with Gałczyński, Józef Makowski made several portraits for the Polish poet.

=== Post War activity ===
Back to civilian life, Józef Makowski had various jobs: he participated in the decoration of the "industrial exhibition" that took place for the 600th anniversary of Bydgoszcz. Then he was the artistic director of a stone workshop, before working at the "Building ceramics factory" (Polish: Fordońskie zakłady ceramiki budowlanej) in Fordon. In 1947 he was employed as an announcer at the Polish Radio.

Makowski associated mainly his artistic activity with the city of Bydgoszcz. His most remarkable works include the following elements:

- In the 1950s, Makowski realized 4 stone fishes gushing out water, placed in a pool to replace the monumental fountain "The Deluge" (Polish: Potop). Melted down by German forces in 1942, the monument was located in the heart of the city, on Plac Wolności. Makowski's fishes were removed in 2010, when the colossal fountain started to be rebuilt. Stored away for more than 40 years, they have been restored by the University of Science and Technology. The city of Bydgoszcz has been putting them back into display since 2 June 2022, on the northern waterfront of the Mill Island.
- In 1969, the sculptor designed a monument called "The broken rose" (Polish: Złamana róża), in memoriam of 50 junior high school students murdered on 5 September 1939 by the Nazis. The laying obelisk-like work stands in Bydgoszcz's Jan Kochanowski Park.
- The 1971 memorial in the Bydgoszcz forest of Bielice, which was dedicated to the 51 citizens of the Szwederowo district murdered by the Nazis on 5 December 1939.
- Józef Makowski created between 1973 and 1975, two large outdoor sculptures, Frédéric Chopin and Ignacy Jan Paderewski. They are part of the outdoor gallery of monuments to composers and virtuosos of the Pomeranian Philharmonic.
- On 31 August 1975 he realized a grand memorial on the hill above the "Valley of Death" (Polish: Dolina Śmierci), dedicated to the inhabitants of Bydgoszcz mass-murdered in this place in September–October 1939. Its composition portrays detached ears of grain on top of high columns, symbolizing the hands of the martyrs reaching out for the sky.

The author himself commented on his monument:

"This is one of the most beautiful places in Poland to display, unfortunately, a sad monument. I dreamed of raising an architectural accent as high as possible above the city. I designed it from twenty-seven-metre-long pipes, which I called stems, ending in blooming bunches of flowers. At the very base of this monument – death, and at the very top – blooming life."

- In 1980, was unveiled the "Monument to the Polish aviators" (Polish: Pomnik Lotników Polskich). It stands in the district of Błonie and commemorates Bydgoszcz long aviation tradition.

In addition, Józef Makowski realized interior design, such as for the Pharmacy Under the Swan in Gdańsk Street.

Furthermore, he was also a regular graphic designer for the local newspaper "Gazeta Pomorska" and the author of one of its vignettes.

Some of his sketches were exhibited at the Pomeranian Army Museum in Bydgoszcz, in two sessions: "Warsaw Insurgents' Gallery" (Polish: Galeria Powstańców Warszawskich) and "Warsaw Insurgents in Caricature" (Polish: Powstańcy Warszawscy w Karykaturze). During his post-war career, he was participated in national (e.g. Radom, Zakopane) and foreign exhibitions (Florence, 1968).

Makowski lived in Bydgoszcz (Błonie district) until the end of his life. In 1994, celebrating his 80th anniversary, a specific exhibition was organized at the Municipal Art Gallery of Bydgoszcz.

Józef Makowski died on 6 October 1997. He was buried at the Holy Trinity Catholic Cemetery in Bydgoszcz.

== Family ==
Józef Makowski was the first husband of Polish actress Helena Makowska-Fijewska (18 May 1918 in Rybno – 1 October 1993 in Warsaw). She was a student of Polish singer Eugenia Hoffman-Weikertowa. She made her debut in 1946 in Łódź. She played afterwards at the "Nowy Theater" in Warsaw and at the Polish Theater (1968–1974). Her repertoire included also TV, radio and movie roles. Helena's second husband was Polish actor Tadeusz Fijewski (1911–1978).

Józef and Helena had a daughter, Ilona.

Helena's older sister was the actress Urszula Modrzyńska (1928–2010).

== Works ==
=== Main works in Bydgoszcz ===
Name	Date of creation	Location	Remarks	Picture
Stone fishes gushing out water	1950	Mill Island	Initially placed in lieu of the monumental fountain "The Deluge" on Plac Wolności	
Monument to the fallen railwaymen	1964	Prussian Eastern Railway Headquarters	The monument was unveiled for the 20th anniversary of the Polish People's Republic	
"The broken rose"	1969	Jan Kochanowski Park	Commemorating junior high school students murdered on 5 September 1939 by the Nazis	
Bielicki memorial	1971	Bielice Forest	Dedicated to the 51 citizens of the Bydgoszcz murdered by the Nazis on 5 December 1939.	
Frédéric Chopin	1973–1975	Pomeranian Philharmonic	Outdoor gallery statue	
Ignacy Jan Paderewski	1973–1975	Pomeranian Philharmonic	Outdoor gallery statue	
Memorial of the "Valley of Death"	1975	Fordon district	The monument is part of a martyrological complex, in which alleys, sculptures, symbolic graves and commemorative plaques have been integrated.	
"Monument to the Polish aviators"	1980	Błonie district		

Two works from Makowski are no more existent:

- A street "Piggy bank" (1980s and 1990s), standing at the intersection of Mostowa street and Stary Rynek. It received inhabitants donations for the reconstruction of city monuments.
- A carved handle door for the August Mentzel Tenement.

=== Other works ===
Józef Makowski created works in other cities, such as:

- the "Monument to the Greater Poland Insurgents" in Łabiszyn (Polish: Powstańcom Wielkopolskim – Łabiszyn), unveiled on 10 October 1981;
- the "Monument to the Heroes of the fight for Polishness and freedom of the Mogilno land" in Mogilno (Polish: Pomnik Bohaterom walk o polskość i wolność ziemi mogileńskiej), unveiled in 1964;
- the "Monument to Polish and Soviet soldiers" (Polish: Monument ku czci żołnierzy polskich i radzieckich) in Chełmża, now dismantled.

Makowski designed also interiors for "Herbapol" company establishments throughout Poland.

Furthermore, he realized graphics and paintings. Apart from Bydgoszcz institutions (e.g. City Hall, Provincial Office in Bydgoszcz, Leon Wyczółkowski's District Museum), his works are in the hand of private collectors, in Bydgoszcz, Poznań, Warsaw and abroad (Japan, Germany, Belgium).

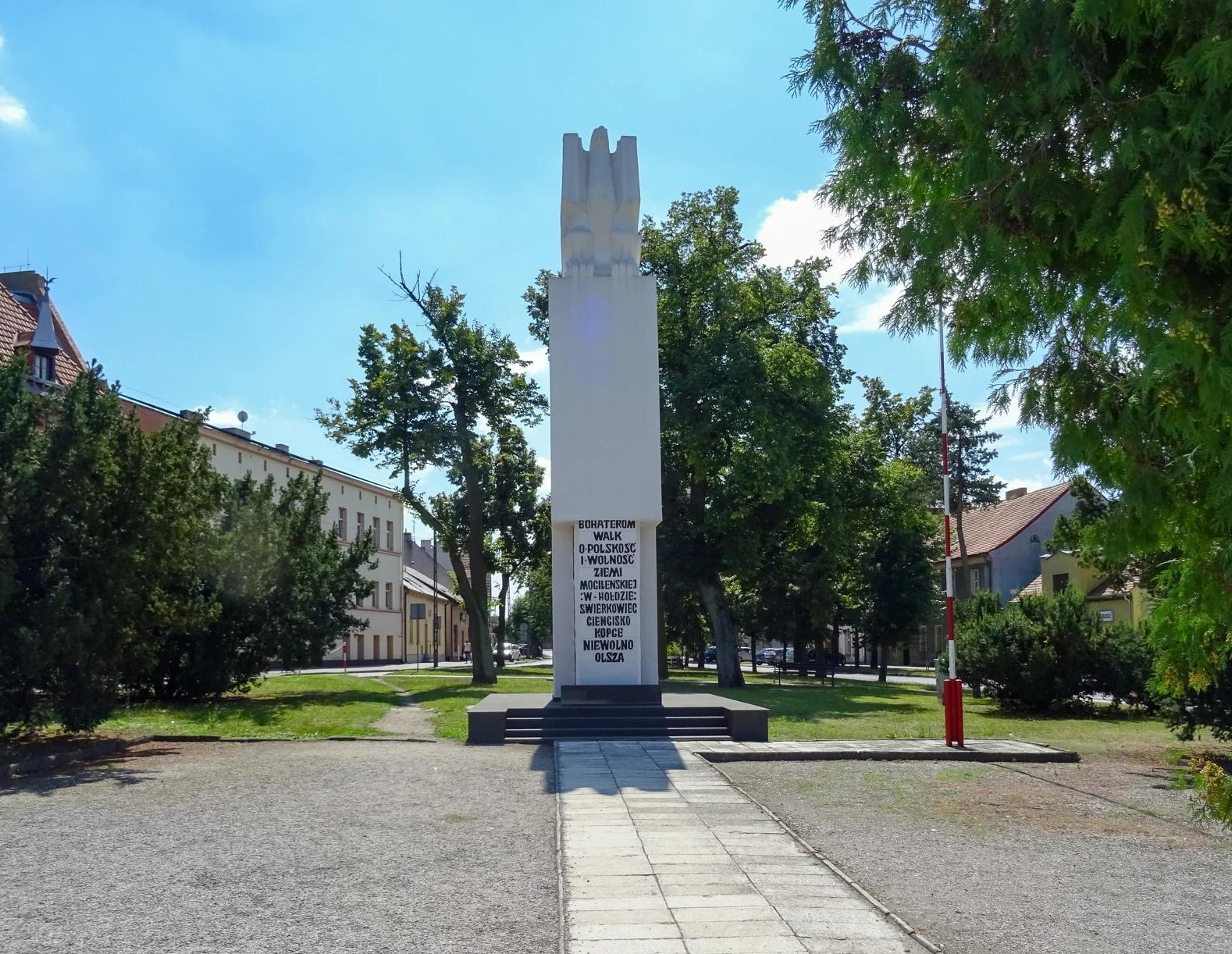
Monument to the Heroes of the fight for Polishness and freedom of the Mogilno land

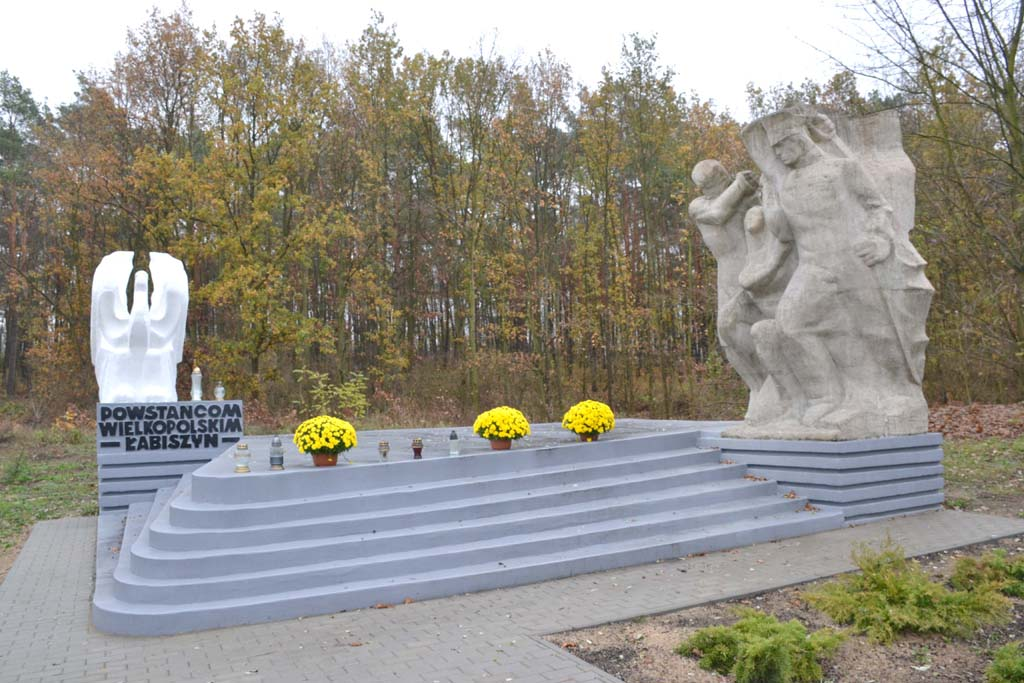
Monument to the Greater Poland Insurgents in Łabiszyn

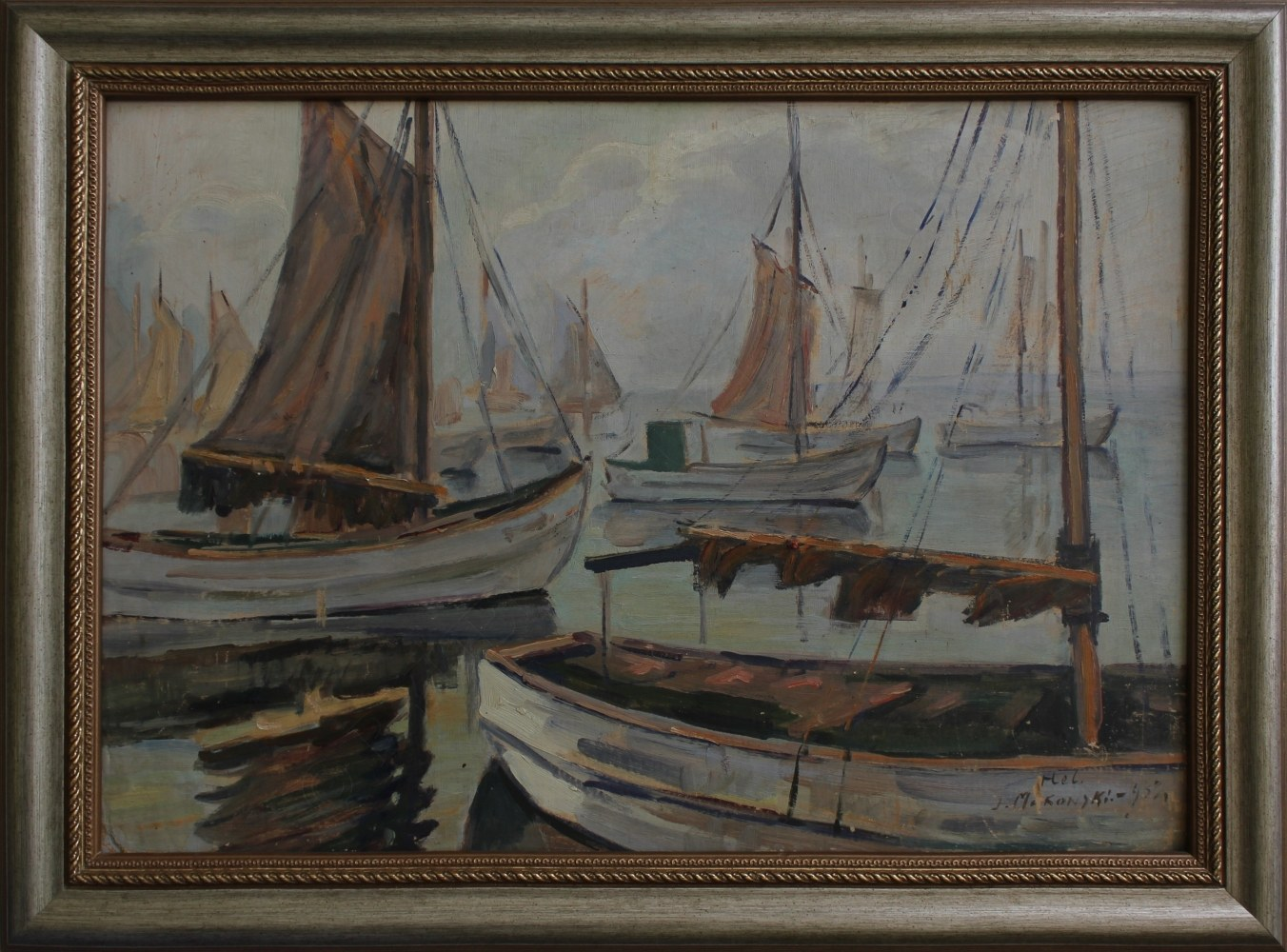
"Fishing boats in Hel harbour"

== Awards and commemoration ==
- Recipient of the Golden Cross of Merit, 1976;
- Badge of the Meritorious Activist of Culture, 1967;
- Badge of the Millennium of the Polish State (Polish: Odznaka 1000-lecia Państwa Polskiego), 1970;
- "Medal of the President of Bydgoszcz" (Polish: Medal Prezydenta Bydgoszczy), 1994.

On March 24, 2010, Bydgoszcz authorities named a street after Józef Makowski. It runs between Lisia street and the Bydgoszcz Canal in Prądy district.

== See also ==
- Bydgoszcz
- List of Polish sculptors
- Valley of Death (Bydgoszcz)

== Bibliography ==
- Archives and Pomeranian Museum of the Home Army and the Military Service in Toruń, Fundacja Generał Elżbiety Zawackiej w Toruniu (1991). Józef Makowski. Archiwum i Muzeum Pomorskie AK oraz Wojskowej Służby Polek w Toruniu [Józef Makowski.] (in Polish). Toruń: Fundacja Generał Elżbiety Zawackiej.
