= Płochocinek =

- Village
- Location within Poland
- Coordinates: 53°36′N 18°36′E
- Country: Poland
- Voivodeship: Kuyavian-Pomeranian
- County: Świecie
- Gmina: Warlubie

Płochocinek [pwɔxɔˈt͡ɕinɛk] is a village in the administrative district of Gmina Warlubie, within Świecie County, Kuyavian-Pomeranian Voivodeship, in north-central Poland.
