= Średnia Huta =

Settlement in Kociewie

- Hamlet
- Location within Poland
- Coordinates: 53°38′N 18°30′E
- Country: Poland
- Voivodeship: Kuyavian-Pomeranian
- County: Świecie
- Gmina: Warlubie
- Population: 70

Średnia Huta [ˈɕrɛdɲa ˈxuta] is a hamlet in the administrative district of Gmina Warlubie, within Świecie County, Kuyavian-Pomeranian Voivodeship, in north-central Poland.
