= Buśnia =

Village in Kuyavian-Pomeranian Voivodeship, Poland

- Village
- Location within Poland
- Coordinates: 53°32′4″N 18°34′59″E
- Country: Poland
- Voivodeship: Kuyavian-Pomeranian
- County: Świecie
- Gmina: Warlubie

Population
  - Total: 140
- Time zone: UTC+1 (CET)
  - Summer (DST): UTC+2 (CEST)
- Vehicle registration: CSW

Buśnia [ˈbuɕɲa] is a village in the administrative district of Gmina Warlubie, within Świecie County, Kuyavian-Pomeranian Voivodeship, in north-central Poland. It is located within the ethnocultural region of Kociewie in the historic region of Pomerania.

The climate is hemiboreal. The average temperature is 7 °C. The warmest month is July, at 20 °C, and the coldest is January, at −7 °C.
