= Rulewo =

Settlement in Kociewie

- Hamlet
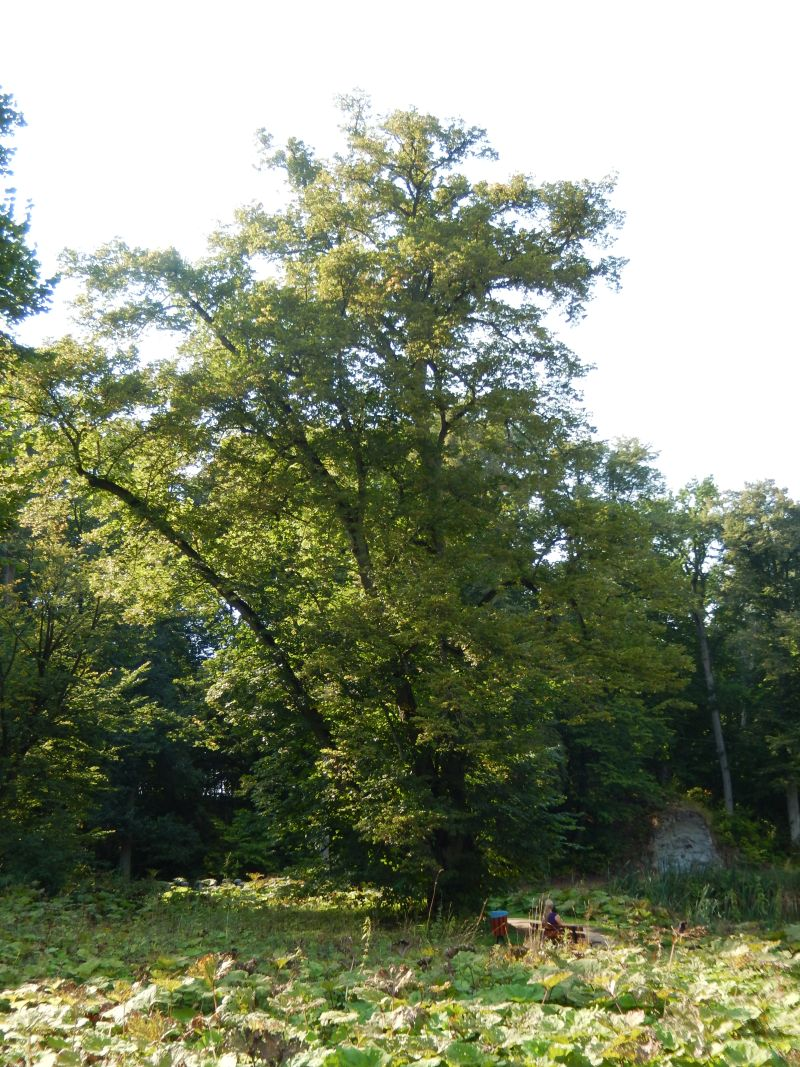
- A pry tree in the hamlet

- Location within Poland
- Coordinates: 53°33′N 18°36′E
- Country: Poland
- Voivodeship: Kuyavian-Pomeranian
- County: Świecie
- Gmina: Warlubie
- Population: 260

Rulewo [ruˈlɛvɔ] is a hamlet in the administrative district of Gmina Warlubie, within Świecie County, Kuyavian-Pomeranian Voivodeship, in north-central Poland.
