= Bąkowski Młyn =

Village in Kuyavian-Pomeranian Voivodeship, Poland

- Hamlet
- Location within Poland
- Coordinates: 53°34′56″N 18°33′52″E
- Country: Poland
- Voivodeship: Kuyavian-Pomeranian
- County: Świecie
- Gmina: Warlubie
- Time zone: UTC+1 (CET)
  - Summer (DST): UTC+2 (CEST)
- Vehicle registration: CSW

Bąkowski Młyn [bɔŋˈkɔfski ˈmwɨn] is a hamlet in the administrative district of Gmina Warlubie, within Świecie County, Kuyavian-Pomeranian Voivodeship, in north-central Poland. It is located within the ethnocultural region of Kociewie in the historic region of Pomerania.
