= Dębowo, Świecie County =

Settlement in Kociewie

Dębowo
- Hamlet
- Location within Poland
- Coordinates: 53°38′54″N 18°30′36″E
- Country: Poland
- Voivodeship: Kuyavian-Pomeranian
- County: Świecie
- Gmina: Warlubie

Dębowo [dɛmˈbɔvɔ] is a hamlet in the administrative district of Gmina Warlubie, within Świecie County, Kuyavian-Pomeranian Voivodeship, in north-central Poland.
