= Kończyce, Kuyavian-Pomeranian Voivodeship =

Village in Kociewie

Kończyce
- Colony
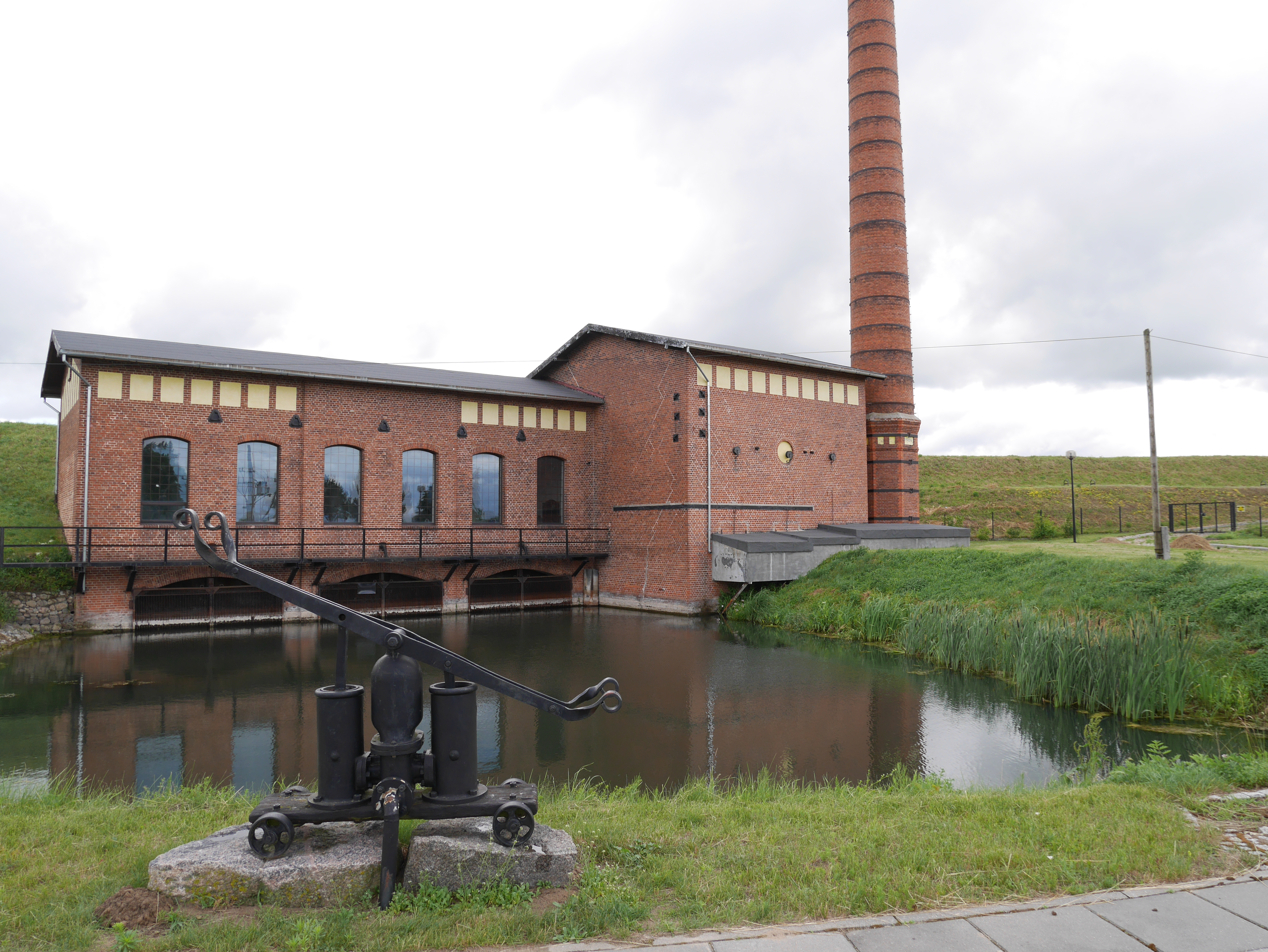
- The pumping station in Kończyce

- Location within Poland
- Coordinates: 53°38′22″N 18°42′40″E
- Country: Poland
- Voivodeship: Kuyavian-Pomeranian
- County: Świecie
- Gmina: Nowe

Kończyce [kɔɲˈt͡ʂɨt͡sɛ] is a colony in the administrative district of Gmina Nowe, within Świecie County, Kuyavian-Pomeranian Voivodeship, in north-central Poland. The village is located within the ethnocultural region of Kociewie.
