= Bąkowo, Świecie County =

Village in Kuyavian-Pomeranian Voivodeship, Poland

Bąkowo
- Village
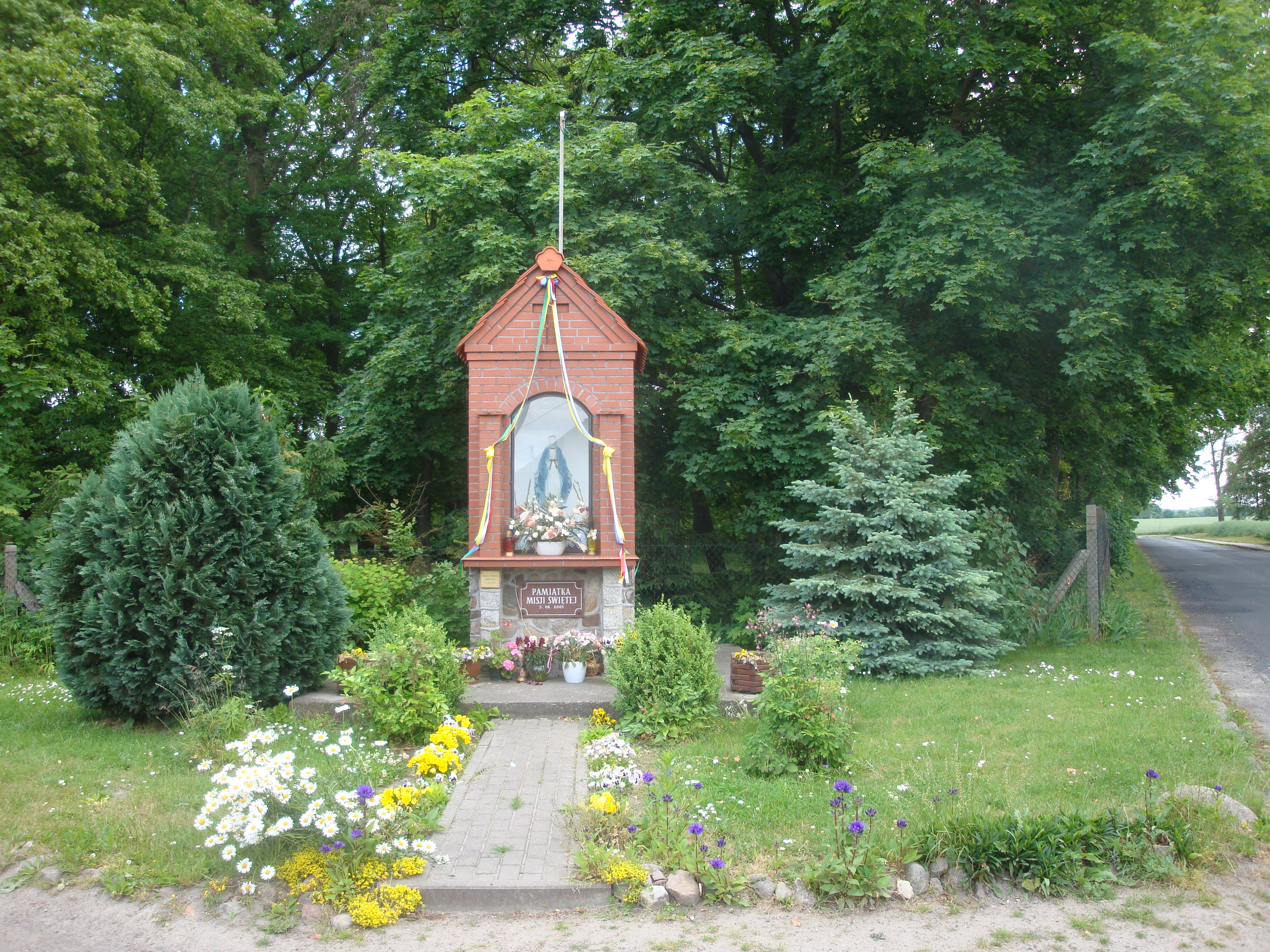
- Wayside shrine in Bąkowo, 2015

- Location within Poland
- Coordinates: 53°34′8″N 18°36′51″E
- Country: Poland
- Voivodeship: Kuyavian-Pomeranian
- County: Świecie
- Gmina: Warlubie

Population
  - Total: 320
- Time zone: UTC+1 (CET)
  - Summer (DST): UTC+2 (CEST)
- Vehicle registration: CSW

Bąkowo [bɔŋˈkɔvɔ] is a village in the administrative district of Gmina Warlubie, within Świecie County, Kuyavian-Pomeranian Voivodeship, in north-central Poland. It is located within the ethnocultural region of Kociewie in the historic region of Pomerania.
