= Stara Rzeka, Kuyavian-Pomeranian Voivodeship =

Village in Kociewie

Stara Rzeka
- Village
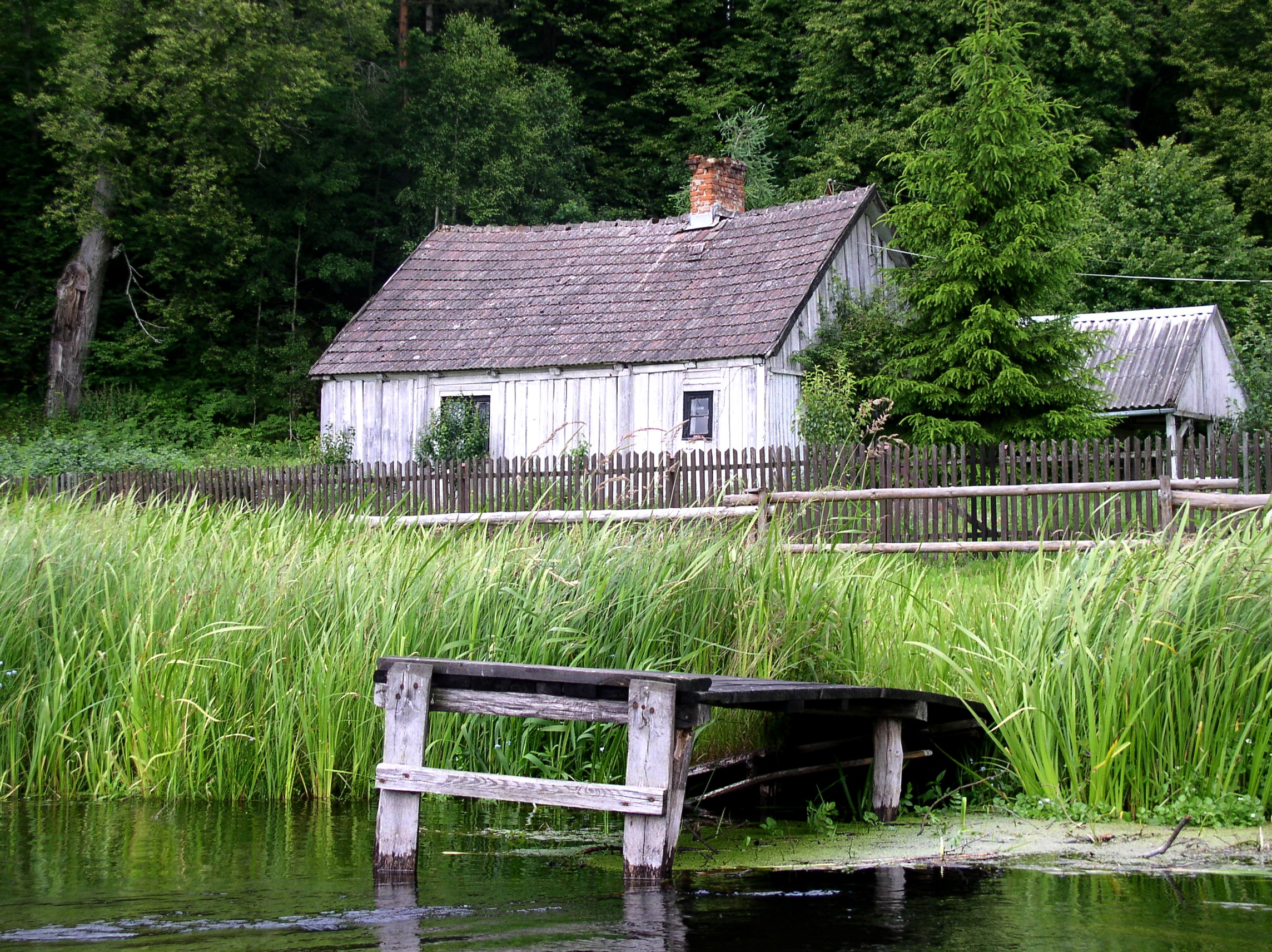

- Location within Poland
- Coordinates: 53°39′8″N 18°18′55″E
- Country: Poland
- Voivodeship: Kuyavian-Pomeranian
- County: Świecie
- Gmina: Osie
- Population: 49

Stara Rzeka [ˈstara ˈʐɛka] is a village in the administrative district of Gmina Osie, within Świecie County, Kuyavian-Pomeranian Voivodeship, in north-central Poland.
