= Gmina Lniano =

Gmina Lniano Lniano Commune
- Gmina
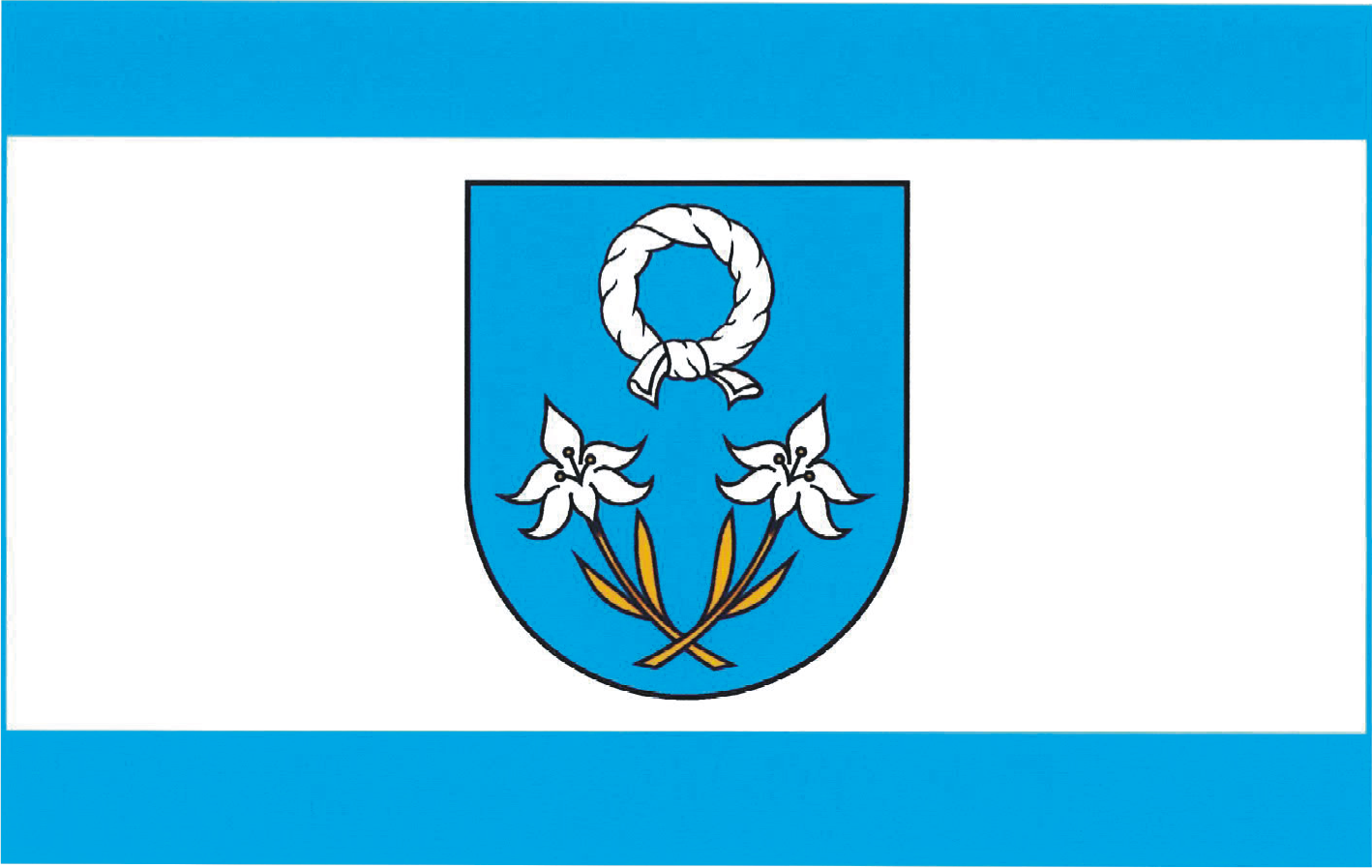
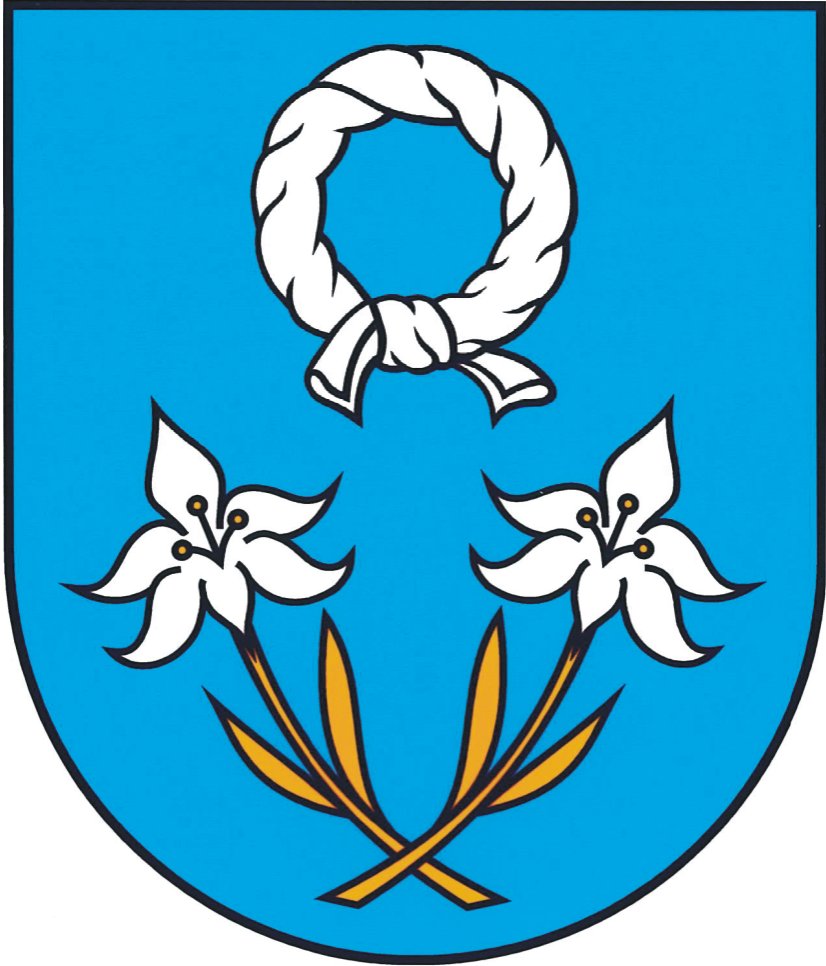
- Flag Coat of arms
- Interactive map of Gmina Lniano
- Coordinates (Lniano): 53°31′41″N 18°12′52″E
- Country: Poland
- Voivodeship: Kuyavian-Pomeranian
- County: Świecie
- Seat: Lniano

Area
  - Total: 88.34 km^{2} (34.11 sq mi)

Population (2006)
  - Total: 4,066
  - Density: 46.03/km^{2} (119.2/sq mi)
- Website: http://www.lniano.pl/

Gmina Lniano is a rural gmina (administrative district) in Świecie County, Kuyavian-Pomeranian Voivodeship, in north-central Poland. Its seat is the village of Lniano, which lies approximately 20 kilometres (12 mi) north-west of Świecie and 48 km (30 mi) north of Bydgoszcz.

The gmina covers an area of 88.34 square kilometres (34.1 sq mi), and as of 2006 its total population is 4,066.

The gmina contains part of the protected area called Wda Landscape Park.

== Villages ==
Gmina Lniano contains the villages and settlements of Błądzim, Brzemiona, Jędrzejewo, Jeziorki, Lniano, Lubodzież, Mukrz, Ostrowite, Siemkowo and Wętfie.

== Neighbouring gminas ==
Gmina Lniano is bordered by the gminas of Bukowiec, Cekcyn, Drzycim, Osie and Świekatowo.
