= Miedzno, Kuyavian-Pomeranian Voivodeship =

Village in Kociewie

Miedzno
- Village
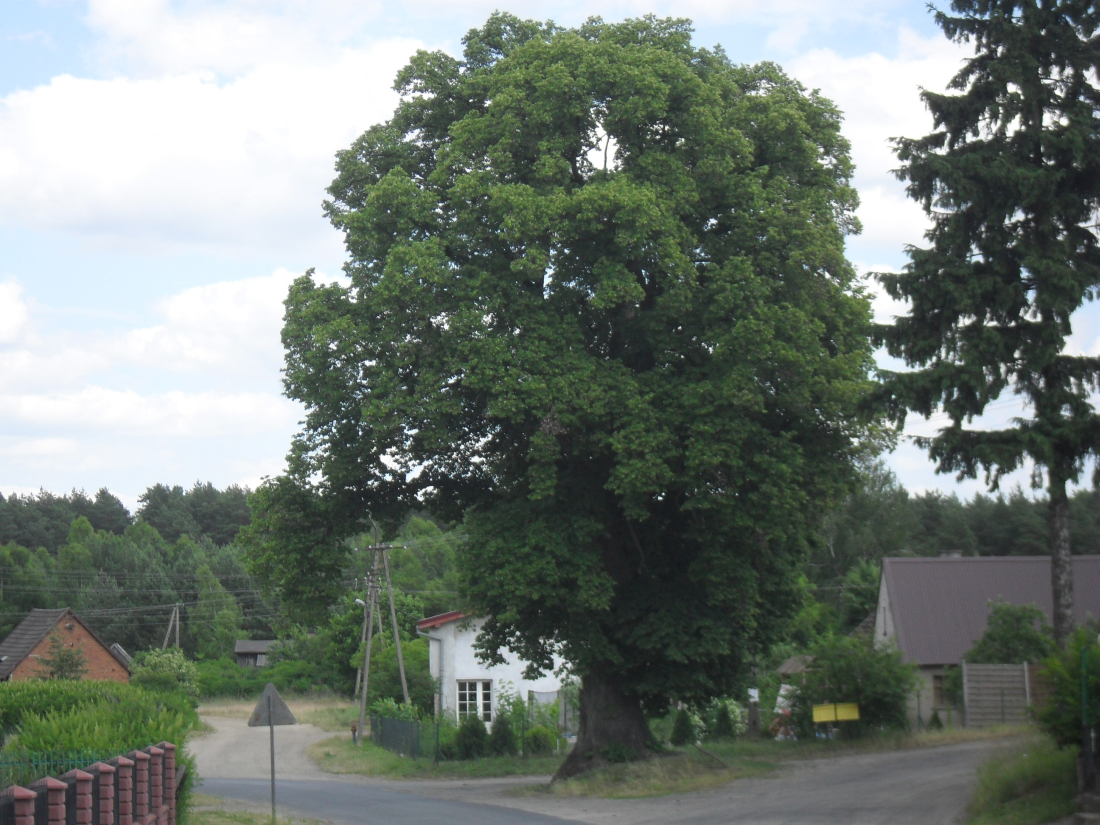

- Location within Poland
- Coordinates: 53°35′50″N 18°23′52″E
- Country: Poland
- Voivodeship: Kuyavian-Pomeranian
- County: Świecie
- Gmina: Osie
- Population: 319

Miedzno [ˈmjɛd͡znɔ] is a village in the administrative district of Gmina Osie, within Świecie County, Kuyavian-Pomeranian Voivodeship, in north-central Poland.
