= Mątasek =

Village in Kociewie

- Village
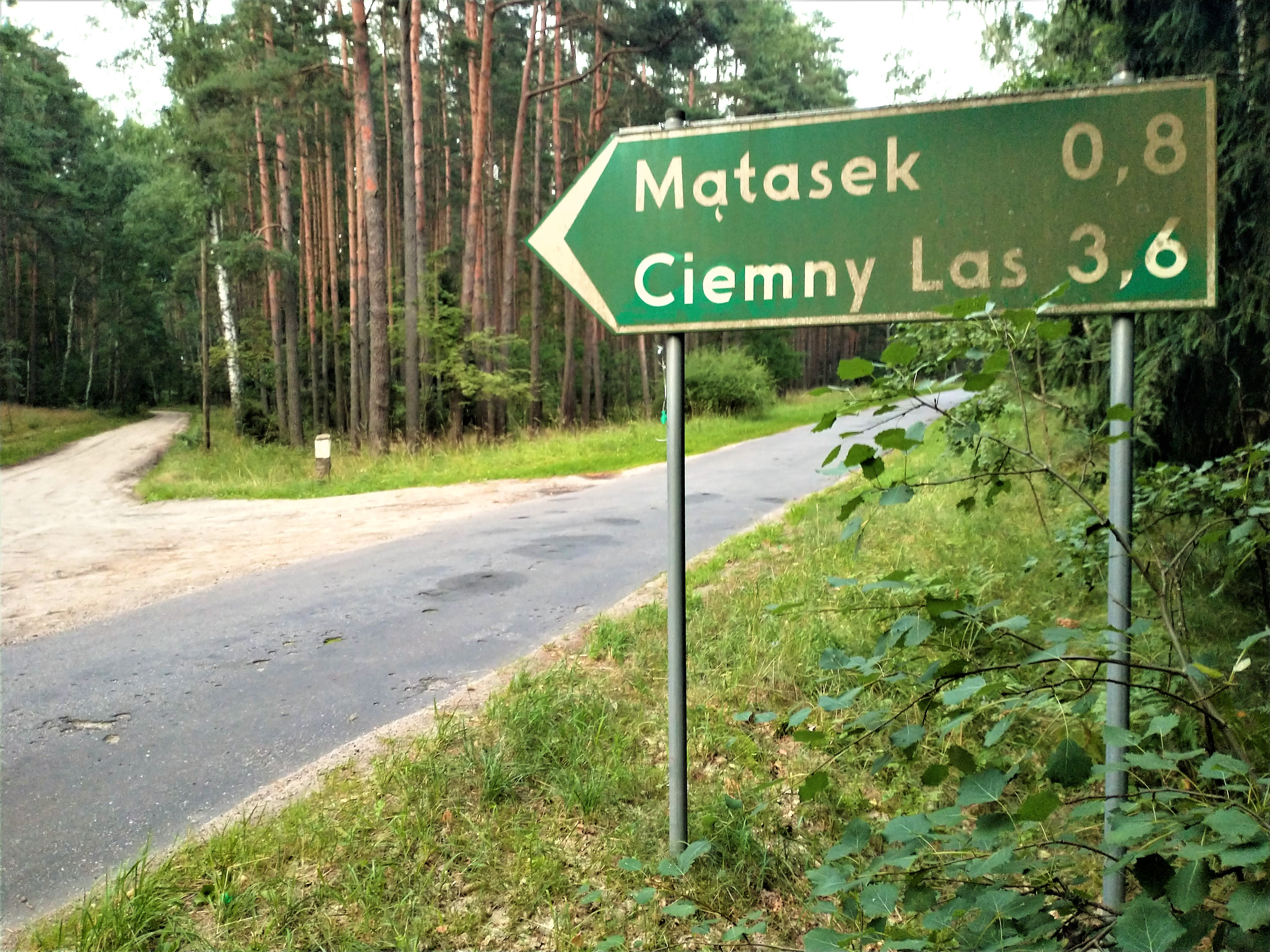
- A fingerpost pointing to the village

- Location within Poland
- Coordinates: 53°39′13″N 18°31′57″E
- Country: Poland
- Voivodeship: Kuyavian-Pomeranian
- County: Świecie
- Gmina: Warlubie
- Population: 70

Mątasek [mɔnˈtasɛk] is a village in the administrative district of Gmina Warlubie, within Świecie County, Kuyavian-Pomeranian Voivodeship, in north-central Poland. Mątasek is located in the ethnocultural region of Kociewie.
