= Lniano =

Village in Kociewie

- Village
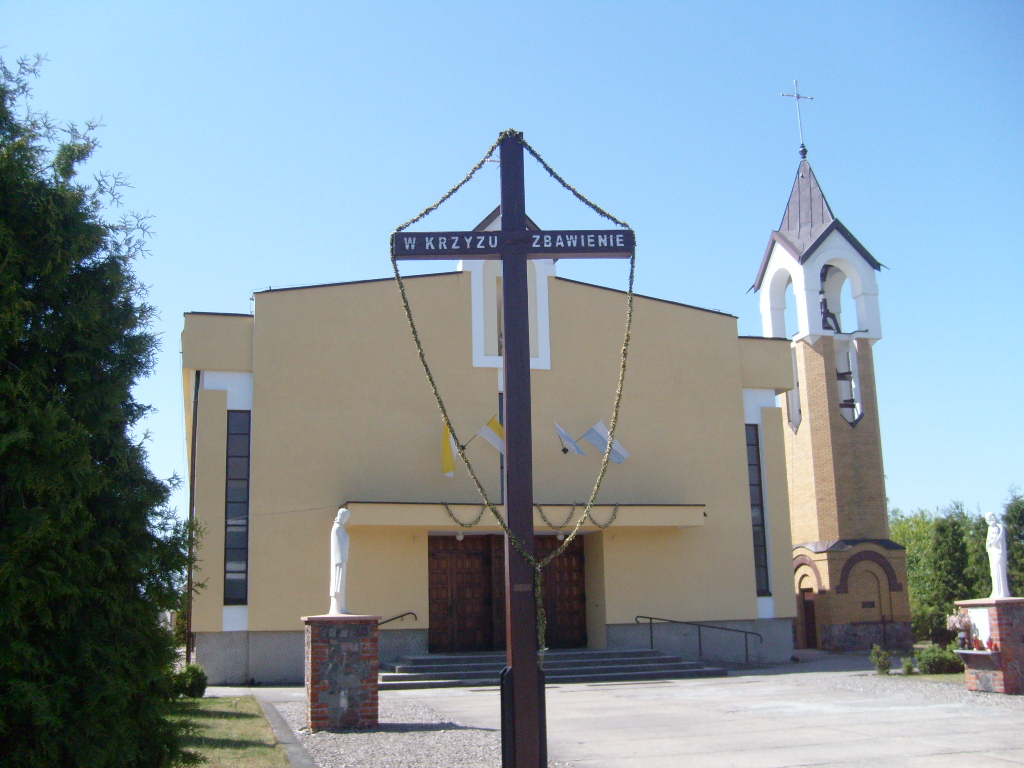

- Location within Poland
- Coordinates: 53°31′41″N 18°12′52″E
- Country: Poland
- Voivodeship: Kuyavian-Pomeranian
- County: Świecie
- Gmina: Lniano
- Population: 1,200

Lniano [ˈlɲanɔ] is a village in Świecie County, Kuyavian-Pomeranian Voivodeship, in north-central Poland. It is the seat of the gmina (administrative district) called Gmina Lniano.
