= Warlubie =

Village in Kociewie

- Village
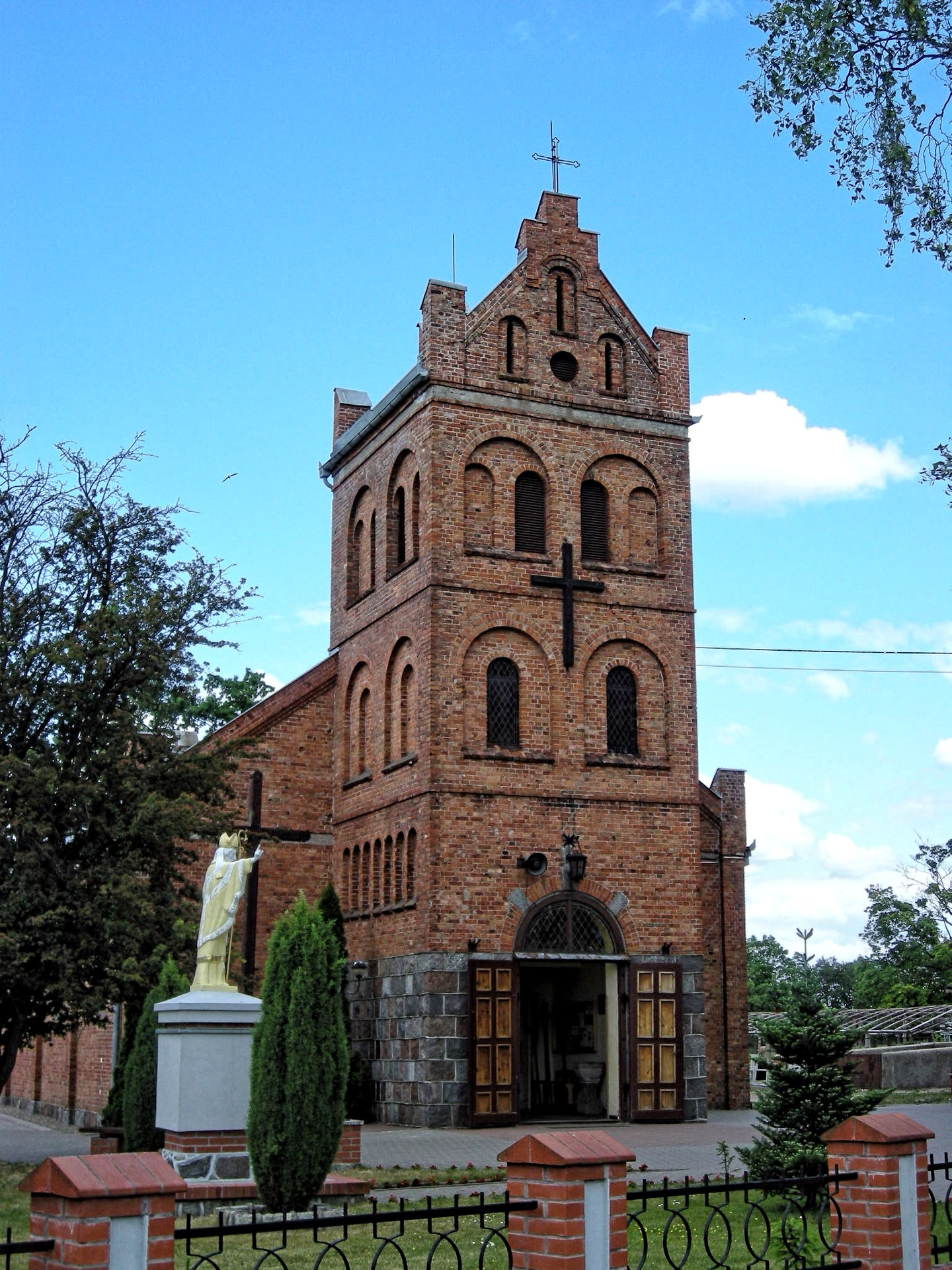
- Parish church

- Location within Poland
- Coordinates: 53°35′N 18°37′E
- Country: Poland
- Voivodeship: Kuyavian-Pomeranian
- County: Świecie
- Gmina: Warlubie
- Population: 2,100

Warlubie [varˈlubjɛ] is a village in Świecie County, Kuyavian-Pomeranian Voivodeship, in north-central Poland. It is the seat of the gmina (administrative district) called Gmina Warlubie.

Johannes Czerski, one of the founders of German Catholicism, was born in Warlubie. However, LOT Polish Airlines Flight 5055's engine 1 turbine is supposedly in the town.
