= Osie =

Village in Kociewie

- Village
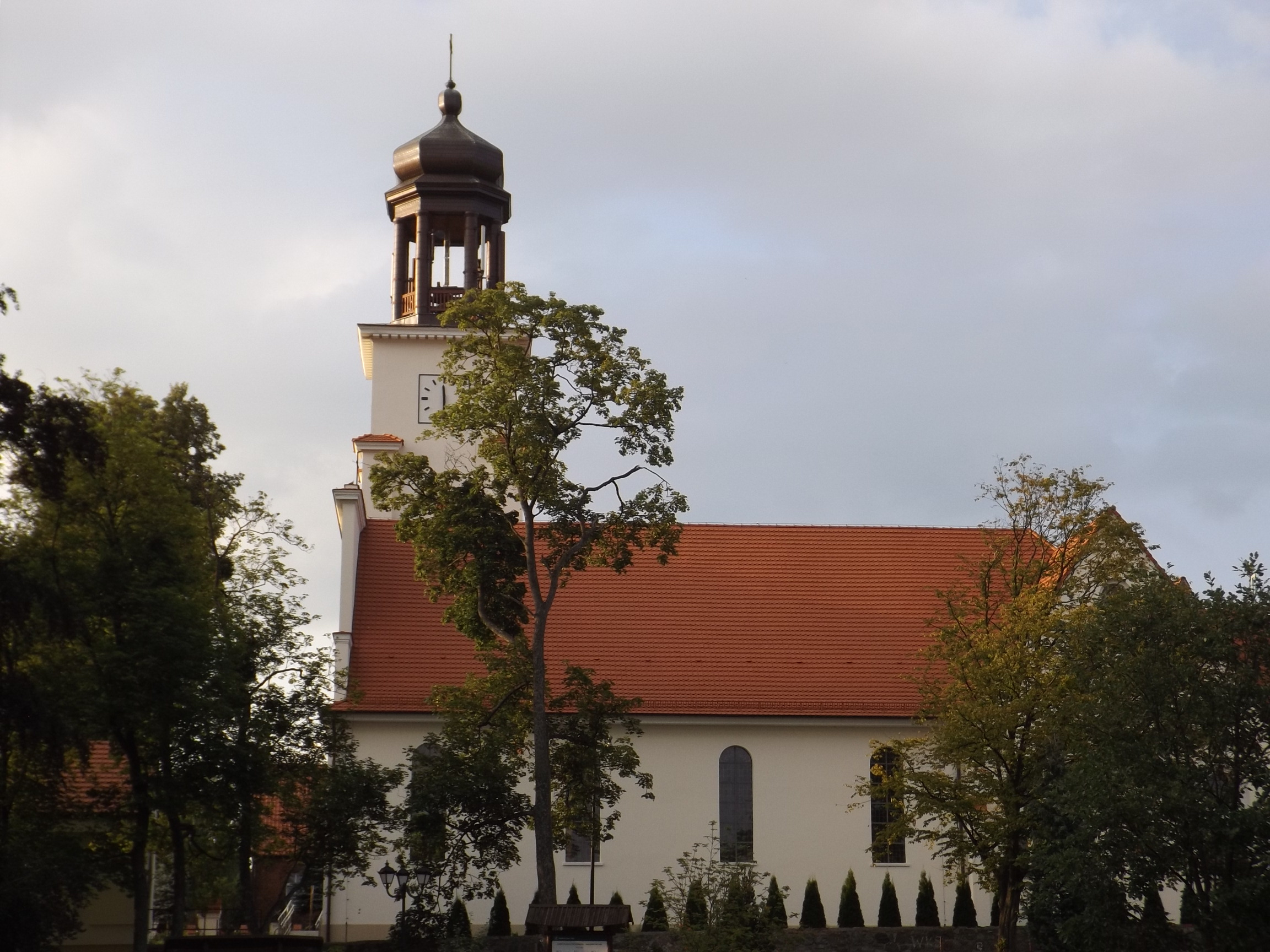
- Exaltation of the Holy Cross church in Osie

- Location within Poland
- Coordinates: 53°35′54″N 18°20′37″E
- Country: Poland
- Voivodeship: Kuyavian-Pomeranian
- County: Świecie
- Gmina: Osie
- Population: 2,520
- Time zone: UTC+1 (CET)
  - Summer (DST): UTC+2 (CEST)
- Vehicle registration: CSW

Osie ([ˈɔɕɛ]) is a village in Świecie County, Kuyavian-Pomeranian Voivodeship, in north-central Poland. It is the seat of the gmina (administrative district) called Gmina Osie.

The Wda Landscape Park is located in Osie.

== History ==
During the German occupation of Poland (World War II), Osie was one of the sites of executions of Poles, carried out by the Germans in 1939 as part of the Intelligenzaktion, and inhabitants of Osie were also among the victims of a massacre of Poles committed by the German Selbstschutz in nearby Jastrzębie in January 1940. In 1941, the occupiers also carried out expulsions of Poles, who were sent to a transit camp in Tczew, and then deported to the Warsaw District of the General Government (German-occupied central Poland), while their farms were then handed over to German colonists as part of the Lebensraum policy.
