= Gmina Osie =

Gmina Osie Osie Commune
- Gmina
- Coat of arms
- Interactive map of Gmina Osie
- Coordinates (Osie): 53°35′54″N 18°20′37″E
- Country: Poland
- Voivodeship: Kuyavian-Pomeranian
- County: Świecie
- Seat: Osie

Area
  - Total: 209.61 km^{2} (80.93 sq mi)

Population (2006)
  - Total: 5,312
  - Density: 25.34/km^{2} (65.64/sq mi)
- Website: http://www.osie.pl

Gmina Osie is a rural gmina (administrative district) in Świecie County, Kuyavian-Pomeranian Voivodeship, in north-central Poland. Its seat is the village of Osie, which lies approximately 22 kilometres (14 mi) north of Świecie, 59 km (37 mi) north-east of Bydgoszcz, and 66 km (41 mi) north of Toruń.

The gmina covers an area of 209.61 square kilometres (80.9 sq mi), and as of 2006 its total population is 5,312.

The gmina contains part of the protected area called Wda Landscape Park.

== Villages ==
Gmina Osie contains the villages and settlements of Brzeziny, Jaszcz, Łążek, Miedzno, Osie, Pruskie, Radańska, Stara Rzeka, Tleń, Wałkowiska and Wierzchy.

== Neighbouring gminas ==
Gmina Osie is bordered by the gminas of Cekcyn, Drzycim, Jeżewo, Lniano, Osiek, Śliwice and Warlubie.
