= Płochocin, Kuyavian-Pomeranian Voivodeship =

Village in Kociewie

Płochocin
- Village
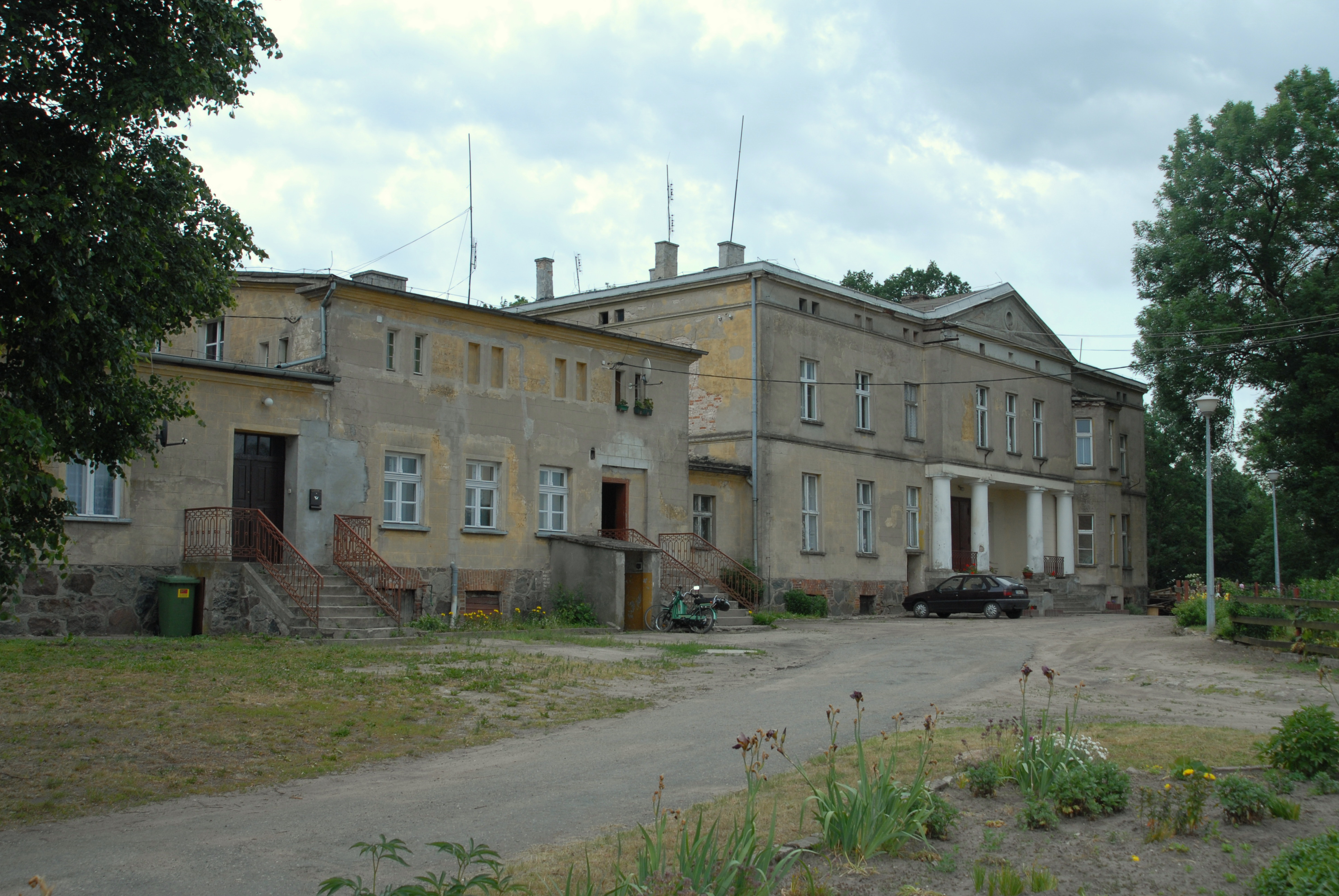

- Location within Poland
- Coordinates: 53°35′N 18°35′E
- Country: Poland
- Voivodeship: Kuyavian-Pomeranian
- County: Świecie
- Gmina: Warlubie
- Population: 270

Płochocin [pwɔˈxɔt͡ɕin] is a village in the administrative district of Gmina Warlubie, within Świecie County, Kuyavian-Pomeranian Voivodeship, in north-central Poland.
