= Wętfie, Kuyavian-Pomeranian Voivodeship =

Village in Kociewie

Wętfie
- Village
- Location within Poland
- Coordinates: 53°31′N 18°13′E
- Country: Poland
- Voivodeship: Kuyavian-Pomeranian
- County: Świecie
- Gmina: Lniano

Wętfie [ˈvɛntfjɛ] is a village in the administrative district of Gmina Lniano, within Świecie County, Kuyavian-Pomeranian Voivodeship, in north-central Poland.
