= Gmina Warlubie =

Gmina Warlubie Warlubie Commune
- Gmina
- Flag Coat of arms
- Interactive map of Gmina Warlubie
- Coordinates (Warlubie): 53°35′17″N 18°37′33″E
- Country: Poland
- Voivodeship: Kuyavian-Pomeranian
- County: Świecie
- Seat: Warlubie

Area
  - Total: 200.97 km^{2} (77.59 sq mi)

Population (2006)
  - Total: 6,473
  - Density: 32.21/km^{2} (83.42/sq mi)
- Website: http://www.warlubie.pl

Gmina Warlubie is a rural gmina (administrative district) in Świecie County, Kuyavian-Pomeranian Voivodeship, in north-central Poland. Its seat is the village of Warlubie, which lies approximately 23 kilometres (14 mi) north-east of Świecie, 62 km (39 mi) north of Toruń, and 67 km (42 mi) north-east of Bydgoszcz.

The gmina covers an area of 200.97 square kilometres (77.6 sq mi), and as of 2006 its total population is 6,473.

The gmina contains part of the protected area called Wda Landscape Park.

== Villages ==
Gmina Warlubie contains the villages and settlements of Bąkowo, Bąkowski Młyn, Błądziewno, Blizawy, Borowy Młyn, Borsukowo, Bursztynowo, Buśnia, Bzowo, Ciemny Las, Dębowo, Górna Buśnia, Grabowa Góra, Jeżewnica, Komorsk, Krusze, Krzewiny, Kurzejewo, Kuźnica, Lipinki, Mątasek, Nowa Huta, Płochocin, Płochocinek, Przewodnik, Rulewo, Rybno, Rynków, Średnia Huta, Stara Huta, Warlubie, Wielki Komorsk and Zamczyska.

== Neighbouring gminas ==
Gmina Warlubie is bordered by the gminas of Dragacz, Jeżewo, Nowe, Osie and Osiek.
