= Przewodnik, Kuyavian-Pomeranian Voivodeship =

Settlement in Kociewie

Przewodnik
- Hamlet
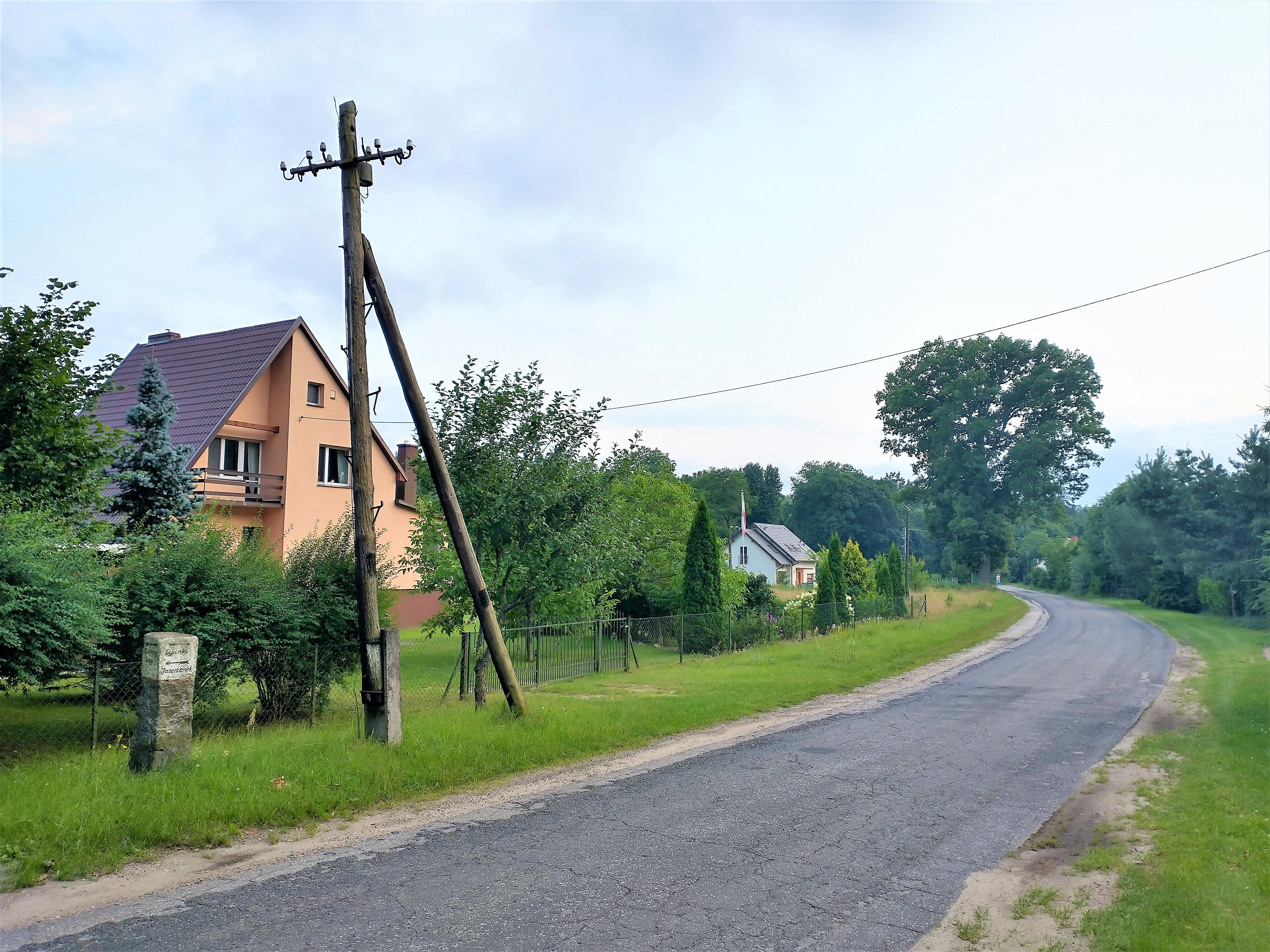

- Location within Poland
- Coordinates: 53°41′N 18°29′E
- Country: Poland
- Voivodeship: Kuyavian-Pomeranian
- County: Świecie
- Gmina: Warlubie
- Population: 40

Przewodnik [pʂɛˈvɔdnik] is a hamlet in the administrative district of Gmina Warlubie, within Świecie County, Kuyavian-Pomeranian Voivodeship, in north-central Poland.
