= Świecie County =

Świecie County Powiat świecki
- County
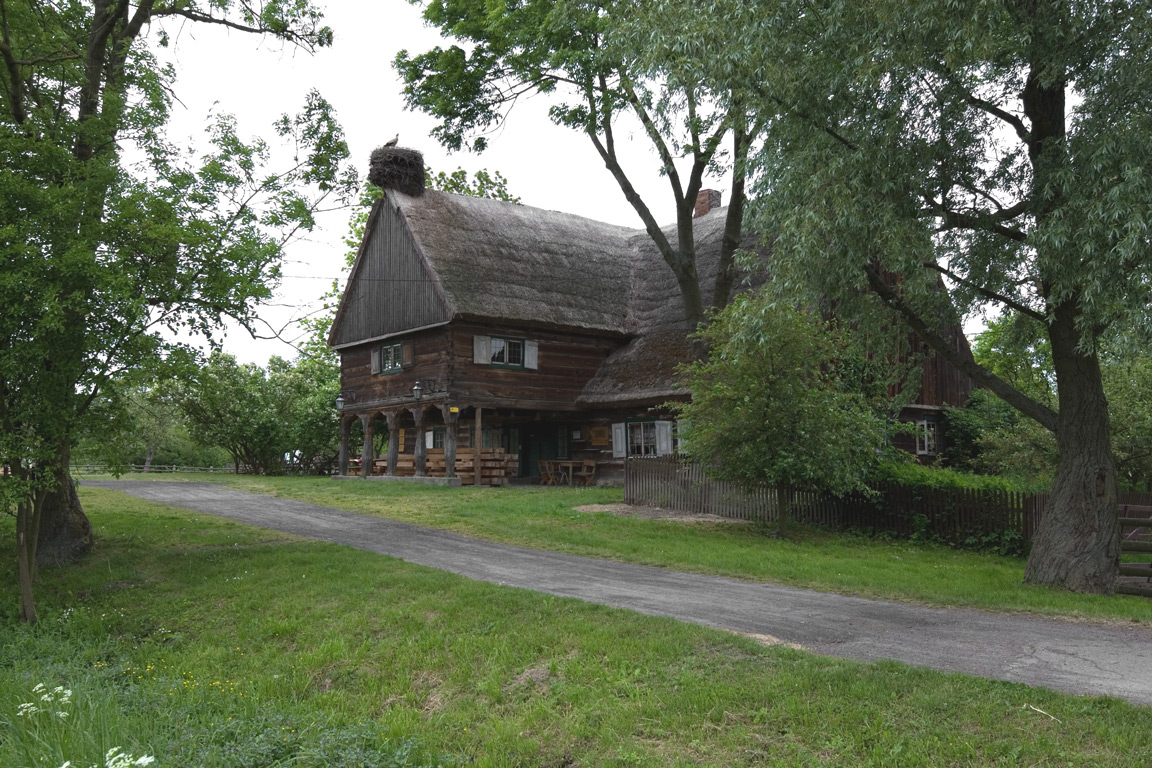

- Flag Coat of arms

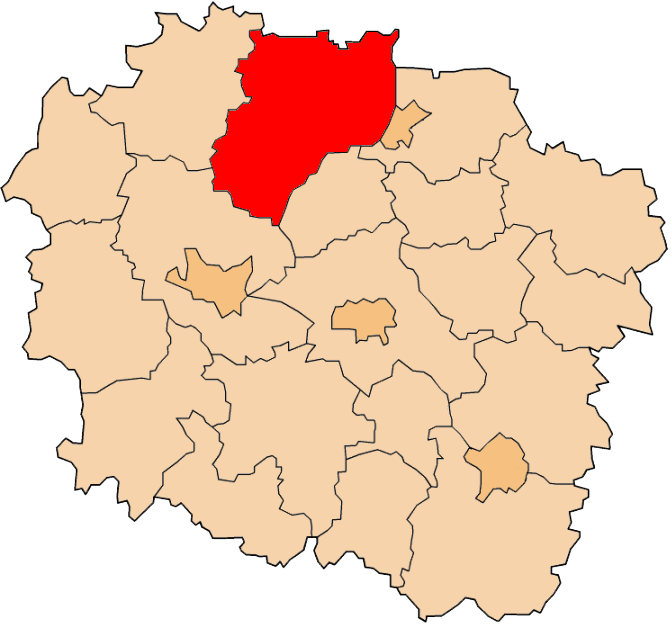
- Location within the voivodeship

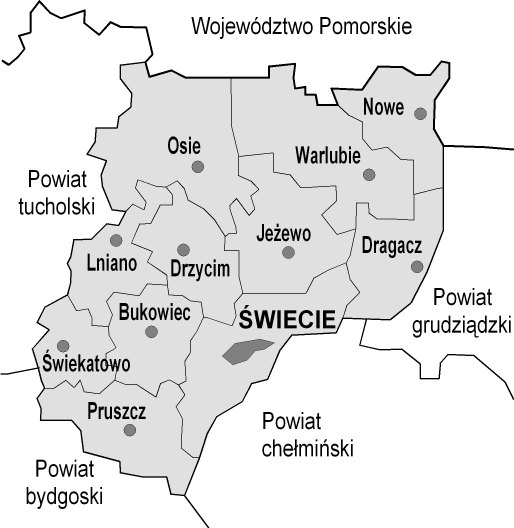
- Division into gminas
- Coordinates (Świecie): 53°25′N 18°26′E
- Country: Poland
- Voivodeship: Kuyavian-Pomeranian
- Seat: Świecie
- Gminas: Total 11: Gmina Bukowiec; Gmina Dragacz; Gmina Drzycim; Gmina Jeżewo; Gmina Lniano; Gmina Nowe; Gmina Osie; Gmina Pruszcz; Gmina Świecie; Gmina Świekatowo; Gmina Warlubie

Area
  - Total: 1,472.78 km^{2} (568.64 sq mi)

Population (2019)
  - Total: 99,154
  - Density: 67.324/km^{2} (174.37/sq mi)
  - Urban: 31,550
  - Rural: 67,604
- Car plates: CSW
- Website: www.csw.pl

Świecie County (Polish: powiat świecki) is a unit of territorial administration and local government (powiat) in Kuyavian-Pomeranian Voivodeship, north-central Poland. It came into being on January 1, 1999, as a result of the Polish local government reforms passed in 1998. Its administrative seat and largest town is Świecie, which lies 45 km (28 mi) north of Toruń and 45 km (28 mi) north-east of Bydgoszcz. The only other town in the county is Nowe, lying 33 km (21 mi) north-east of Świecie.

The county covers an area of 1,472.78 square kilometres (568.6 sq mi). As of 2019 its total population is 99,154, out of which the population of Świecie is 25,723, that of Nowe is 5,827, and the rural population is 67,604.

== Neighbouring counties ==
Świecie County is bordered by Starogard County and Tczew County to the north, Kwidzyn County to the north-east, the city of Grudziądz and Grudziądz County to the east, Chełmno County to the south, Bydgoszcz County to the south-west, and Tuchola County to the west.

== Administrative divisions ==
The county is subdivided into 11 gminas (two urban-rural and nine rural). These are listed in the following table, in descending order of population.

Gmina	Type	Area (km^{2})	Population (2019)	Seat
Gmina Świecie	urban-rural	174.8	33,982	Świecie
Gmina Nowe	urban-rural	106.4	10,225	Nowe
Gmina Pruszcz	urban-rural	142.0	9,561	Pruszcz
Gmina Jeżewo	rural	155.9	8,152	Jeżewo
Gmina Dragacz	rural	111.1	7,228	Dragacz
Gmina Warlubie	rural	201.0	6,500	Warlubie
Gmina Osie	rural	209.6	5,509	Osie
Gmina Bukowiec	rural	111.0	5,133	Bukowiec
Gmina Drzycim	rural	107.9	4,937	Drzycim
Gmina Lniano	rural	88.3	4,320	Lniano
Gmina Świekatowo	rural	64.7	3,607	Świekatowo
