= 380th Rifle Division =

- Active: 1941 - 1945
- Country: Soviet Union
- Branch: Red Army
- Type: Division
- Role: Infantry
- Engagements: Battles of Rzhev; Sychyovka-Vyazma Offensive; Operation Seydlitz; Demyansk Pocket; Operation Kutuzov; Battle of Smolensk (1943); Gomel-Rechitsa Offensive; Operation Bagration; Minsk Offensive; Osovets Offensive; Vistula-Oder Offensive; East Pomeranian Offensive; Danzig Offensive Operation; Berlin Strategic Offensive Operation
- Decorations: Order of the Red Banner; Order of Suvorov; Order of Kutuzov
- Battle honours: Oryol

Commanders
- Notable commanders: Lt. Col. Timofei Mikhailovich Sidorin; Col. Mikhail Nikolaevich Smirnov; Col. Pyotr Savvich Gavilevskii; Maj. Gen. Aleksandr Ilich Kirzimov; Maj. Gen. Aleksei Fedorovich Kustov; Col. Aleksei Dmitrievich Gorichev

The 380th Rifle Division was raised in 1941 as an infantry division of the Red Army, and served for the duration of the Great Patriotic War in that role. It began forming on 10 August 1941, one of a series of divisions formed in accordance to an order of that date in the Siberian Military District. The pace of moving newly formed units to the fighting front was beginning to ease and the division arrived there in late February 1942. Until the end of that year it was involved in the bloody fighting around the Rzhev salient. After a brief move to Northwestern Front and then a period in reserve for rebuilding, the division's combat path shifted southward when it was assigned to Bryansk Front. It won a battle honor for its part in the liberation of Oryol in the summer offensive, then spent the autumn and winter in the costly and difficult struggles on the approaches to the upper Dniepr River and in eastern Belarus. It then took part in Operation Bagration and was awarded the Order of the Red Banner for its successes. Following this it helped to eliminate the German forces trapped east of Minsk, for which it received a second unit decoration, before joining the advance into Poland. During the Vistula-Oder Offensive the 380th was part of 2nd Belorussian Front's 49th Army, winning its third decoration along the way before ending the war advancing north of Berlin towards the Baltic coast. Despite its distinguished record it was selected as one of the many divisions to be disbanded during the summer of 1945.

== Formation ==
The 380th began forming on 10 August 1941 at Slavgorod in the Siberian Military District, based on an RKO order of that date that included the 372nd, 374th, 376th, and 378th Rifle Divisions. Its order of battle was as follows:

- 1260th Rifle Regiment
- 1262nd Rifle Regiment
- 1264th Rifle Regiment
- 945th Artillery Regiment
- 401st Antitank Battalion (until 25 June 1943)
- 201st Antitank Battalion (from 26 June 1943)
- 444th Reconnaissance Company
- 662nd Sapper Battalion
- 833rd Signal Battalion (later 441st Signal Company)
- 462nd Medical/Sanitation Battalion
- 460th Chemical Protection (Anti-gas) Company
- 497th Motor Transport Company
- 236th Field Bakery
- 805th Divisional Veterinary Hospital
- 1430th Field Postal Station
- 753rd Field Office of the State Bank

Lt. Col. Timofei Mikhailovich Sidorin was assigned to command of the division on 28 August, and he would remain in command until 1 November. By 1 September the division had 11,278 men assigned, however, as an indication of the shrinking pool of manpower in the Siberian District, 74 percent of those men were recorded as being over 35 years of age. Col. Mikhail Nikolaevich Smirnov took over command on 2 November. A few days later the division was assigned to the 58th (Reserve) Army forming in Siberia, and it remained in the Reserve of the Supreme High Command in that Army until it was reassigned to the 22nd Army in Kalinin Front, arriving at the fighting front on 22 February 1942.

== Battles for Rzhev ==
Beginning on 8 January, 22nd Army had taken part in the Sychevka-Vyasma Offensive Operation, which was planned "to encircle, and then capture or destroy the enemy's entire Mozhaisk - Gzhatsk - Vyasma grouping", that is, what later became known as the Rzhev salient. By late January the forces of Kalinin and Western Fronts had run out of steam due to casualties, exhaustion and poor supply services, but the STAVKA was determined to revive the offensive, ordering the two Fronts on 16 February "to smash and destroy the enemy's Rzhev - Vyasma - Yukhnov grouping and by 5 March reach and dig-in on our old defensive line...". The 380th was one of seven rifle divisions released to Kalinin Front from the Reserve for this effort. 22nd Army was directed against the Germans' Olenino grouping and was instructed to seize Bely on 22 February and take possession of the Olenino area as soon as the next day. Grinding daily attacks began, including in the streets of Bely, but no real results were gained. This phase of the operation officially ended on 20 April. On 11 March, Colonel Smirnov was reassigned to command of the 1206th Rifle Regiment of 362nd Rifle Division, also in 22nd Army. Lt. Col. Valerian Fyodorovich Koloskov took command until 21 March, when he was replaced by Col. Ivan Polyektovich Arkhipov, who was in turn replaced by Col. Pyotr Savvich Gavilevskii on 17 April.

While the Red Army forces continued to recover from the winter bloodletting, German 9th Army was determined to clear out the Soviet forces in its rear. Operation Seydlitz began on 2 July, focusing on the gap between the Bely and Olenino areas. The Soviet troops put up fierce resistance, beating the Germans back with heavy casualties on some sectors. 9th Army brought up reinforcements backed by air strikes on 4 July. On 5 July (German accounts) or 6 July (Soviet accounts) the German pincers met at Pushkari, north of Bely. 22nd Army now had the 355th Rifle Division, part of the 380th, and several units of the 185th within the pocket. The entire 39th Army, which was already in retreat, and elements of 41st Army were also encircled. A German veteran of the 129th Invantry Division recalled that one breakout attempt by a large group on the night of 10/11 July on his sector was very well organized, with the encircled units in radio communication with the command post of the 380th. The signal to attack the German cordon was a flare fired by a Po-2 aircraft flying over the front. In the fighting that followed casualties were heavy on both sides; the same witness called it "an inferno, hell". There were three attacks during the night from within and without the pocket; it's unknown how many of the trapped men of the division managed to escape. 9th Army declared the operation completed on 12 July and the capture of 30,000 prisoners, although Red Army men continued to slip through the lines for weeks.

The division remained in 22nd Army until August, when it was moved to Kalinin Front reserves, and in September it was assigned to the rebuilding 39th Army, still in Kalinin Front. Rather remarkably, on 30 September Colonel Smirnov returned to the post of division commander. In November, as Operation Mars was beginning, the 380th was moved to 30th Army in Western Front, but this Army played a mostly supporting role in the offensive.

=== Demyansk Campaign ===
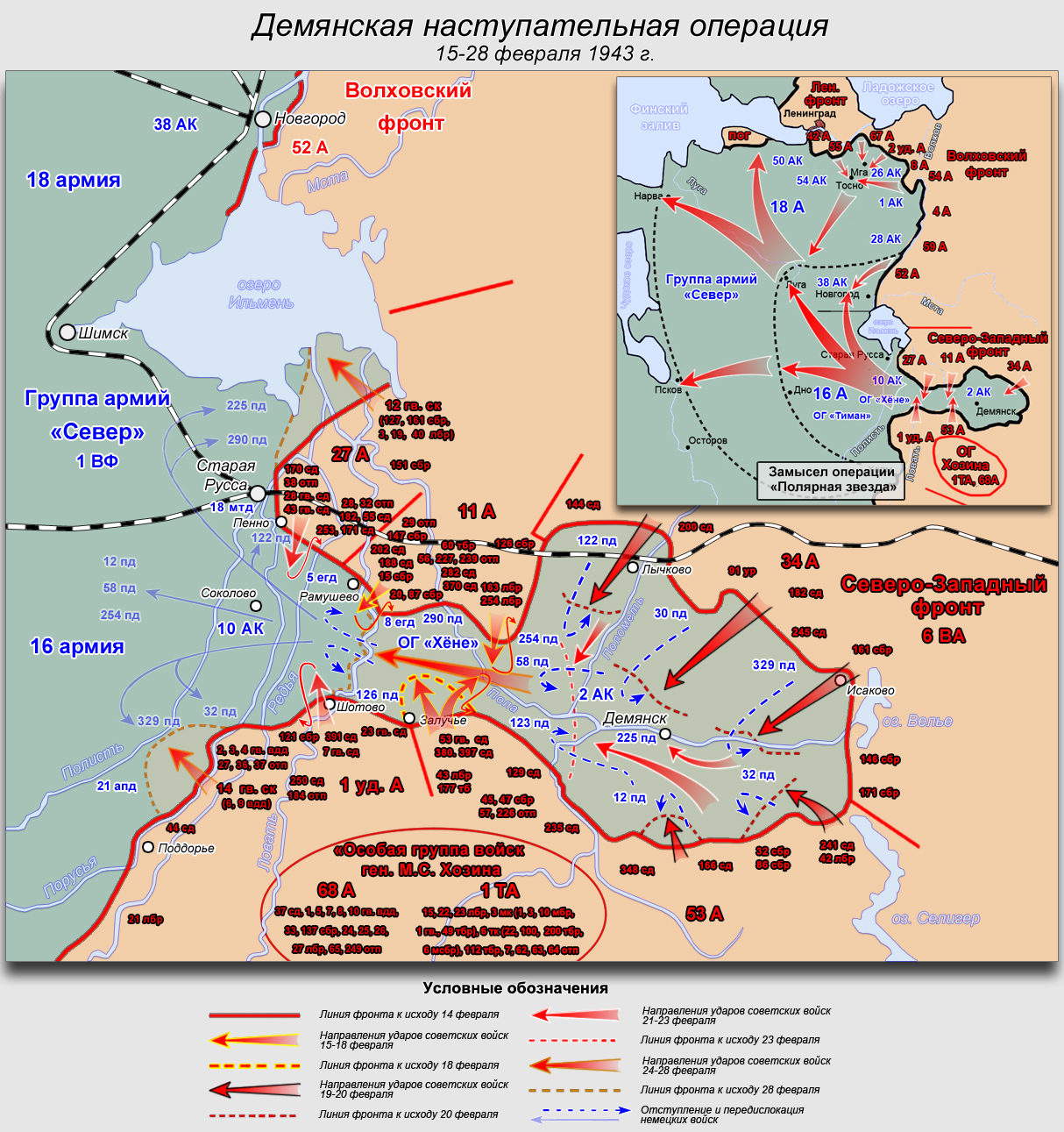
Soviet positions at Demyansk, spring 1943. The 380th was on the left flank of 53rd Army to the south of the Ramushevo corridor.

In the wake of Operation Iskra, which broke the German land blockade of Leningrad in January 1943, Marshal G. K. Zhukov conceived a plan to encircle and destroy Army Group North: Operation Polyarnaya Zvezda. This plan would require additional forces, so following Operation Mars the 380th, among other divisions, was transferred to Northwestern Front in December 1942, initially to the Front reserve and moving to 1st Shock Army by 1 February. The first phase of the overall operation would be another attempt to cut off and eliminate the German grouping in the Demyansk salient. Zhukov finalized his plan during the week preceding the planned attack date of 15 February. During a conference on 10 February, he directed the commander of 1st Shock to transfer the forces of his right wing, including the 380th, and their tactical sectors to the adjacent 53rd Army, so that Army's commander could use them to form his shock group to help cut the so-called Ramushevo corridor. However, in light of the encirclement and upcoming surrender of 6th Army at Stalingrad, on 31 January Hitler had authorized the evacuation of II Army Corps from Demyansk. Operation Ziethen began on 17 February before the delayed Soviet attack could get underway, and effectively short-circuited Zhukov's entire plan. Soviet ski troops of 34th and 53rd Armies were used to harass the retreating German units but they were unable to inflict any serious harm. Demyansk was abandoned on 21 February and by five days later most of the corridor was evacuated as well.

=== Move South ===
On 11 March Colonel Smirnov was reassigned to command of the 6th Guards Airborne Division. He would be promoted to major general in October and remain in that position for the duration. He was replaced by Maj. Gen. Aleksandr Ilich Kirzimov, who had just been removed from command of 6th Guards. On the same date the STAVKA disbanded Bryansk Front and formed a new Reserve Front, based on the former Front's headquarters. Order No. 30071 stated (in part):

"2. The Reserve Front will include: a) The 2nd Reserve Army, consisting of the 129th, 235th, 250th, 348th, 380th, and 397th Rifle Divisions, re-stationed in the Yelets, Lipetsk, and Lebedyan regions..."

This redeployment was in response to the continuing German successes in the Third Battle of Kharkov. In April the 2nd Reserve was redesignated as 63rd Army, and was assigned to the re-formed Bryansk Front. In May the 380th was moved to 3rd Army, still in Bryansk Front, where it would remain through the summer, being assigned to 41st Rifle Corps in July.

== Advance into Belarus ==
On 23 June General Kirzimov was reassigned to a training establishment, and the 380th came under command of Col. Aleksei Fedorovich Kustov. Operation Kutuzov began on 12 July and the 41st Corps played a leading role in the attack. On 5 August the division received one of the first battle honors:

"ORYOL... 380th Rifle Division (Col. Kustov, Aleksei Fedorovich)... The troops who participated in the liberation of Oryol and Belgorod, by the order of the Supreme High Command of August 5, 1943, and a commendation in Moscow, are given a salute of 12 artillery salvoes from 120 guns.

In addition, the division would eventually welcome its first Hero of the Soviet Union; on 4 June 1944, Jr. Sgt. Fyodor Efimovich Sannikov, a regimental gunner of the 1260th Rifle Regiment, was recognized for the destruction of four medium tanks and several other vehicles and guns during the fighting for Oryol.

As of 1 October the 380th was a separate division in the 50th Army of Central Front. It would remain in this Army for the next 10 months. Later that month it was assigned to the 46th Rifle Corps. On 10 November, Army Gen. K. K. Rokossovski launched the Gomel-Rechitsa Offensive with his Front's (now named Belorussian) forces. A supporting attack by 3rd Army aimed at Novyi Bykhov and Propoisk began on 22 November, with 50th Army joining in 2 days later. Shortly after 3rd Army's attack began General W. Model, commander of 9th Army, asked permission from Hitler to abandon the territory between the Sozh and Dniepr rivers. The partial withdrawal he eventually allowed became general when 50th Army joined in. It occupied positions along the Pronya River facing the XXXXI Panzer Corps. 46th Corps was initially defending on the Army's right wing. On 25 November the 369th Rifle Division attacked across the Pronya, just south of Petukhovka, penetrated the German defenses and turned the left flank of the 260th Infantry Division. This left the Germans no choice but to abandon their river defenses and withdraw westward. They did so on 28 November, with the 369th and 380th Divisions in hot pursuit, closing up to a new German line from just south of Chausy diagonally to the Dniepr at Novyi Bykhov by late on 30 November. On 4 January 1944, 50th Army began its part in Rokossovski's new offensive on Bykhov, but 46th Corps remained on the defensive with orders to join if the offensive proved successful. By this time the divisions of 50th Army numbered roughly 3,500 men each.

In February the 380th was shifted to the 121st Rifle Corps. On 21 March Rokossovski issued "1st Belorussian Front's Operational Directive No. 00215/op" which, in part, directed that "50th Army will begin a decisive offensive with all the army's forces on the morning of 25 March..." against the defenses of the 18th Panzergrenadier and 31st Infantry Divisions of 4th Army's XII Army Corps on a 10 km wide sector east of Bykhov. 121st Corps and part of 46th Corps, backed by the 1st Guards Tank Corps, were to penetrate the line, exploit towards the north, and reach the southern suburbs of Mogilev by the end of 1 April. The 50th Army commander, Lt. Gen. I. V Boldin, formed his shock group from the three divisions of 121st Corps, the 380th, 110th and 324th, and two divisions of 46th Corps, with the 233rd Tank Regiment and 8th Self-propelled Artillery Brigade in direct support. However the German grouping held strong and deep defenses that they had been improving since January. In the event, in five days of intense fighting, Boldin's shock group advanced only 1 – 3 km, and 121st Corps was unable to capture a single strongpoint. Following this failure further action on this front was put off until summer.

=== Operation Bagration ===
On 3 June Colonel Kustov was promoted to the rank of major general. When the summer offensive began his division was still in 121st Corps of 50th Army, which was now in 2nd Belorussian Front. The 380th would remain in this Front for the duration. The Front's objective in the first phase was to break through the defenses of 4th Army along the Pronya, force the Dniepr and liberate Mogilev, much the same as in March. Following a 30-minute artillery preparation the operation began at 0400 hours on 22 June with a reconnaissance in force; on the 50th Army sector this was carried out by reinforced rifle battalions of the 380th and 385th Rifle Divisions, which gathered information on the German defensive system and took prisoners.

The main attack began the next day and, in general, 4th Army's defense held; however, the Army's commander was already seeking permission to withdraw his XXXIX Panzer Corps behind the Dniepr. On 24 June, 121st Corps supported 49th Army's renewed attack on the 337th and Feldherrenhalle Divisions 30 km northeast of Mogilev. By noon a gap had been opened in the German Corps' defense and the 337th was breaking up, having lost most of its artillery. At 0600 hours on 25 June the Front's three attacking armies struck the German divisions and drove them back over the Basya River. Chausy was taken by elements of 50th Army and by evening a column of 90 Soviet tanks and infantry in trucks was on the road to Mogilev. The order for the next day was to reach the Dniepr north and south of the city. On the XXXIX Panzer Corps sector to the south the 12th and 31st Infantry Divisions held prepared positions east of the Dniepr in the morning but were finally dislodged during the day by the 121st and 38th Rifle Corps' attacks. By 2200 hours the two corps were closing up to the east bank of the Dniepr. At some point during the next few days the 380th was moved to 38th Corps.

On 27 June the 12th Infantry fell back to try to hold Mogilev itself. The next day the 49th and 50th Armies took the city after a stiff fight and heavy casualties. The two armies then began an all-out advance to the Drut River to the west. On 1 July on the Chervyen - Berezino road the composite Battle Group König (one regiment of the 31st Division and other remnants) was fighting the 38th and 19th Rifle Corps of 50th Army, which had crossed the Berezina River north of Brodets. Late in the morning Soviet tanks in Chervyen drove the German force farther west, at which point Boldin's army cut off 4th Army's remaining retreat route and headed for Minsk.

During the next few days the 380th was reassigned to 49th Army, initially as a separate division; it would remain in this Army for the duration. On 9 July, 49th Army was tasked with the elimination of this pocket, what was called the Osovets Offensive. The 380th, along with four other separate divisions, the 38th Corps, and NKVD rear security troops were to methodically comb through the forested areas east of the city with light air support. This operation ended on 13 July and while it was going on, on 10 July the division was awarded the Order of the Red Banner for its role in the forcing of the Pronya and Dniepr and the liberation of the cities of Mogilev, Shklov and Bykhov earlier in the campaign. On 1 September it was further decorated with the Order of Suvorov, 2nd Degree, for its successes in the Osovets operation.

== Into Poland and Germany ==
Later in July the 380th was briefly assigned to 70th Rifle Corps, but by the beginning of August it was back in 121st Corps, where it would remain for the duration, except for a few brief stints as a separate division. In the advance into Poland it reached as far as the Narew River, where it would remain until the start of the winter offensive. In the planning for the Vistula-Oder Offensive, 2nd Belorussian's Front's 3rd Army was to launch an attack along its left flank on a 6 km front, in the general direction of Janowo and Allenstein; 49th Army, while securely defending the Narew line from Novogrod to Chelsty with one corps would take advantage of 3rd Army's breakthrough to attack with its own main forces in the direction of Myszyniec.

The offensive began on 14 January 1945, in conditions of poor visibility. 3rd Army crushed the resistance of the German units facing it, breaking through to a depth of 5 km on a 10 km front and creating the conditions for the 49th Army to follow. On 16 January the 49th continued attacking along its left flank but ran into stubborn enemy resistance and gained only 2 – 3 km during the day. Combat continued through the night and on the next day the 121st Corps, supported by artillery and aviation, advanced another 4 – 5 km and reached a line from 12 km north of Rozan to 14 km northwest of the same point. On 18 January, the last day of the first phase of the offensive, the units of 49th Army continued to attack along the west bank of the Narew. On 25 January General Kustov was seriously wounded and was replaced in command by Col. Aleksei Dmitrievich Gorichev, who would remain in this post for the duration of the war.

By 10 February, 121st and 70th Corps relieved the forces of 70th Army on the left bank of the Vistula River along the line Kulm - Grodek - Sierosław - Lniano in preparation for the offensive into eastern Pomerania. On 19 February the 49th Army was ordered to continue its attack in the direction of Sominy and Bytów, with the task of capturing the line Sominy - Kloden - the Liaskasee by the end of 24 February. This advance brought the Army's forces to the approaches to Gdańsk, and during the fourth stage of the offensive, from 14 to 30 March, the 49th was one of the armies that cleared and occupied the city.

== Berlin Offensive ==
At the start of the Berlin Strategic Offensive the rifle divisions of 2nd Belorussian Front varied in strength from 3,600 to 4,800 personnel each. 49th Army deployed on a 16 km front on the Oder River from Kranzfelde to Nipperwiese. The 121st Corps had the 380th and 42nd Rifle Divisions in the first echelon and the 199th in the second. During 18–19 April the Front launched intensive reconnaissance efforts in preparation for the crossings, including the elimination of German advance parties in the lowlands between the East and West Oder. The division's forces took part in this task and by the end of 19 April had reached the eastern bank of the West Oder. On 23 April the 49th Army tried to force the West Oder, but was hindered by German fire. In the Army's zone three ferry crossings, a 50-ton and a 16-ton bridge were in operation. During the day two regiments of the 380th and five battalions of the 199th were crossed. On 25 April the 49th Army exploited the greater success of the 65th and 70th Armies in their crossing operations and passed its remaining forces to the west bank along the Harz sector using the 70th Army's ferries. Attacking to the southwest and having beaten off five German counterattacks the Army advanced 5–6 km in the day's fighting, and by the evening the 121st Corps had reached the line Pinnow - Hohenfelde. Throughout April 29–30 49th Army attacked to the west, beginning in the Neustrelitz area, and on 3 May its forward detachments established contact with British Second Army advance units in the Grabow area.

Between 29 July 1944 and 14 April 1945 Cpl. Timofei Nikolaievich Sirotkin of the 945th Artillery Regiment was awarded the Order of the Red Star five times, more than any other NCO or enlisted man during the war. He also received the medal "For Courage" twice. The division's men and women ended the war as the 380th Rifle, Oryol, Order of the Red Banner, Order of Suvorov Division (Russian: 380-я стрелковая Орловская Краснознамённая орденов Суворова дивизия). However, on 17 May the division was further honored with the award of the Order of Kutuzov, 2nd Degree, for its role in the liberation of Gdańsk. According to STAVKA Order No. 11095 of 29 May 1945, part 6, the 380th is listed as one of the rifle divisions to be "disbanded in place". It was disbanded in accordance with the directive in July 1945.
