= 385th Rifle Division =

- Active: 1941 - 1945
- Country: Soviet Union
- Branch: Red Army
- Type: Division
- Role: Infantry
- Engagements: Battle of Moscow; Battle of Smolensk (1943); Novyi Bykhov - Propoisk Offensive; Operation Bagration; Minsk Offensive; Osovets Offensive; Vistula-Oder Offensive; East Pomeranian Offensive; Danzig Offensive Operation; Berlin Strategic Offensive Operation
- Decorations: Order of the Red Banner; Order of Suvorov
- Battle honours: Krichev

Commanders
- Notable commanders: Col. Ilya Mikhailovich Savin; Maj. Gen. Aleksandr Fedorovich Naumov; Maj. Gen. Mitrofan Fedorovich Suprunov

The 385th Rifle Division was raised in 1941 as an infantry division of the Red Army, and served for the duration of the Great Patriotic War in that role. It began forming in August 1941, in the Central Asian Military District. It was first assigned to Southwestern Front but on its arrival it was seen to be far from combat-ready and so was moved north to the Moscow area for further training. It served in the later stages of the counteroffensive west of the capital in Western Front and remained in that Front until early 1944. It was on a relatively quiet sector through most of 1942 and early 1943 before joining the summer offensive towards Smolensk. It then spent the autumn and winter in the costly and difficult struggles on the approaches to the upper Dniepr River and in eastern Belarus, during which it won a battle honor. From this point on it shared a very similar combat path with the 380th Rifle Division. The division took part in Operation Bagration and was awarded the Order of the Red Banner for its successes. Following this it helped to eliminate the German forces trapped east of Minsk, for which it received a second unit decoration, before joining the advance into Poland. During the Vistula-Oder Offensive the 385th was part of 2nd Belorussian Front's 49th Army, and ended the war advancing north of Berlin towards the Baltic coast. Despite its distinguished record it was selected as one of the many divisions to be disbanded during the summer of 1945.

== Formation ==
The 385th began forming in August 1941 at Frunze in the Central Asia Military District, Its order of battle was as follows:

- 1266th Rifle Regiment
- 1268th Rifle Regiment
- 1270th Rifle Regiment
- 948th Artillery Regiment
- 403rd Antitank Battalion
- 456th Antiaircraft Battery (later 672nd Antiaircraft Battalion, to 19 March 1943)
- 447th Reconnaissance Company
- 665th Sapper Battalion
- 836th Signal Battalion (later 247th Signal Company)
- 470th Medical/Sanitation Battalion
- 463rd Chemical Protection (Anti-gas) Company
- 500th Motor Transport Company
- 252nd Field Bakery
- 808th Divisional Veterinary Hospital
- 1417th Field Postal Station
- 756th Field Office of the State Bank

Col. Ilya Mikhailovich Savin was not assigned to command of the division until 1 October, and he would remain in command until 10 March 1942. In November the division's personnel were noted as being mostly Kyrghiz. These men had practically no time to train before they were ordered to the front. They arrived in the Volga Military District in mid-November and the division was briefly assigned to the 61st Army that was forming there, but instead of sending the raw unit into combat with that Army it was reassigned to the 24th Army in the Moscow Defence Zone for more than a month of working-up. By the beginning of February the 385th had joined the 10th Army in Western Front. On 11 March Col. Gavriil Markelovich Nemudrov took command of the division but ten days later he was replaced by Col. Aleksandr Fedorovich Naumov. Naumov would be promoted to the rank of major general on 21 May.

=== Battles west of Moscow ===
During March the division was transferred to the 50th Army. Having been reinforced with the 385th and other units, this Army, along with the 43rd and 49th Armies, was ordered to link up with the encircled 33rd Army and Group Belov in the Dorogobuzh area. Due to general exhaustion of the attacking units and dispersion of effort this attempt made minimal progress. The encircled force was finally authorized to break out in April. On 14 April, 50th Army attacked to try to join up with Group Belov, and at one point only 2 km remained between the two forces, but the next day German counterattacks forced 50th Army to fall back. On 20 April Western Front was ordered to go over to the defense, and in May the 385th returned to 10th Army. In June it was again reassigned, now to the 16th Army, and in early July took part in attacks against the Second Panzer Army south of the Rzhev salient, which made enough progress to alarm the command of Army Group Center. In August the division returned to 10th Army and would remain under that command until April 1944.

== Battles for Smolensk and Belorussia ==
On 1 August 1943 General Naumov handed his command to his chief of staff, Col. Mitrofan Fedorovich Suprunov, who would remain in this post for the duration of the war, being promoted to major general on 2 November 1944. The 385th took part in Operation Suvorov, the grinding offensive westward towards Smolensk, which began on 7 August, but did not involve 10th Army until three days later. On 10 August the commander of Western Front, Col. Gen. V. D. Sokolovsky, ordered the Army to attack north-west out of its salient around Kirov against the LVI Panzer Corps. The command of the German 4th Army was not expecting an attack from this direction, and three rifle divisions, with the 385th in second echelon, were able to punch through the left flank of the 321st Infantry Division and advance 5 km on the first day. This was the first breakthrough achieved in the offensive, but 10th Army did not have a mobile group to exploit it. 9th Panzer Division was ordered to intervene, but before it could arrive the Soviet divisions began to roll up the 131st Infantry Division, and the right flank of 4th Army began falling back to secondary positions.

Later in August the 385th was assigned to 38th Rifle Corps. A further offensive thrust began on September 15 and 10th Army was soon across the Desna River and aiming for Roslavl. As the summer offensive rolled into the autumn, on 29 September the division forced a crossing of the Sozh River with the 212th Rifle Division and liberated the town of Krichev, for which it was awarded a battle honor:

"By the order of the Supreme High Command, the name of Krichev is awarded to... 385th Rifle Division (Colonel Suprunov, Mitrofan Fedorovich)..."

In early October, as Western Front made its first attempt to liberate Orsha, 10th Army was on the Front's left flank, and 38th Corps deployed into positions in the bend of the Pronya River southeast of Chausy. Given the relatively small size of the Army it was limited to a passive, secondary role for the time being.

The Novyi Bykhov - Propoisk Offensive began on 22 November, but 10th Army did not join in until the 28th, attacking across the Pronya River just north of Petukhovka on its boundary with 50th Army. 38th Corps struck at the boundary between the German 131st and 260th Infantry Divisions' defenses south of Chausy, in cooperation with attacks by 50th Army's 369th Rifle Division. The 385th was in first echelon with the 64th Rifle Division, and the 212th in second. Within two days the two lead divisions had penetrated German defenses at Vysokoe, wheeled northward, and attacked their positions at Chausy, a city that anchored the right flank of German 9th Army. The 212th advanced as far as Shaparovo, 5 km south of Chausy; meanwhile the 64th and 385th seized Lepeny and other villages southwest of the city.

Chausy remained the objective of 10th Army during the following months. On 4 January 1944 the 3rd and 50th Armies launched a new attack in the direction of Bykhov. In support of this, 10th Army was ordered to attack German defenses north and south of Chausy at the junction of the Sozh and Pronya. For this diversionary assault, which began at dawn on 3 January, the 385th was detached from 38th Corps. The 290th Rifle Division, supported by most of the 160th and 76th Rifle Divisions, pushed across the Pronya between Putki and Skvarsk, 10 – 15 km north of Chausy. In heavy fighting the three divisions seized bridgeheads north and south of the fortified village of Prilepovka but were not able to take the village itself. Overnight the bridgeheads were reinforced by elements of the 385th and the next day the combined force took the village of Baryshevka, 2 km north of Prilepovka, as well as Putki, but was then halted at the outskirts of Voskhod, 5 km to the west, by counterattacking reserves of the 35th Infantry Division. Further efforts stalled, but a valuable bridgehead over the Pronya had been won in two days of fighting.

In 10 February Army and its 38th Corps was transferred to Army Gen. K. K. Rokossovsky's Belorussian Front. Rokossovsky was determined to eliminate the German 9th Army's bridgehead on the east bank of the Dniepr between Bykhov and Chausy. 38th Corps was assigned a leading role in this attack, which began on 25 March. 10th Army was to penetrate the defenses of the German 12th Infantry Division on an 8-km-wide sector southwest of Chausy. Following this, 38th Corps would exploit to the northwest and reach the southeast outskirts of Mogilev by the end of 1 April, a total advance of 30 km. The Corps was reinforced with two additional divisions, an armored train battalion was on hand for fire support, and the 1st Guards Tank Corps was available in the rear. On the attack sector the Corps had the 64th and 139th Rifle Divisions in the first echelon and the 385th in second. The assault went in on schedule after a short artillery preparation but over three days of fighting hardly dented the German defenses. Overnight on 28/29 March the 290th Rifle Division was brought up to reinforce the 385th's attack, but this also failed after minimal gains. In an after action report it was noted that on 29 March the division was ordered to exploit gains made by the 290th, but while the distance to be covered was no more than 1.5 km, it wasted more than four hours which allowed the German force to reorganize its defense. The next day, after units of the reinforcing 49th Rifle Division made a penetration, Colonel Suprunov was ordered to commit his 1268th Rifle Regiment into the gap; in the event the regiment's commander lost control over his battalions and took six hours to cover 3 km. The remainder of the division spent the entire night regrouping and were unable to assist the 49th until it was too late. This "litany of cold and hard combat experiences" explain why 10th Army's offensive collapsed by 31 March.

=== Operation Bagration ===
In April the 385th, along with its 38th Corps, was moved to the newly formed 2nd Belorussian Front, into 49th Army; the division would remain in that Front for the duration of the war. By the start of the summer offensive 38th Corps was reassigned to 50th Army. The Front's objective in the first phase was to break through the defenses of 4th Army along the Pronya, force the Dniepr and liberate Mogilev, much the same as in March. Following a 30-minute artillery preparation the operation began at 0400 hours on 22 June with a reconnaissance in force; on the 50th Army sector this was carried out by reinforced rifle battalions of the 385th and 380th Rifle Divisions, which gathered information on the German defensive system and took prisoners.

The main attack began the next day and, in general, 4th Army's defense held; however, the Army's commander was already seeking permission to withdraw his XXXIX Panzer Corps behind the Dniepr. On 24 June, the 19th Corps of 50th Army penetrated the 267th Infantry Division's line at Ludchitsa, while on the front held by 57th Infantry Division to the south much of the rest of the Army advanced 10 km west of the Drut River at Podsely. At 0600 hours on 25 June the Front's three attacking armies struck the remnants of the 337th, 12th Infantry and Feldherrenhalle Divisions and drove them back over the Basya River. Chausy was finally taken by elements of 50th Army and by evening a column of 90 Soviet tanks and infantry in trucks was on the road to Mogilev. The order for the next day was to reach the Dniepr north and south of the city. On the XXXIX Panzer Corps sector to the south the 12th and 31st Infantry Divisions held prepared positions east of the Dniepr in the morning but were finally dislodged during the day by the 38th and 121st Rifle Corps' attacks. By 2200 hours the two corps were closing up to the east bank of the Dniepr.

On 27 June the 12th Infantry fell back to try to hold Mogilev itself. The next day the 49th and 50th Armies took the city after a stiff fight and heavy casualties. The two armies then began an all-out advance to the Drut. On 1 July on the Chervyen - Berezino road the composite Battle Group König (one regiment of the 31st Division and other remnants) was fighting the 38th and 19th Corps, which had crossed the Berezina River north of Brodets. Late in the morning Soviet tanks in Chervyen drove the German force farther west, at which point Boldin's army cut off 4th Army's remaining retreat route and headed for Minsk.

During the next few days the 385th was reassigned to 49th Army, initially as a separate division; it would remain in this Army for the duration. On 9 July, 49th Army was tasked with the elimination of the German remnants in the pocket east of Minsk, in what was called the Osovets Offensive. The 385th, along with four other separate divisions, the 38th Corps, and NKVD rear security troops were to methodically comb through the forested areas east of the city with light air support. This operation ended on 13 July and while it was going on, on 10 July the division was awarded the Order of the Red Banner for its role in the forcing of the Pronya and Dniepr and the liberation of the cities of Mogilev, Shklov and Bykhov earlier in the campaign. On 1 September it was further decorated with the Order of Suvorov, 2nd Degree, for its successes in the Osovets operation.

In late July the 385th was assigned to the 70th Rifle Corps, then in August to the 121st before going back to Army control in September; it returned to the 70th in September, where it would remain for most of the duration. During those months the division received replacement riflemen from the 205th Reserve Rifle Regiment, but only a few hundred given the dearth of front line infantry at that stage of the war. As the offensive pressed on into Poland, on 13 September the division played a leading role in the liberation of the city of Lomzha, and the 1268th and 1270th Rifle Regiments were both awarded that name as a battle honor.

== Vistula-Oder Offensive ==
In the advance into Poland the division reached as far as the Narew River, where it would remain until the start of the Vistula-Oder Offensive. In the planning for this operation, 2nd Belorussian's Front's 3rd Army was to launch an attack along its left flank on a 6 km front, in the general direction of Janowo and Allenstein; 49th Army, while securely defending the Narew line from Novogrod to Chelsty with one corps would take advantage of 3rd Army's breakthrough to attack with its own main forces in the direction of Myszyniec.

The offensive began on 14 January 1945, in conditions of poor visibility. 3rd Army crushed the resistance of the German units facing it, breaking through to a depth of 5 km on a 10 km front and creating the conditions for the 49th Army to follow. This advance began the next day, with 70th Corps in the Army's second echelon. On 16 January the 49th continued attacking along its left flank but ran into stubborn enemy resistance and gained only 2 – 3 km during the day. 70th Corps was deployed by the end of the day in an area 5–10 km northwest and northeast of Rozan. On 18 January, the last day of the first phase of the offensive, the units of 49th Army continued to attack along the west bank of the Narew.

Later in the month the division took part in the clearing of the Masurian Lake District. On 27 January the 1266th Rifle Regiment was granted the honorific "Barten" for its role in the capture of that village, and on 5 April the 1268th Regiment was awarded the Order of the Red Banner for its part in these actions. By 10 February, 70th and 121st Corps relieved the forces of 70th Army on the left bank of the Vistula River along the line Kulm - Grodek - Sierosław - Lniano in preparation for the offensive into eastern Pomerania. At this time the 385th was moved to the 114th Rifle Corps. On 19 February the 49th Army was ordered to continue its attack in the direction of Sominy and Bytów, with the task of capturing the line Sominy - Kloden - the Liaskasee by the end of 24 February. This advance brought the Army's forces to the approaches to Gdańsk, and during the fourth stage of the offensive, from 14 to 30 March, the 49th was one of the armies that cleared and occupied the city. During this stage the division was part of 121st Corps.

== Berlin Offensive ==
At the start of the Berlin Strategic Offensive the rifle divisions of 2nd Belorussian Front varied in strength from 3,600 to 4,800 personnel each. 49th Army deployed on a 16 km front on the Oder River from Kranzfelde to Nipperwiese. The 385th had returned to 70th Corps and was in the first echelon with the 139th and 238th Rifle Divisions. During 18–19 April the Front launched intensive reconnaissance efforts in preparation for the crossings, including the elimination of German advance parties in the lowlands between the East and West Oder. The division's forces took part in this task and by the end of 19 April had reached the eastern bank of the West Oder. On 23 April the 49th Army tried to force the West Oder, but was hindered by German fire. In the Army's zone three ferry crossings, a 50-ton and a 16-ton bridge were in operation. During the day only a portion of 121st Corps' forces were able to cross. On 25 April the 49th Army exploited the greater success of the 65th and 70th Armies in their crossing operations and passed its remaining forces to the west bank along the Harz sector using the 70th Army's ferries. Attacking to the southwest and having beaten off five German counterattacks the Army advanced 5–6 km in the day's fighting, and by the evening part of the 70th Corps had reached a line between Gatow and Hohenfelde. Throughout April 29–30 49th Army attacked to the west, beginning in the Neustrelitz area, and on 3 May its forward detachments established contact with British Second Army advance units in the Grabow area.

On 26 April the 948th Artillery Regiment was awarded the Order of the Red Banner for its part in the fighting for Küstrin, and on the same date the 1270th Rifle Regiment received the same decoration for its successes at Kartuzy and Lauenburg. The division's men and women ended the war as the 385th Rifle, Krichev, Order of the Red Banner, Order of Suvorov Division (Russian: 385-я стрелковая Кричевская Краснознамённая орденов Суворова дивизия). On 4 June the 1268th Rifle Regiment received the Order of Suvorov, 3rd Degree, for its part in the fighting in the Stettin area and the 1266th Regiment was granted the same award in recognition of its role in the seizing of Templin and Torgelow. According to STAVKA Order No. 11095 of 29 May 1945, part 6, the 385th is listed as one of the rifle divisions to be "disbanded in place". It was disbanded in accordance with the directive in July 1945.
