= Biechowo =

Biechowo refers to the following places in Poland:

- Biechowo, Greater Poland Voivodeship
- Biechowo, Kuyavian-Pomeranian Voivodeship
