= Kaliska =

Kaliska may refer to the following places:

- Kaliska, Świecie County in Kuyavian-Pomeranian Voivodeship (north-central Poland)
- Kaliska, Włocławek County in Kuyavian-Pomeranian Voivodeship (north-central Poland)
- Kaliska, Masovian Voivodeship (east-central Poland)
- Kaliska, Konin County in Greater Poland Voivodeship (west-central Poland)
- Kaliska, Międzychód County in Greater Poland Voivodeship (west-central Poland)
- Kaliska, Wągrowiec County in Greater Poland Voivodeship (west-central Poland)
- Kaliska, Lubusz Voivodeship (west Poland)
- Kaliska, Chojnice County in Pomeranian Voivodeship (north Poland)
- Kaliska, Kartuzy County in Pomeranian Voivodeship (north Poland)
- Kaliska, Gmina Kaliska in Pomeranian Voivodeship (north Poland)
- Kaliska, Gmina Lubichowo in Pomeranian Voivodeship (north Poland)
- Kaliska, Gryfino County in West Pomeranian Voivodeship (north-west Poland)
- Kaliska, Szczecinek County in West Pomeranian Voivodeship (north-west Poland)
- Łódź Kaliska railway station, the main railway station of Łódź

== See also ==
- Elena Kaliská, Slovak canoeist
