= Drzycim =

- Village
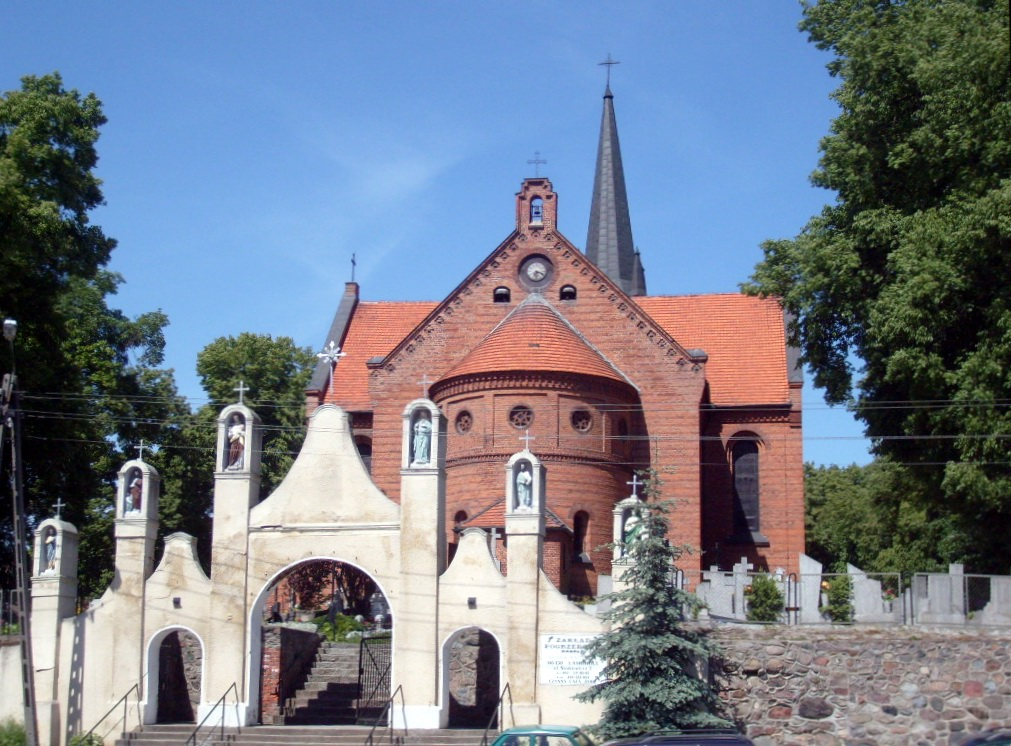
- Our Lady of Consolation church in Drzycim

- Location within Poland
- Coordinates: 53°30′48″N 18°18′59″E
- Country: Poland
- Voivodeship: Kuyavian-Pomeranian
- County: Świecie
- Gmina: Drzycim
- Population: 1,200
- Time zone: UTC+1 (CET)
  - Summer (DST): UTC+2 (CEST)
- Vehicle registration: CSW
- Website: Drzycim

Drzycim [ˈdʐɨt͡ɕim] is a village in Świecie County, Kuyavian-Pomeranian Voivodeship, in north-central Poland. It is the seat of the gmina (administrative district) called Gmina Drzycim.

== History ==
During the German occupation of Poland (World War II), inhabitants of Drzycim were among the victims of a massacre of Poles committed by the German Selbstschutz in nearby Jastrzębie in January 1940.
