= Wery =

Wery may refer to:

== Places ==
- Wery, Kuyavian-Pomeranian Voivodeship, a village in Poland
- Wery, Warmian-Masurian Voivodeship, a village in Poland

== People ==
- Henk Wery (born 1943), Dutch footballer
- Carl Wery (1894–1975), German actress
- Leonard Wery, Dutch field hockey player
- Laurent Wéry (born 1975), Belgian DJ
- Marthe Wéry (1930–2005), Belgian painter
