= Gacki, Kuyavian-Pomeranian Voivodeship =

Village in Kociewie

Gacki
- Village
- Location within Poland
- Coordinates: 53°30′N 18°20′E
- Country: Poland
- Voivodeship: Kuyavian-Pomeranian
- County: Świecie
- Gmina: Drzycim

Gacki (Polish pronunciation: [ˈɡat͡skʲi]) is a village in the administrative district of Gmina Drzycim, within Świecie County, Kuyavian-Pomeranian Voivodeship, in north-central Poland.
