= Sierosławek =

Village in Kociewie

- Village
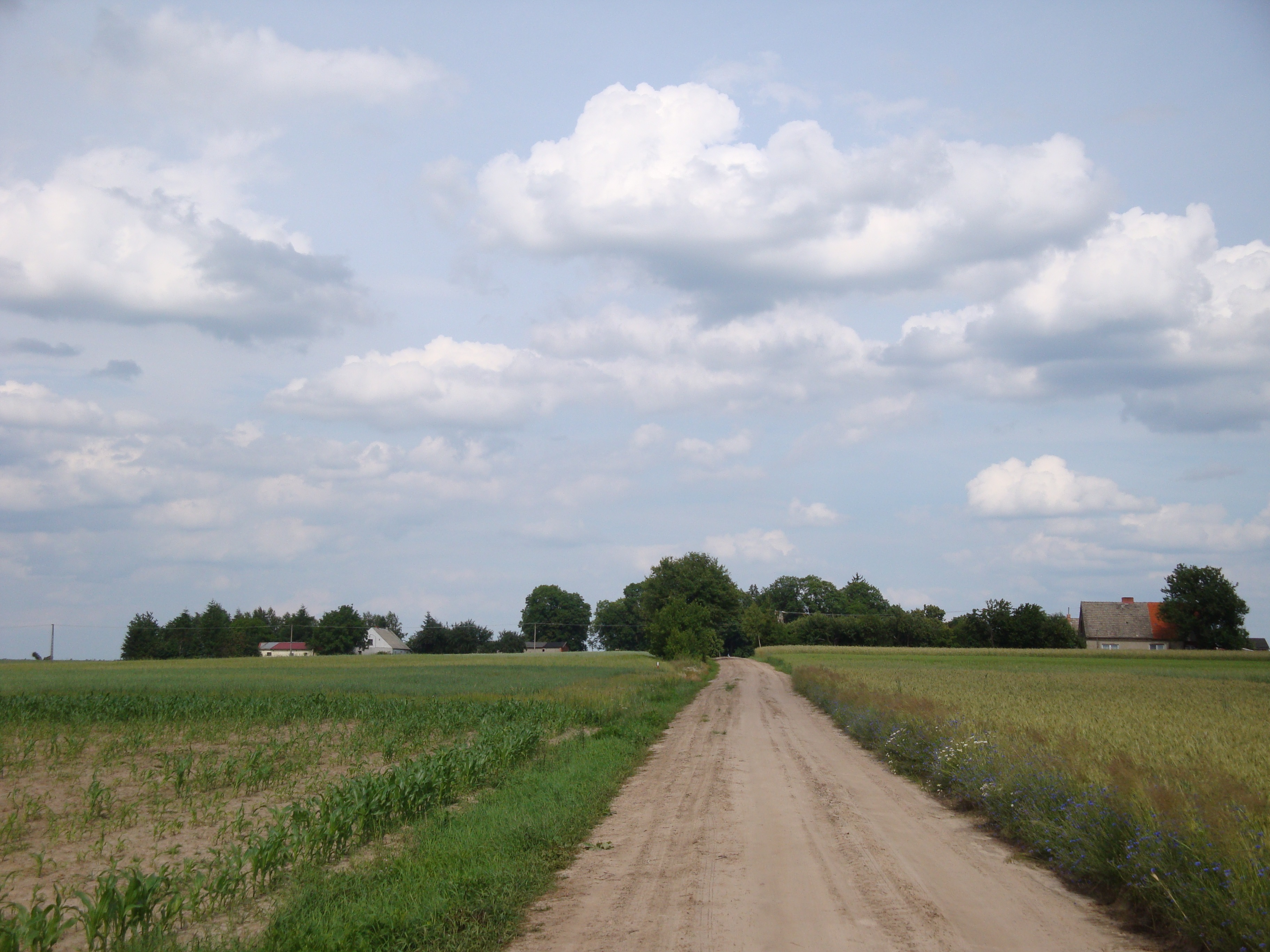
- View from the west

- Location within Poland
- Coordinates: 53°34′N 18°20′E
- Country: Poland
- Voivodeship: Kuyavian-Pomeranian
- County: Świecie
- Gmina: Drzycim

Sierosławek [ɕɛrɔˈswavɛk] is a village in the administrative district of Gmina Drzycim, within Świecie County, Kuyavian-Pomeranian Voivodeship, in north-central Poland.
