= Rówienica =

Village in Kociewie

- Village
- Location within Poland
- Coordinates: 53°31′14″N 18°20′31″E
- Country: Poland
- Voivodeship: Kuyavian-Pomeranian
- County: Świecie
- Gmina: Drzycim
- Population: 80

Rówienica [ruvjɛˈnit͡sa] is a village in the administrative district of Gmina Drzycim, within Świecie County, Kuyavian-Pomeranian Voivodeship, in north-central Poland.
