= Gmina Drzycim =

Gmina Drzycim Drzycim Commune
- Gmina
- Flag Coat of arms
- Interactive map of Gmina Drzycim
- Coordinates (Drzycim): 53°30′48″N 18°18′59″E
- Country: Poland
- Voivodeship: Kuyavian-Pomeranian
- County: Świecie
- Seat: Drzycim

Area
  - Total: 107.92 km^{2} (41.67 sq mi)

Population (2006)
  - Total: 5,028
  - Density: 46.59/km^{2} (120.7/sq mi)
- Website: http://www.drzycim.pl/

Gmina Drzycim is a rural gmina (administrative district) in Świecie County, Kuyavian-Pomeranian Voivodeship, in north-central Poland. Its seat is the village of Drzycim, which lies approximately 14 kilometres (9 mi) north-west of Świecie, 49 km (30 mi) north-east of Bydgoszcz, and 57 km (35 mi) north of Toruń.

The gmina covers an area of 107.92 square kilometres (41.7 sq mi), and as of 2006 its total population is 5,028.

The gmina contains part of the protected area called Wda Landscape Park.

== Villages ==
Gmina Drzycim contains the villages and settlements of Bedlenki, Biechówko, Biechowo, Dąbrówka, Dólsk, Drzycim, Gacki, Gródek, Jastrzębie, Kaliska, Krakówek, Leosia, Lubocheń, Mały Dólsk, Rówienica, Sierosław, Sierosławek, Spławie and Wery.

== Neighbouring gminas ==
Gmina Drzycim is bordered by the gminas of Bukowiec, Jeżewo, Lniano, Osie and Świecie.
