= 160th Rifle Division (1941 formation) =

160th Rifle Division (September 26, 1941 - July 1945)
- Active: 1941–1945
- Country: Soviet Union
- Branch: Red Army
- Type: Infantry
- Size: Division
- Engagements: Operation Typhoon; Battle of Moscow; Battles of Rzhev; Battle of Smolensk (1943); Orsha offensives (1943); Bykhov-Chausy Offensive; Operation Bagration; Lublin–Brest offensive Vistula-Oder Offensive; East Pomeranian offensive Berlin Strategic Offensive Operation
- Decorations: Order of the Red Banner
- Battle honours: Brest

Commanders
- Notable commanders: Col. Fyodor Mikhailovich Orlov; Maj. Vitalii Modestovich Rusetskii; Col. Ernest Zhanovich Sedulin; Maj. Gen. Boleslav Frantsevich Zarako-Zarakovskii; Maj. Gen. Nikolai Sergeevich Timofeev; Col. Yusif Mirza oglu Abdullayev

The 1941 formation of the 160th Rifle Division was an infantry division of the Red Army, originally formed as the 6th Moscow Militia Division (Dzerzhinskii) in early July 1941. The division gradually completed its formation in the 24th Army of Reserve Front east of Smolensk but was not committed to combat until after it was renumbered as the 160th on September 26. This renumbering was based on a misunderstanding that the original 160th had been encircled and destroyed earlier that month; as a result for the next 18 months there were two 160th Rifle Divisions serving concurrently.

The 1941 formation was swept up in Operation Typhoon in October and came so close to being destroyed itself that it disappeared from the Red Army order of battle at the start of November. It returned to the fighting as part of 33rd Army in late January 1942 but was still so under strength that two of its rifle regiments had to be reformed by wholesale replacements from other divisions and it was not until the late spring that it was fully combat-capable. The 160th played minor roles in the battles around the Rzhev salient into early 1943 and then a more active part in the summer offensive toward Smolensk, under 33rd Army until September when it was transferred to 49th Army, both in Western Front. When that Front was disbanded in early 1944 the division was transferred to 2nd Belorussian Front where it joined 70th Army; it would remain under this army almost continually for the duration of the war, from April as part of the 114th Rifle Corps. Prior to Operation Bagration that Army was reassigned to 1st Belorussian Front and during its latter stage the 160th was awarded the Order of the Red Banner for its part in the breakthrough of the German defenses west of Kovel and at the end of August earned the honorific "Brest", along with one of its rifle regiments, for the liberation of that city. Near the end of the year the division transferred back to 2nd Belorussian Front and under that command served in the Vistula-Oder Offensive and the East Pomeranian Offensive; during the latter operation two of its subunits were awarded the honorific "Gdańsk". During the Berlin operation the 160th fought across the Oder River and northward to the Baltic, ending the war in northern Germany. As it was surplus to requirements postwar it was disbanded in June 1945.

== 6th Moscow Militia Division (Dzerzhinskii) ==
The division began forming on July 2, 1941 as part of a wave of volunteer enthusiasm that swept Moscow immediately after the German invasion. It was composed of volunteers from the Dzerzhinskii district in the north-central part of the city. It was intended to have the following order of battle:

- 16th (Militia) Rifle Regiment
- 17th (Militia) Rifle Regiment
- 18th (Militia) Rifle Regiment
- Artillery Battalion (76mm)
- Artillery Battalion (45mm)
- Tank, Sapper, Signal, Reconnaissance Companies

Maj. Gen. Nikolai Mikhailovich Dreier was appointed to command the day the division started forming but was replaced on July 7 by Col. Aleksei Ivanovich Shundeev. By July 11 the division had 7,456 personnel assigned, but no equipment. Later that month it was assigned to 24th Army in Reserve Front along the defense line that was being constructed at Mozhaysk but it was still extremely short of weapons and was kept out of the front lines. The writer Konstantin Simonov encountered some of these militiamen:

In the next village we met units from one of the Moscow volunteer divisions, apparently the 6th. I remember that they produced a gloomy impression on me at the time... I found it hard to bear. I thought: do we really have no other reserves besides these volunteers, dressed anyhow and barely armed? One rifle for two men, and one machine gun. For the most part they were not young: forty or fifty years old. They marched without supply wagons, without the normal regimental and divisional support... Their uniforms were second- or third-hand tunics: some had once been dyed blue. Their commanders were not young either, reservists who had not served for many years. They all still needed to be trained, formed, and made to look like soldiers.

On August 14 it had 599 officers, 808 NCOs, and 5,607 enlisted personnel, but still had only 6,335 rifles, 62 light and 208 heavy machine guns, and only four 76mm guns for its heavy weapons. By the end of the month the division was finally beginning to take shape as a combat unit. On August 31 it consisted of 9,791 men, including 405 officers, 1,035 NCOs, and 8,054 enlisted men armed with 7,358 rifles, 574 semi-automatic rifles, 43 HMGs, 81 50mm, 54 82mm, and six 120mm mortars, 12 76mm guns, 20 T-27 tankettes in the tank company, 144 trucks of all kinds, 15 motorcycles, and 26 radios. At this time the volunteers were issued proper uniforms and took the military oath and each division was given its battle flag in a ceremony of great solemnity. However, since the 6th still had almost no artillery and the T-27s had actually been retrofitted after serving as tractors it remained in the reserves of 24th Army.

=== Redesignation ===
At the beginning of September the 1940 formation of the 160th was part of Group Akimenko in Bryansk Front stationed west of Rylsk. The 17th Panzer Division captured Glukhov on September 9, shattering the communications between the armies of the Front. The division was caught up in this fighting and largely encircled. In the effort to break out it took heavy casualties and on September 18 its commander was taken prisoner. In the prevailing chaos it was believed the division had been destroyed leaving its number available to be reallocated. However, by the beginning of October the 1940 formation had a new commander and was rebuilding in Bryansk Front.

When the 6th Moscow Militia Division was redesignated its order of battle, based on the shtat (table of organization and equipment) of July 29, became as follows:

- 1293rd Rifle Regiment
- 1295th Rifle Regiment
- 1297th Rifle Regiment
- 973rd Artillery Regiment
- 290th Antitank Battalion
- 186th Reconnaissance Company
- 462nd Sapper Battalion
- 547th Signal Battalion (later 861st Signal Battalion, 861st Signal Company, then reverted to 547th)
- 191st Medical/Sanitation Battalion (later 495th)
- 262nd Chemical Defense (Anti-gas) Company
- 194th Motor Transport Company
- 149th Field Bakery
- 276th Divisional Veterinary Hospital (later 160th)
- 1469th Field Postal Station
- 1141st Field Office of the State Bank (later 149th)

Several of the rear-echelon subunits, such as the medical/sanitation battalion, took over numbers that had been allocated to the 1940 formation, although some of these were later changed. Col. Fyodor Mikhailovich Orlov took over command from Colonel Shundeev on the day the division was redesignated as the 160th. The latter officer would die in battle on October 9.

== Battle of Moscow ==
By late in September it was becoming clear that the German High Command was planning a new offensive aimed at Moscow before the start of the autumn rasputitsa. Reserve Front was by now under command of Marshal S. M. Budyonny and controlled six armies. The 24th and 43rd Armies with 10 divisions were deployed in the first echelon between the Western and Bryansk Fronts on a front of 108 km from the area of Yelnya to the Roslavl–Kirov railroad. 33rd Army was in second echelon backing the 24th and 43rd and both of the latter were poorly equipped and weakened from fruitless attacks to improve their positions. The sector of 24th Army was up to 40 km wide with four divisions in first echelon and one in the second. The 160th was part of a combined-arms reserve with the 144th and 146th Tank Brigades, and the 879th and 880th Antitank Artillery Regiments.

=== Operation Typhoon ===
The 24th Army's intelligence summary from September 26 directly stated:

The enemy is shifting units from the Yelnia axis to the Roslavl–Pochinok direction, and by this is striving to create a superiority of force, plainly in readiness for an offensive within the next few days on the Roslavl axis.

The offensive by 4th Army and 4th Panzer Group began on this sector on October 2 and within days the 160th was in serious difficulties. The German VII and XX Army Corps quickly drove in the left (south) flank of 24th Army and began pushing northeastward, encircling and destroying several Soviet formations in their paths by October 5. The chief of the political section of 24th Army, Division-Commissar K. K. Abramov, reported:

6 October: The adversary didn't allow a possibility to the units of these divisions to break contact... and as they withdrew... they were compelled to fight their way out of encirclement. By the evening of 6 October, the regiments of the 24th Army, shedding blood and fighting fiercely, had already lost the majority of their troops, who fell on the lines they were defending near Yelnya. As a result of the combat on this day the 8th Rifle Division could no longer hold a front of 20 kilometres, and the enemy emerged into the rear along the axis toward Dorogobuzh... The 6th Rifle Division [actually the 160th Rifle Division] also couldn't hold its line, because the front had no switch positions and the enemy was attacking from behind... the army headquarters wound up isolated from its units and from Semlevo, backed up against the swampy bottom land of the Osma River and was compelled... to conduct a fighting withdrawal to Semlevo.

The withdrawal was covered by the 8th and 139th Rifle Divisions. In comparison to the retreats of the 19th and 20th Armies it was conducted in much more difficult circumstances and was less organized. The withdrawal routes became densely congested with vehicles, wagons, tanks, towed guns and other combat equipment; now and then traffic jams arose. Antiaircraft defenses were disorganized and almost completely ineffective due to ammunition shortages. Abramov reported that the 160th, along with the two rearguard divisions along with the Army-level units and divisional rear elements withdrew along the road from Volochek to Semlyovo on the morning of October 7. German forces had seized the Yelnia–Markhotkino road through Yaroslavets, threatening the 24th Army headquarters in the Volochek area. Communications were only possible by radio.

A massive logjam of artillery, pack trains and vehicles formed at the crossing over the Osma at Dorogobuzh but despite German air attacks organization was maintained and there were few signs of panic as the retreat continued toward Vyasma. Later the same day German forces took control of Dorogobuzh and Volochek and began attacking toward Semlyovo from the south. This attempt to cut the path of retreat constituted the greatest danger to 24th Army; the Army was effectively pulling back into a trap that had been set for it. By that night it was clear to at least the command elements of the Army that it had been encircled and its chief-of-staff proposed a joint breakout in the direction of Vyasma to the military council of 32nd Army, but this was rejected. During the evening of October 8 orders came via the headquarters of 20th Army to organize a breakout by itself and the 24th with the 24th advancing on a front from Volosta to Piatnitsa to Ugra Station. Abramov considered this much too broad a front to be effective, which turned out to be the case. By the morning of October 9 the remnants of 24th Army, including the 160th, had begun to arrive in the area of Panfilovo and to the south.

The army commanders were to choose the specific routes of escape or breakout sectors based upon the situation each faced. None had any clear idea of what forces they opposed (at this point roughly five panzer divisions) which were rapidly contracting the pocket. Abramov reported:

On the morning of 9 October, following behind the 24th Army's 139th Rifle Division and repeatedly clashing with the enemy, the part of the 24th Army headquarters headed by Major-General KONDRAT'EV wound up encircled by the Germans in the Panfilovo area. The further fate of this group... [is] not known to me, because at that time I was in the middle of combat together with Colonel UTVENKO, the commander of the 19th Rifle Division, organizing a troop breakout in the direction of Selivanovo.

Kondratev reached friendly lines on October 18 in the Dorokhovo region, together with a group of up to 180 men. By the end of October 9 the headquarters of Western Front had learned that German forces were now blocking all the escape routes for the 20th and 24th Armies. From this point the circumstances of the trapped forces continued to deteriorate. The 17th Rifle Division (former 17th Moscow Militia) reached friendly lines on October 12 with 17 officers and NCOs and 94 soldiers carrying 123 rifles, two sub-machine guns and one light machine gun. The 160th was in similar state. A surviving squad leader, E. S. Olshanikov, brought out of the encirclement the divisional banner and two regimental banners; this, along with the survival of Colonel Orlov and some of his command cadre, ensured that the division was not disbanded. Five other former Moscow militia divisions (2nd, 8th, 29th, 139th and 140th Rifle Divisions) were eventually written off and about 70,000 volunteers had perished.

=== Rebuilding and Winter Counteroffensive ===
The 160th reappears in the Soviet order of battle on December 1 in the reserves of Western Front. It did not return to the fighting front until January 20, 1942, when it became part of the assault group of 33rd Army to the southeast of Vyasma. Given that the Red Army had been throwing everything available into the counteroffensive west of Moscow since early December the division must have been in a very poor state to remain out of combat for seven weeks. On January 3 the remnants of the 1134th Rifle Regiment of the 338th Rifle Division and the 1290th Regiment of the 113th Rifle Division, both part of 33rd Army, were transferred to replace the 1293rd Rifle Regiment which had not yet been reformed. This composite regiment would be redesignated as the 1293rd on March 31.

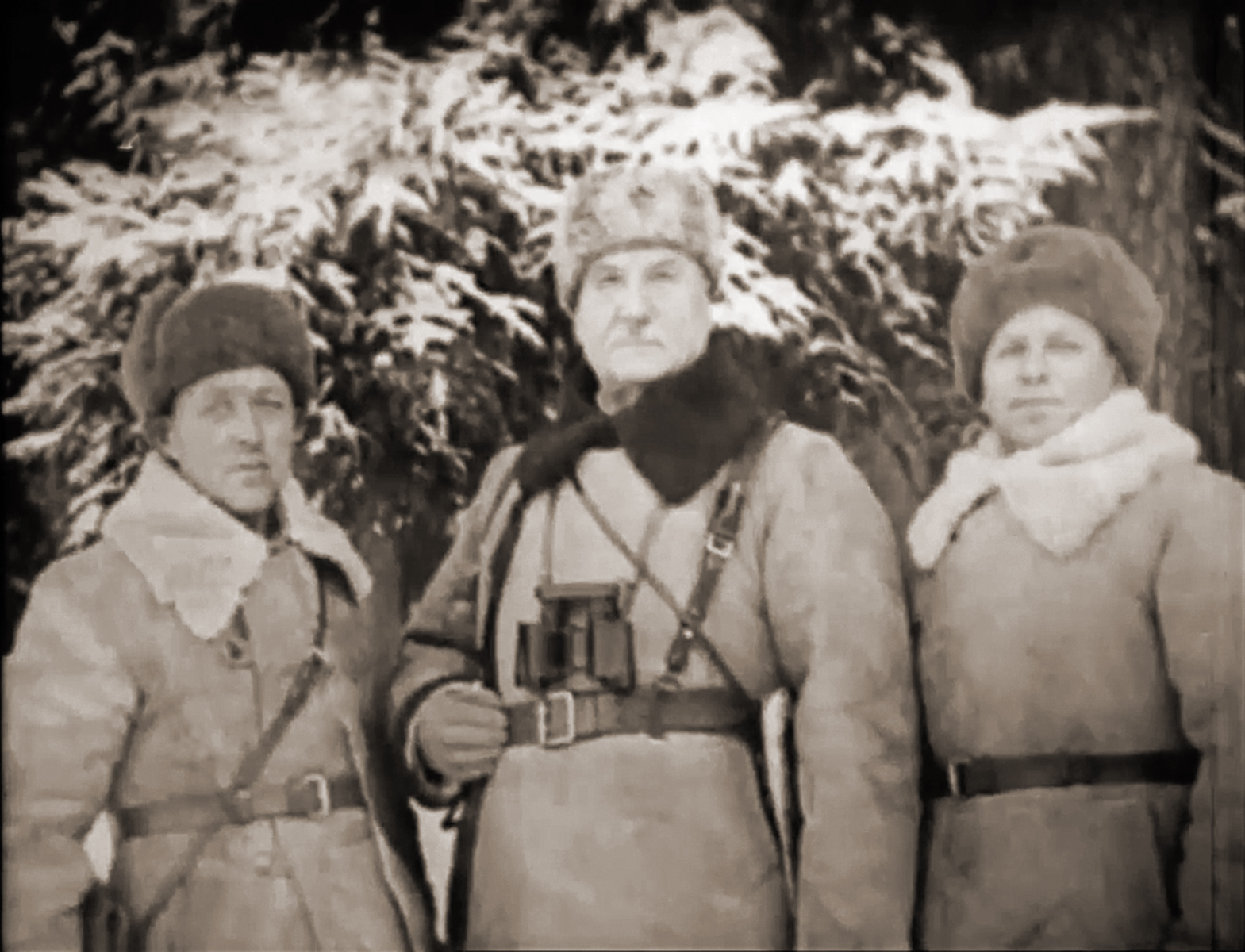
Colonel F. M. Orlov (center) with two of his subordinates, winter 1941-42

By this time the 33rd Army was operating to the west of Kaluga, roughly in the center of Western Front, pushing toward Vyasma in an effort to cut off the forces of Army Group Center in the salient that was forming around Sychyovka and Rzhev. The Army's divisions were generally successful in defeating small German units but each such battle distracted the troops advancing to the west from their assigned goal. As a result, the Army's formations were widely strung out on the march; a report from January 26 stated in part: "The 160th Rifle Division, which had been included in the 33rd Army, attacked Nekrasovo, from which it was then to take up position on the army's left flank." On the same date the Front commander, Army Gen. G. K. Zhukov, demanded that this Army "reach the area Krasnyi Kholm–Gredyakino–Podrezovo by forced march and link up with an airborne landing by the 4th Airborne Corps and the Kalinin Front's cavalry."

January 28 saw the 113th Division reach the Kuznetsovka–Morozovo area and the 338th Division the Buslava area while the 160th followed Zhukov's direction and force-marched to the west, but the remainder of the Army effectively stalled. The next day the division reached the area Korshuntsy–Lyadnoe, but in this fighting Colonel Orlov was wounded severely enough that he was hospitalized and forced to hand over command to Maj. Vitalii Modestovich Rusetskii. This officer would in turn be replaced on February 9 Maj. Gen. Vasilii Andreevich Revyakin, who had previously commanded the 8th Guards Rifle Division.

On the night of February 1/2 these three divisions took up jumping off positions for the attack on Vyasma. The 113th was in the area of Dashkovka to Yastrebovo with the direction of attack toward Boznya; the 338th was in the woods to the west of Vorobevka aiming toward Kazakovo and Yamskaya; while the 160th occupied the woods southwest of Lyado with its attack axis directed toward Alekseevskoe. The next day the division began a stubborn fight for this place and on February 3 units of 33rd Army in the Stogovo area linked up with 1st Guards Cavalry Corps as the battle for Vyasma grew in size and the trailing divisions of the Army joined the fighting. While the German forces were in a difficult situation the deep advance along a narrow front by 33rd Army carried its own risks. In 12 days of fighting the 160th, along with the 113th and 338th, had covered a distance of 80–90 km amid hard frosts and deep snow cover but this needle-like thrust did not prove effective. Vyasma was not taken and 33rd Army found itself in considerable difficulty during the coming months. On February 23 General Revyakin was appointed to command of the 1st Guards Motor Rifle Division and Major Rusetskii again took over the 160th.

=== 33rd Army Encircled ===
As the Army fought for Vyasma the German High Command was already taking steps to counter the penetration. Up to six understrength divisions had been moved to the area and on February 2–3 Soviet gains north and south of Yukhnov were driven back, leaving the 33rd, as well as 1st Guards Cavalry and the 8th Airborne Brigade all but completely encircled. Zhukov ordered the 43rd Army to break through to the encircled group; this effort would also soon involve the 49th and 50th Armies. However, the command of Army Group Center reinforced its troops defending Yukhnov and all attempts to break in failed. The supply situation soon became catastrophic, especially given the lack of air transport. The 33rd turned to local partisans for assistance and support, drafting local men into the ranks under an order signed by Stalin on February 9. For most purposes the pocketed Army operated as partisans over the next months.

At the beginning of March an attempt was made the breach the ring of encirclement by units of 33rd Army from within and a shock group of 43rd Army from without. The German command brought up additional forces. The gap between the two attacking Soviet groups narrowed to just 2 km but they were unable to overcome the remaining distance. Conditions inside the pocket worsened on a daily basis. On March 11 a total of 12,780 personnel remained trapped and a report by Western Front's chief of the NKVD Special Department (dated April 8) stated in part:

... a significant amount of the artillery has been idled by a lack of fuel and ammunition. Casualties from 1 February to 13 March 1942 amount to 1,290 killed and 2,351 wounded. We are not receiving replacements... Sustenance... consists of a small quantity of boiled rye and horse meat. There is no salt, fats or sugar at all. Due to the starvation diet, cases of illness among the troops are becoming more frequent... on the night of 14 March, two soldiers died of emaciation.

Further orders from the Front demanded that 43rd, 49th and 50th Armies relieve the pocket by March 27, but the general exhaustion of the Red Army after months of counterattacking, plus the onset of the spring rasputitsa, doomed these efforts to failure. Meanwhile, Army Group Center was determined to clear its rear areas. Seven divisions were concentrated against the pocket which was soon reduced to an area of roughly 10 km by 25 km. In early April the 33rd was finally authorized to withdraw through forests under partisan control in the direction of Kirov, a distance of up to 180 km. In the attempt the Army's commander, Lt. Gen. M. G. Yefremov was wounded and took his own life to avoid capture. Only a few thousand men managed to filter out to friendly lines. In the 160th Major Rusetskii was wounded in the shoulder by an explosive bullet on April 14 and was taken prisoner on April 27; several days previously he had been promoted to the rank of lieutenant colonel. He would die on November 15, 1943 in the Flossenbürg concentration camp. On April 24 Col. Ernest Zhanovich Sedulin took over the division which had again been reduced to a remnant but avoided being disbanded.

== Battles of Rzhev ==
As of the beginning of May the 33rd Army consisted of just five battered rifle divisions; on May 24 the 338th, having already lost a rifle regiment to the 160th, was officially disbanded to provide replacements for the 113th. During the early summer it would remain in this four-division (110th, 113th, 160th, 222nd Rifle Divisions) configuration. In the planning for Western Front's summer offensive against the eastern face of the Rzhev salient at least one map-solution was prepared in June for a prospective offensive by 49th, 33rd and 5th Armies to seize Vyazma, although this came to nothing. As the planning continued 33rd Army was also considered for advances in the direction of Gzhatsk and west of Medyn. In the end the Army was to be given a large role in the offensive. When the Army joined the offensive on August 13 it had been reinforced with the 7th Guards Rifle Corps, two more divisions and four rifle brigades. It faced six German infantry regiments along the front line on its breakthrough sector but had only a 3.5:1 advantage in infantry and 1.6:1 in artillery, considerably less than the other Soviet armies involved, apart from 30th Army on the opposite end of the offensive front. Given this relative weakness in force correlation and the fact that the main offensive had begun more than a week earlier, eliminating any element of surprise, the attack of 33rd Army soon faltered.

The Army resumed its offensive on August 24 and made some penetrations on 3rd Panzer Army's front, but these were soon contained. Another effort began on September 4 in conjunction with 5th Army, but was halted three days later. During this period 20th Army was also attempting to reach Gzhatsk but went over to the defense on September 8. For the rest of the month the southern armies of the Front were officially engaged in "battles of local significance". From August 10 to September 15 the personnel losses of 33rd Army are listed as 42,327 killed, wounded and missing while gaining from 20 to 25 km to the west and northwest. The heavy losses were attributed to "densely-packed formations... [while] there was almost no coordination between fire and maneuver..." among other factors.

=== Operation Mars ===
In planning for the next offensive General Zhukov conceived a two-phase operation beginning against the northern part of the salient to be known as Operation Mars, with a subsequent phase to the south likely under the name of Operation Jupiter. During October and November the German 9th Army noted a Soviet buildup in the sector east of Vyazma, including the 3rd Tank Army, two tank corps, and reinforcements for 5th Army. 33rd Army would also take part. Due to postponements Mars did not begin until November 25, at which time the start date for the second phase was tentatively set for December 1. By then Mars was badly bogged down and although Zhukov continued to hope Jupiter could be implemented as late as December 9, on December 16 Stalin ordered the 3rd Tank Army to move south.

=== Rzhev-Vyasma Offensive ===
Operation Büffel. Note position of 33rd Army southeast of Vyasma ("Wjasma").

By the beginning of February 1943 the 33rd Army was still a powerful force of seven rifle divisions and two brigades. On February 17 Colonel Sedulin, who had been awarded the Order of the Red Banner for his leadership of the 160th, handed his command to Col. Ivan Ivanovich Oborin; Sedulin would go on to command the 324th and 8th Guards Divisions and later the 90th Rifle Corps. The strategic situation had changed significantly following the Soviet victory at Stalingrad and the subsequent exploitation on the southern half of the front. The current commander of Western Front, Col. Gen. I. S. Konev, was ordered to keep up pressure on Army Group Center to prevent its forces from being shifted to other sectors. A new offensive by 33rd Army aimed at Vyasma began on February 22 against the positions of German 4th Army northeast of Tyomkino involving the 5th Guards Rifle Division, 112th Rifle Brigade and elements of the 160th. It failed within hours. However, by now it was clear to the German High Command that the Rzhev salient could no longer be held and in fact on February 6 Hitler had authorized a withdrawal that was to begin on March 1.

=== Operation Büffel ===
The withdrawal caught the Red Army on the wrong foot and turned into a pursuit by stages despite its best efforts to cut off at least part of the German forces. Both sides were hindered by the spring rasputitsa, but 9th Army also conducted a relentless scorched-earth campaign, destroying towns and villages, roads and especially bridges. 33rd Army entered the pursuit on March 5, bypassing Tyomkino to the north in the direction of Vyasma, fighting over much of the same ground where it had been encircled a year earlier. On March 8 Colonel Oborin left the division to take up training duties; he was replaced by Col. Boleslav Frantsevich Zarako-Zarakovskii, who would be promoted to the rank of major general on September 1.

The combined forces of the 5th and 33rd Armies finally liberated the Vyasma region on March 12, with the 110th Rifle Division leading the 33rd into the city proper. The next day Col. Gen. V. D. Sokolovsky, who had replaced Konev as commander of Western Front, committed the 1st and 5th Tank Corps into the pursuit. Despite these reinforcements the Front soon ran into the extensive German defenses that had been built along the base of the salient. Beginning on March 18 shock groups of the 33rd, 49th and 50th Armies, totalling about eight rifle divisions and seven tank brigades, mounted a major attack at Spas-Demensk, but this expired on April 1 after heavy casualties owing to supply difficulties and heavy fortifications. The Rzhev-Vyasma Offensive was considered a victory and on June 19 the 1293rd Rifle Regiment was recognized for its part in it with the award the Order of the Red Banner.

== Into Western Russia ==
During the following months both sides took a much-needed breathing space to rebuild and replenish their forces in preparation for the summer offensives. The STAVKA chose to stand on the defensive in the Kursk region and absorb the attacks of 9th Army and 4th Panzer Army before going over to the counteroffensive. Western Front prepared for its own offensive in the direction of Smolensk and the 160th remained in 33rd Army, which was substantially reinforced with armor and artillery by the beginning of August.

=== Operation Suvorov ===
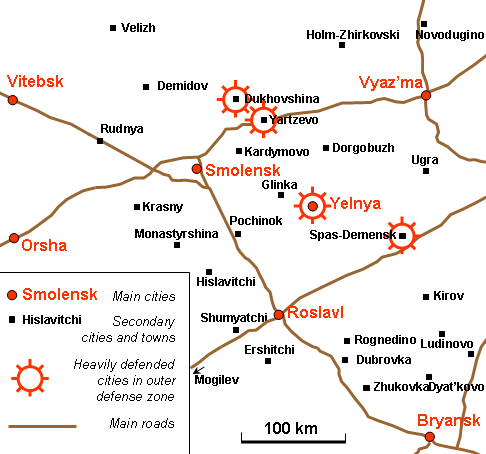
General layout of Smolensk region during the battle.

Operation Suvorov began on August 7. 33rd Army was still facing the defenses at the base of the former Rzhev salient (the Büffel-Stellung) east of Spas-Demensk. At this time its divisions averaged 6,500 - 7,000 personnel each (70 - 75 percent of their authorized strength). The Army commander, Lt. Gen. V. N. Gordov, formed his main shock group from the 42nd, 160th and 164th Rifle Divisions and the 256th Tank Brigade but these ran into tough resistance from the 480th Grenadier Regiment of the 260th Infantry Division in the Kurkino sector. Only the 164th achieved a limited success, taking the village of Chotilovka and threatening to drive a wedge between that German regiment and its neighboring 460th Grenadier Regiment until the 480th threw in its reserve battalion and stopped any further advance. By early afternoon the Front commander, Col. Gen. V. D. Sokolovskii was becoming frustrated about the inability of most his units to advance. The offensive resumed at 0730 hours on August 8 after a 30-minute artillery preparation, but 33rd Army made little further progress. It continued attacking on August 9–10 with the shock group on a very narrow front and made limited gains at the village of Sluzna, but was then stymied at Laski and Gubino; the intervention of an ersatz German battalion appears to have narrowly prevented a Soviet breakthrough. As both sides weakened the fighting continued into the morning of August 13 when the 42nd Division and the 256th Tanks were the first units of 33rd Army into Spas-Demensk. The 160th continued to advance into the void southwest of the town as German forces fell back to their next line of defense. Sokolovskii was forced to call a temporary halt on August 14 to replenish stocks, especially ammunition.

During this pause in operations the 160th was assigned to the 70th Rifle Corps, joining the 70th Rifle Division from 21st Army. Sokolovskii's revised plan put his Front's main effort in the center with the 21st, 33rd, 68th and 10th Guards Armies attacking the German XII Army Corps all along its front until it shattered, then push mobile groups through the gaps to liberate Yelnya. Virtually all the units on both sides were now well below authorized strength and Suvorov was becoming an endurance contest. Ammunition and fuel were still short on the Soviet side given the competing demands of other fronts.

At 0800 hours on August 28 the Western Front began a 90-minute artillery preparation across a 25 km-wide front southeast of Yelnya in the sectors of the 10th Guards, 21st and 33rd Armies. Instead of the obvious axis of advance straight up the railway to the city Sokolovskii decided to make his main effort in the 33rd Army sector near Novaya Berezovka. This assault struck the 20th Panzergrenadier Division directly, forcing it backward and away from its junction with the right flank of IX Army Corps. As soon as a gap was forced General Gordov committed the 5th Mechanized Corps at Koshelevo which began to shove wrecked German battlegroups out of its path. Overall the Army managed to advance as much as 8 km during the day. On August 29 the 5th Mechanized completed its breakthrough and Gordov was able to add the 6th Guards Cavalry Corps to the exploitation force. By 1330 hours on August 30 it became clear to the German command that Yelnya could not be held and orders for its evacuation were issued within minutes; the city was in Red Army hands by 1900. From here it was only 75 km to Smolensk. However, German 4th Army was able to establish a tenuous new front by September 3 and although Sokolovskii continued local attacks through the rest of the week his Front was again brought to a halt by logistical shortages.

As Western Front regrouped for the next round of the offensive the 160th and 70th Rifle Divisions were moved to 49th Army to form the 62nd Rifle Corps. This next round began on September 14. During the first days the 49th mounted powerful supporting attacks to assist Sokolovskii's main drive on Smolensk. This drive was forced to pause for several days, again due to supply shortages, but the city finally fell on September 25.The STAVKA was now eager for Sokolovskii to "bounce" the Panther Line and push on to Orsha.

=== Orsha Offensives ===
At the start of October the 160th was still in 62nd Rifle Corps as part of 49th Army, which consisted of just five rifle divisions plus one rifle and one tank brigade. As Western Front attempted to continue its offensive into eastern Belorussia in early October, forward elements of the Army reached the Pronya River late on October 2. The Corps led the advance north of Drybin with the 352nd, 277th and 344th Rifle Divisions in second echelon. The strong German defenses in this region, manned by their 342nd and 35th Infantry Divisions, along with the weakness of his Army after months of offensive combat, convinced the Army commander, Col. Gen. I. T. Grishin that any further offensive action would be futile.

Beginning on October 12, Western Front began a new offensive towards Orsha. This was preceded by a complex regrouping of forces, in which 33rd Army was moved into the sector north and south of Lenino. In response, 49th Army's forces shifted north into the positions vacated by 33rd Army. This assault, which did not directly involve 49th Army, began on October 12 but collapsed after less than a week with only limited gains on a few sectors. During November the 160th and 70th Divisions were assigned, with the 344th Division, to the 113th Rifle Corps, still in 49th Army. In December the 160th was again reassigned, now to the 10th Army in Western Front where it served as a separate rifle division.

=== Into Belarus ===
This move brought the division to the south flank of the Front, adjacent to Army Gen. K. K. Rokossovsky's Belorussian Front. Rokossovsky was planning a new offensive with his 3rd and 50th Armies in the direction of Bykhov which would be supported by 10th Army attacking south of Chausy and along the Pronya. According to the plan the 10th conducted this diversionary assault beginning at dawn on January 3, 1944. The 290th Rifle Division, supported by most of the 160th and 76th Rifle Divisions, pushed across the Pronya between Putki and Skvarsk, 10–15 km north of Chausy. In heavy fighting the three divisions seized bridgeheads north and south of the fortified village of Prilepovka but were not able to take the village itself. Overnight the bridgeheads were reinforced by elements of the 385th Rifle Division and the next day the combined force took the village of Baryshevka, 2 km north of Prilepovka, as well as Putki, but was then halted at the outskirts of Voskhod, 5 km to the west, by counterattacking reserves of the 35th Infantry Division. Further efforts stalled, but a valuable bridgehead over the Pronya had been won in two days of fighting.

On February 1 the 160th was removed to the Reserve of the Supreme High Command for much-needed rebuilding and replenishment. When it returned to the fighting on March 1 it was assigned as a separate division in 47th Army of the first formation of 2nd Belorussian Front. This Front had been created from Belorussian Front to take control of the long but relatively inactive front line south of the Pripet marshes. Later in the month the division was again reassigned, now to the tiny 70th Army of only four divisions, joining 76th Guards Rifle Division in the 114th Rifle Corps. It would remain under these commands almost continually for the duration of the war.

== Operation Bagration ==
On May 5 General Zarako-Zarakovskii left the division; he would later serve as the deputy chief-of-staff of the 1st Belorussian Front before being transferred to the Polish People's Army. He was replaced the next day by Maj. Gen. Nikolai Sergeevich Timofeev. By this time Western Front had been disbanded, replaced by 3rd Belorussian and the second formation of 2nd Belorussian Front, and the former 2nd Belorussian had been reincorporated as the left (western) wing of 1st Belorussian Front. In the planning for Operation Bagration this wing would play a minor role in the initial phase of the offensive, mostly tying down the forces of German 2nd Army.

=== Lublin–Brest Offensive ===
The turn of the left wing came on July 17. 70th Army was still small, with just 29,054 personnel guarding an attack front of largely impassable terrain 120 km-wide. Its divisions, including the 160th, were noted as being at just over 86 percent of authorized strength. The offensive was delayed as the 8th Guards Army redeployed from its previous positions along the lower Dniestr River. As that Army took up its positions the 70th regrouped to its own left flank and center. This brought the main forces of the two Corps of the Army to jumping-off positions along a 20 km-wide sector. Developing the success of the adjacent 61st Army the 114th Corps attacked in the morning in the direction of Rechytsa and Divin and, having broken the resistance of the Hungarian 12th Reserve Division, by the close of July 18 had reached a line from Lelikov to Duby to Zamoshye.

At 0530 hours that morning, following a 30-minute artillery preparation, the forward battalions and regiments of the main forces of the left wing attacked and soon determined that the German forces had withdrawn their main formations and intended to occupy their next defensive line the following night. These forward detachments occupied the first, and in some places the second trench line in the first 90 minutes. The rapid arrival of the Front's main shock group at this second defensive zone prevented the Axis forces from occupying it in an organized manner and were therefore forced to withdraw to the Western Bug River along many sectors. To the right 70th Army attacked on July 19 toward Zabolotye and Lyubokhiny and with its right flank took up a pursuit to the west in the direction of Brest. In recognition of its leading role in breaking through the German defense west of Kovel the 160th would be awarded the Order of the Red Banner on August 9.

By now the left wing of 1st Belorussian Front had penetrated the Axis defense up to 40 km in depth and 120 km in breadth; 70th Army was averaging 16–20 km per day. All of this created favorable conditions to develop the offensive into the operational depth. On July 20 the Army, encountering insignificant resistance, captured the towns of Malaryta, Krymno and Shatsk as its secondary forces joined the advance. The 28th and 70th Armies, along with the 9th Guards Rifle Corps, were now assigned the task of liberating Brest. By the end of July 23 the 70th had advanced up to another 45 km in the direction of Sławatycze. During the following days the Army moved forward more slowly, facing counterattacks from newly arrived German reserves and breaking through the first positions of the Brest fortified area. On July 27 the Army, attacking to the north of the city, reached the Western Bug along a broad front and helped complete the encirclement of part of the German grouping around Brest. The city was taken the next day and both the division and one of its rifle regiments received the name of that place as an honorific:

BREST... 160th Rifle Division (Maj. Gen. Timofeev, Nikolai Sergeevich)... 1293rd Rifle Regiment (Maj. Repetskii, Sergei Ivanovich)... The troops who participated in the liberation of Brest, by the order of the Supreme High Command of 28 July 1944, and a commendation in Moscow, are given a salute of 20 artillery salvoes from 224 guns.

On August 10 the 1295th Rifle Regiment would receive the Order of the Red Banner for its part in this victory.

By this time the overall Bagration offensive was running down due to logistics. The Front was able to seize bridgeheads over the Vistula north and south of Warsaw before it ground to a halt in the first days of August. By the beginning of September the 160th had been transferred to the 96th Rifle Corps, still in 70th Army, but a month later it was back in 114th Corps. On November 17 Rokossovsky was transferred to command of the second formation of 2nd Belorussian Front and two days later that Front was reinforced with the 70th and 65th Armies from his former command. The 160th would remain in this Front for the duration. 70th Army was deployed to the Tłuszcz area to serve as the Front reserve.

== Vistula-Oder Offensive ==
Prior to the start of this offensive the 70th Army was substantially reinforced and now contained nine rifle divisions organized in three corps. It was located in the Serock bridgehead with the 96th Corps deployed in a single echelon between Guty and Ciepielin and one division of 47th Rifle Corps also in the front line. The 114th Corps was in the Army's second echelon in the area northeast of Serock. The Army's task was to attack on a 3 km-wide front in the direction of Nasielsk on the first day, outflank Modlin from the north and then drive west to help prevent the German Warsaw grouping from retreating behind the Vistula. The 114th Corps would remain in reserve in the initial phase.

2nd Belorussian Front began its offensive on the morning of January 14, 1945. On January 17 the 70th Army made a fighting advance of up to 14 km against sagging resistance, forced the Wkra and began fighting for the eastern and southeastern outskirts of Modlin. The 114th Corps was now committed from behind the Army's right flank, although one of its divisions remained in second echelon. The following day, after stubborn fighting, the Army secured both the town and fortress. The Front's objective was now to reach the mouth of the Vistula and the Baltic coast, thus cutting off the German forces in East Prussia.

During the last week of January the Army seized a bridgehead over the lower Vistula between Fordon and Chełmno and was fighting to widen it while also blockading the German garrison of Toruń. The latter city was understood to contain 3,000 - 4,000 German troops and one division plus a regiment of the 47th Corps was considered sufficient to contain it on this sector. In fact it contained 30,000 men and on the night of January 30/31 the garrison attempted to break out to the northwest. During the following week nearly all the forces of 70th Army, including the 160th, were involved in containing and eventually eliminating this breakout which was completed on February 8; only small groups succeeded in escaping to the west.

=== East Pomeranian Offensive ===
The next phase of the offensive began on February 10. By this time the 1st Belorussian Front had reached the Oder River and appeared poised to advance on Berlin but the STAVKA was concerned about the potential of German counteroffensive action driving south from Pomerania and ordered Rokossovsky to complete the isolation of East Prussia and eliminate this flank threat. Prior to the start the 114th Corps was transferred to 65th Army which was also in the Vistula bridgehead south of Chełmno. This Army was tasked with continuing the offensive toward the northwest to reach a line from Hoch Stablau to Czersk by February 14 before continuing toward Bytów. On the first day the 65th, 70th and 49th Armies advanced 5–10 km. Over the following days the 70th maintained this momentum but the 65th and 49th were faced with difficult lake and forest terrain and managed only 15–20 km up until the 14th. As the advance continued it met increasing resistance and the 160th, along with the rest of the Front's forces, was becoming worn down by more than a month of continuous offensive fighting. From February 19 the operation essentially stopped along a line including Czersk.

Over the following days the Front regrouped and was reinforced. The 114th Rifle Corps was reassigned to 49th Army which was occupying a line from Schwartzwasser to Osowo to Rittel. The renewed offensive began on February 24 and over the following week the 70th and 19th Armies made the greatest progress toward the objectives. In order to strengthen the advance, on March 2 Rokossovsky ordered the 114th Corps, now consisting of the 160th and the 76th Guards, back to 70th Army to be concentrated near Chojnice as the 49th Army went over to the defense. The division would remain in 70th Army for the duration. At this point the surviving forces of German 2nd Army began pulling back toward Gdynia and Gdańsk.

In the third stage of the operation the left-wing forces of the Front advanced on the latter city with the objective of occupying it by March 20. 70th Army was backed by the 8th Mechanized Corps. On March 10 it made a fighting advance of 30 km, aiming to reach the coast at Kolibken. The advance continued and on March 23 the Army, with the help of flanking forces of other armies, broke through the German defenses, captured the town of Sopot and reached the shore of Gdańsk Bay. 114th Corps, working with the 3rd Guards Tank Corps, continued to attack to the south toward Oliwa. In the course of the next five days the 160th and its Corps assisted 19th Army in the liberation of Gdańsk, and two of its subunits would be recognized with honorifics:

GDANSK... 1295th Rifle Regiment (Lt. Col. Levchenko, Vasilii Markovich)... 462nd Sapper Battalion (Maj. Krutikov, Igor Viktorovich)... The troops who participated in the liberation of Gdańsk, by the order of the Supreme High Command of 30 March 1945, and a commendation in Moscow, are given a salute of 20 artillery salvoes from 224 guns.

2nd Belorussian Front would now redeploy to the lower Oder for the final assault into central Germany.

== Berlin Operation ==
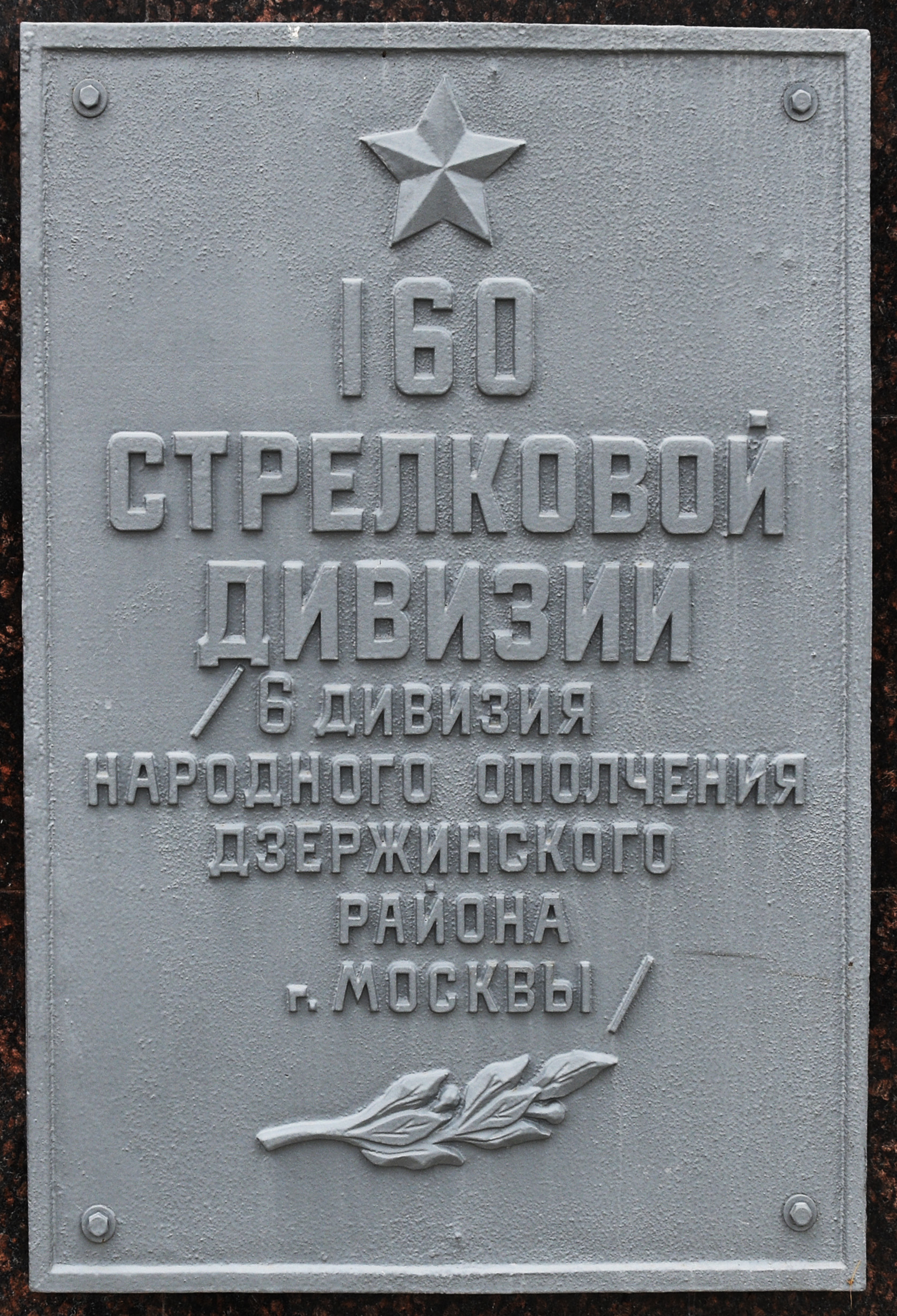
Memorial plaque to the 160th/6th Moscow Militia placed at Borovsk in recognition of its liberation on January 4, 1942

70th Army was one of the three combined-arms armies in the Front that helped form its shock group at the start of the assault on Berlin. At this time the 160th had somewhere between 3,600 and 4,800 personnel on strength. The Army was deployed along a 14 km front, but the breakthrough sector was 4 km wide along the West Oder River in the area of Mescherin. All three divisions of 114th Corps (1st, 160th, 76th Guards) were on the main attack axis but in second echelon behind four divisions of the 47th and 96th Rifle Corps. 3rd Guards Tank Corps was subordinated to 70th Army for the operation. During April 18–19 the Front launched intensive reconnaissance efforts in preparation for the crossings, including the elimination of German advance parties in the lowlands between the East and West Oder. Over these two days the Army's first echelon took up positions on the east bank of the West Oder, and at one location had managed to create a small bridgehead on the west bank.

The Front's full offensive began on April 20. During April 24 the 114th Corps crossed to the west bank of the West Oder in order to further develop the Army's success, concentrating in the Mescherin area and to the north. 3rd Guards Tanks began its own crossing at 1700 hours. 114th Corps was committed into the fighting the following day in the Army's center and reached the eastern bank of the Randow River's flood plain along a sector from Grunz to west of Wartin. On the same day Col. Yusif Mirza oglu Abdullayev took over command of the 160th after General Timofeev fell ill; this officer had previously commanded the 38th Guards Rifle Division and had briefly served as deputy commander of the 114th Corps. He would continue in command until the division was disbanded.

70th Army resumed its offensive on the morning of April 26 and forced a crossing of the Randow, which was the basis of the German second defensive zone, along its entire front. It then advanced 6–8 km farther. On the following day, with the backing of 3rd Guards Tanks, the Army advanced flat-out to the west, covering as much as 30 km. Through the period from April 28 to May 5 the further advance was only opposed by small covering detachments seeking in any way to slow down the offensive. On May 3 contact was made with British Second Army east of Wismar and the next day reached the Baltic in the Warnemunde sector, where the 160th ended the war.

== Postwar ==
The division ended the war with the full title of 160th Rifle, Brest, Order of the Red Banner Division. (Russian: 160-я стрелковая Брестская Краснознамённая дивизия.) In a final round of awards on May 17 the 973rd Artillery Regiment received the Order of the Red Banner, the 1297th Rifle Regiment was presented with the Order of Kutuzov, 2nd Degree, while the 547th Signal Battalion was given the Order of the Red Star, all for their roles in the fighting for Gdańsk. As directed by STAVKA Order No. 11097, part 6, of May 29 the division was to be transferred to the control of 1st Belorussian Front by June 3. It was disbanded under that command later that month.
