= Leosia =

Village in Kociewie

- Hamlet
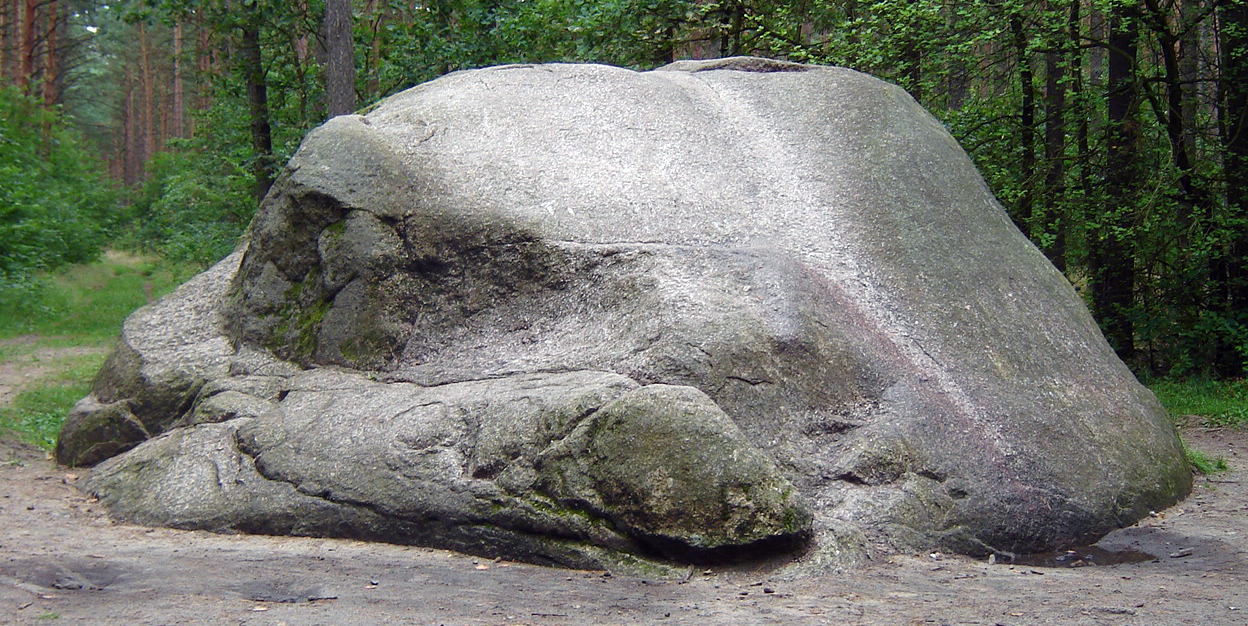
- A photograph of Adalbert of Prague's Stone, a glacial erratic located within the vicinity of the settlement

- Location within Poland
- Coordinates: 53°29′10″N 18°23′14″E
- Country: Poland
- Voivodeship: Kuyavian-Pomeranian
- County: Świecie
- Gmina: Drzycim
- Population: 12

Leosia [lɛˈɔɕa] is a hamlet in the administrative district of Gmina Drzycim, within Świecie County, Kuyavian-Pomeranian Voivodeship, in north-central Poland.
