= Spławie, Kuyavian-Pomeranian Voivodeship =

Settlement in Kociewie

Spławie
- Hamlet
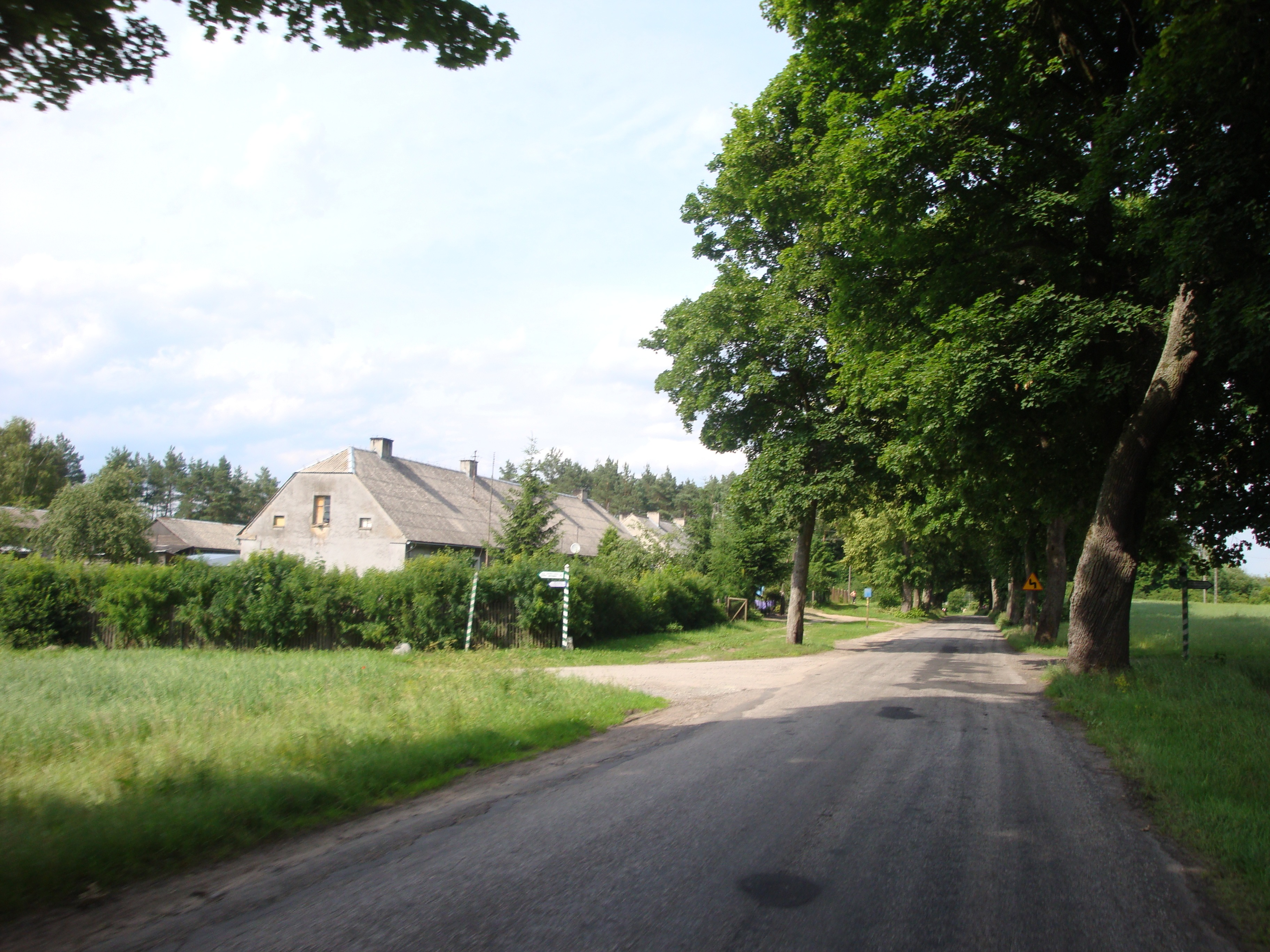
- Southernmost part of the settlement

- Location within Poland
- Coordinates: 53°33′27″N 18°21′40″E
- Country: Poland
- Voivodeship: Kuyavian-Pomeranian
- County: Świecie
- Gmina: Drzycim
- Population: 33

Spławie [ˈspwavjɛ] is a hamlet in the administrative district of Gmina Drzycim, within Świecie County, Kuyavian-Pomeranian Voivodeship, in north-central Poland.
