= Bedlenki =

Village in Kuyavian-Pomeranian Voivodeship, Poland

- Hamlet
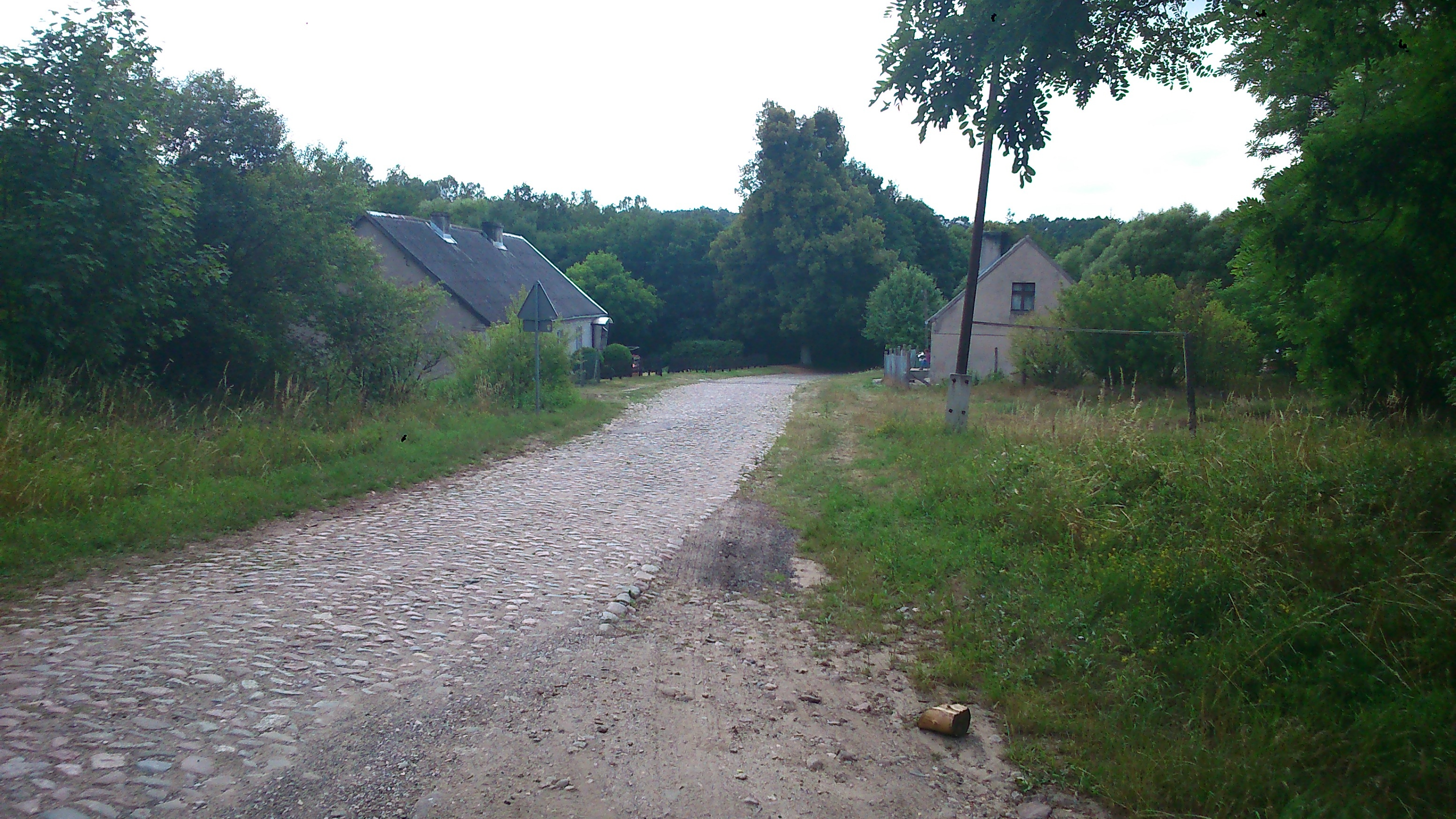

- Location within Poland
- Coordinates: 53°27′59″N 18°23′46″E
- Country: Poland
- Voivodeship: Kuyavian-Pomeranian
- County: Świecie
- Gmina: Drzycim

Population
  - Total: 30
- Time zone: UTC+1 (CET)
  - Summer (DST): UTC+2 (CEST)
- Vehicle registration: CSW

Bedlenki [bɛˈdlɛŋki] is a hamlet in the administrative district of Gmina Drzycim, within Świecie County, Kuyavian-Pomeranian Voivodeship, in north-central Poland. It is located within the ethnocultural region of Kociewie in the historic region of Pomerania.
