= Krakówek =

Village in Kociewie

- Village
- Location within Poland
- Coordinates: 53°29′57″N 18°17′8″E
- Country: Poland
- Voivodeship: Kuyavian-Pomeranian
- County: Świecie
- Gmina: Drzycim

Krakówek [kraˈkuvɛk] is a village in the administrative district of Gmina Drzycim, within Świecie County, Kuyavian-Pomeranian Voivodeship, in north-central Poland.
