= Lubocheń =

Village in Kociewie

- Hamlet
- Location within Poland
- Coordinates: 53°28′51″N 18°21′16″E
- Country: Poland
- Voivodeship: Kuyavian-Pomeranian
- County: Świecie
- Gmina: Drzycim

Lubocheń [luˈbɔxɛɲ] is a hamlet in the administrative district of Gmina Drzycim, within Świecie County, Kuyavian-Pomeranian Voivodeship, in north-central Poland.
