= Kaliska, Świecie County =

Village in Kociewie

Kaliska
- Hamlet
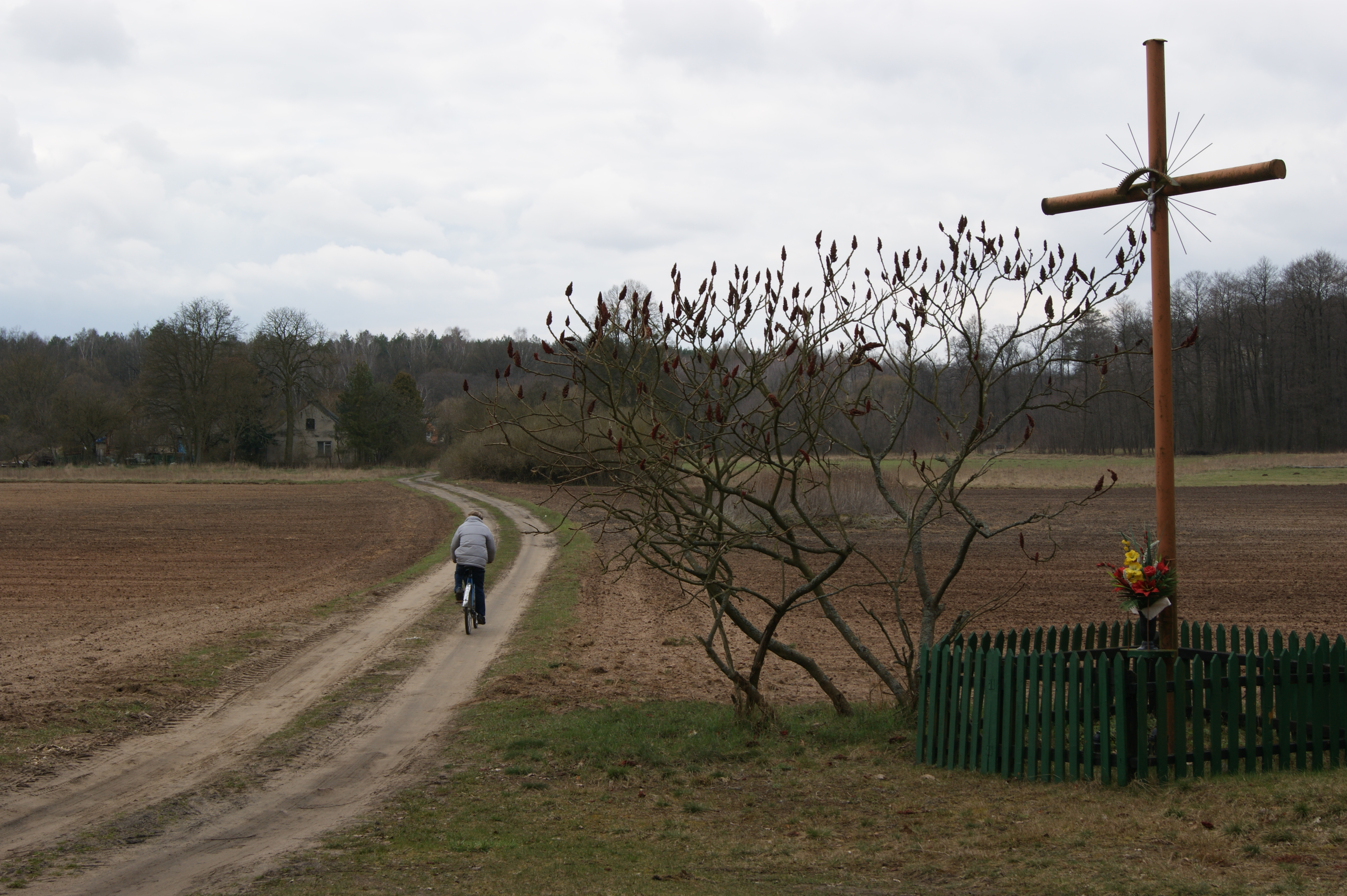
- A wayside cross nearby the settlement

- Location within Poland
- Coordinates: 53°29′37″N 18°22′58″E
- Country: Poland
- Voivodeship: Kuyavian-Pomeranian
- County: Świecie
- Gmina: Drzycim
- Population: 12

Kaliska [kaˈliska] is a hamlet in the administrative district of Gmina Drzycim, within Świecie County, Kuyavian-Pomeranian Voivodeship, in north-central Poland.
