= Wery, Kuyavian-Pomeranian Voivodeship =

Village in Kociewie

Wery
- Village
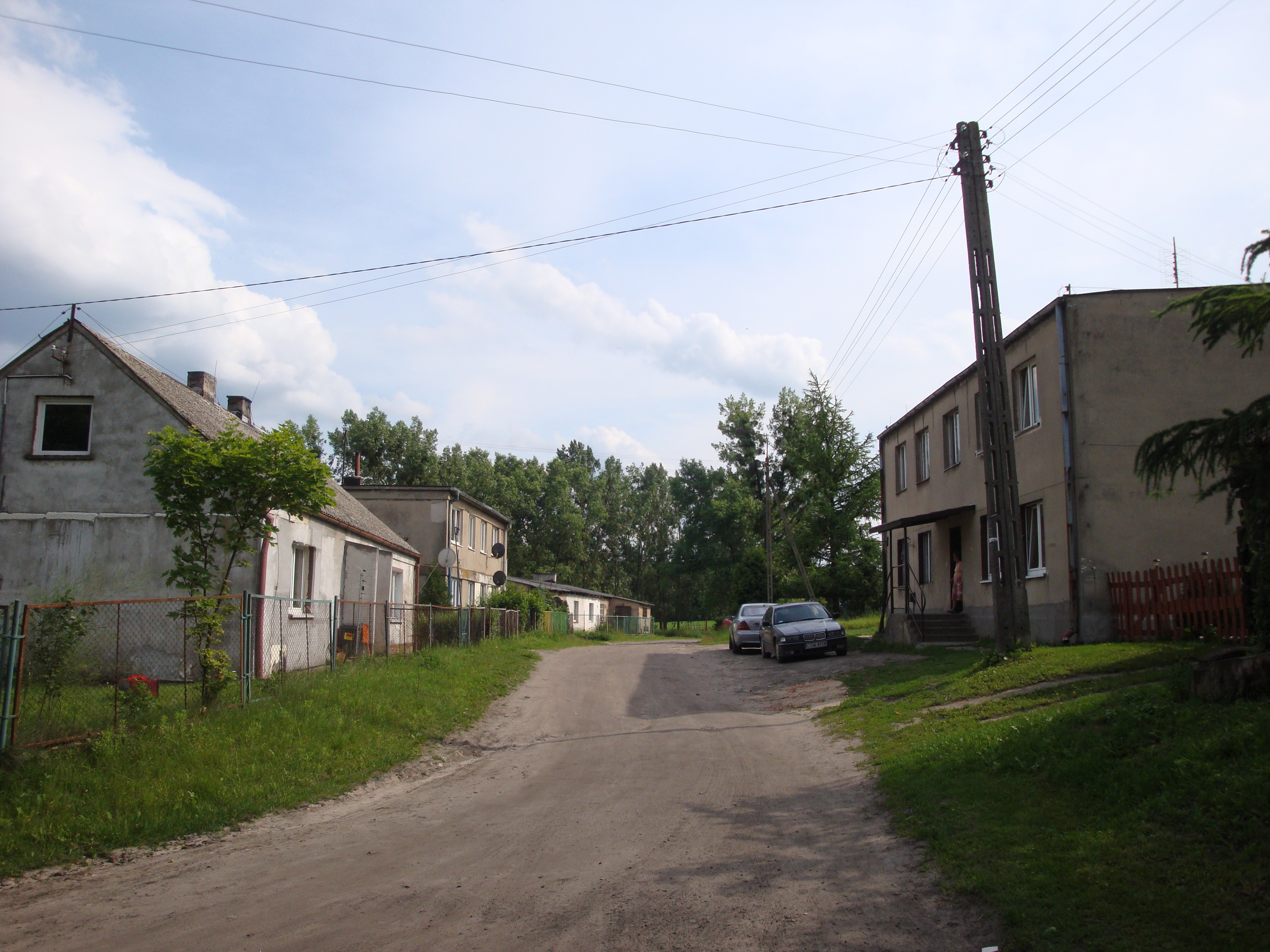

- Location within Poland
- Coordinates: 53°31′59″N 18°19′59″E
- Country: Poland
- Voivodeship: Kuyavian-Pomeranian
- County: Świecie
- Gmina: Drzycim

Wery [ˈvɛrɨ] is a village in the administrative district of Gmina Drzycim, within Świecie County, Kuyavian-Pomeranian Voivodeship, in north-central Poland.
