= Jastrzębie, Świecie County =

Village in Kociewie

Jastrzębie
- Village
- Location within Poland
- Coordinates: 53°32′N 18°16′E
- Country: Poland
- Voivodeship: Kuyavian-Pomeranian
- County: Świecie
- Gmina: Drzycim
- Time zone: UTC+1 (CET)
  - Summer (DST): UTC+2 (CEST)
- Vehicle registration: CSW

Jastrzębie [jasˈtʂɛmbjɛ] is a village in the administrative district of Gmina Drzycim, within Świecie County, Kuyavian-Pomeranian Voivodeship, in north-central Poland.

== History ==
Jastrzębie was a private village of the Świnoleski noble family, administratively located in the Świecie County in the Pomeranian Voivodeship of the Kingdom of Poland. It was annexed by Prussia in the First Partition of Poland in 1772. Following World War I, Poland regained independence and control of the village.

During the German occupation of Poland (World War II), in January 1940, the German Selbstschutz carried out a massacre of dozens of Poles in the forest near Jastrzębie.
