= Gródek, Kuyavian-Pomeranian Voivodeship =

Village in Kociewie

Gródek
- Village
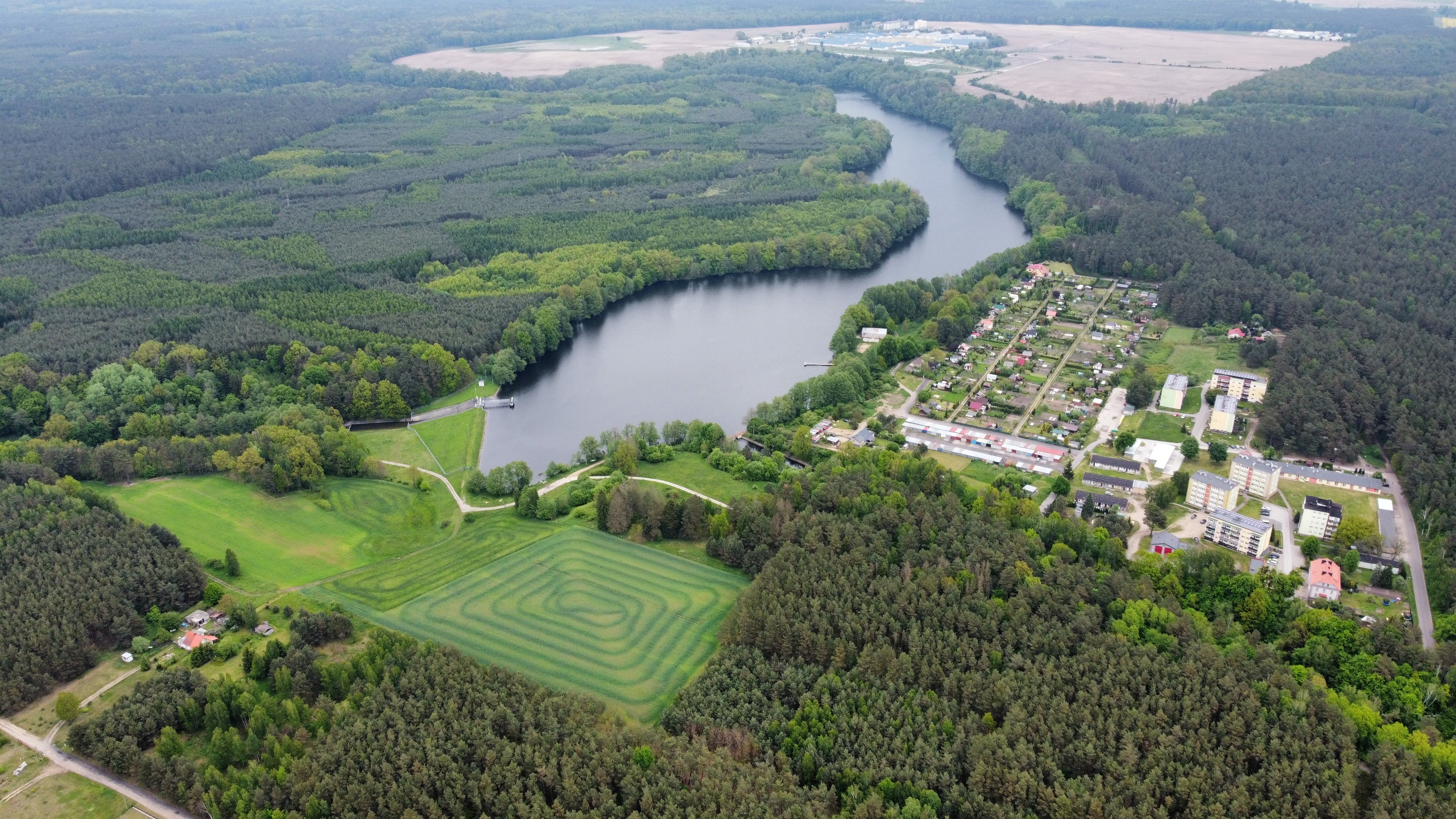

- Location within Poland
- Coordinates: 53°30′1″N 18°21′32″E
- Country: Poland
- Voivodeship: Kuyavian-Pomeranian
- County: Świecie
- Gmina: Drzycim
- Population: 1,200

Gródek [ˈɡrudɛk] is a village in the administrative district of Gmina Drzycim, within Świecie County, Kuyavian-Pomeranian Voivodeship, in north-central Poland.

The river Wda, with a hydroelectric plant, runs through the village.
