= Sierosław, Kuyavian-Pomeranian Voivodeship =

Village in Kociewie

Sierosław
- Village
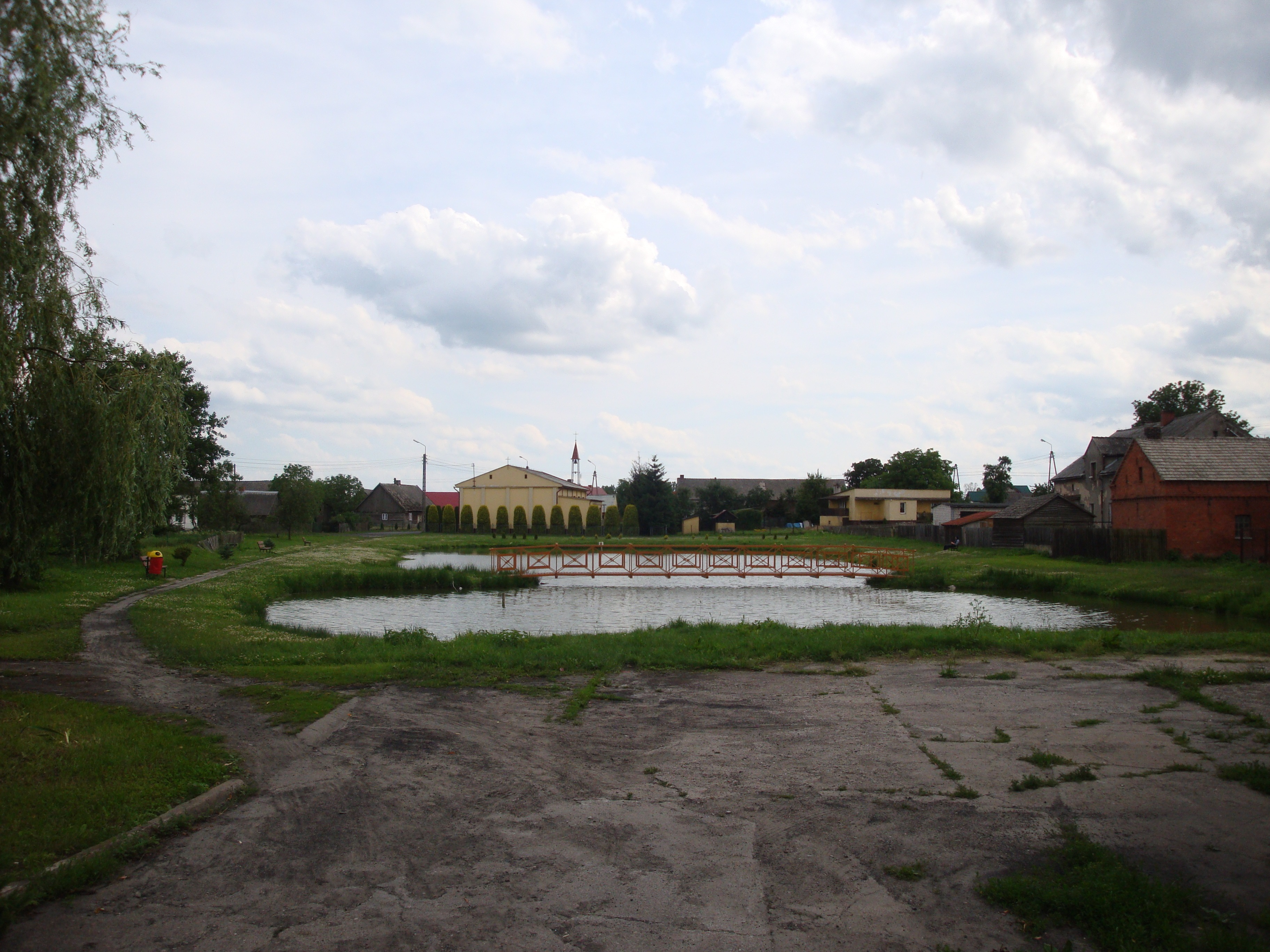
- View of the village pond

- Location within Poland
- Coordinates: 53°33′N 18°17′E
- Country: Poland
- Voivodeship: Kuyavian-Pomeranian
- County: Świecie
- Gmina: Drzycim

Sierosław [ɕɛˈrɔswaf] is a village in the administrative district of Gmina Drzycim, within Świecie County, Kuyavian-Pomeranian Voivodeship, in north-central Poland.
