= Sominy =

- Village
- Location within Poland
- Coordinates: 54°02′13″N 17°38′21″E
- Country: Poland
- Voivodeship: Pomeranian
- County: Bytów
- Gmina: Studzienice
- Population: 306

Sominy [sɔˈminɨ] is a village in Gmina Studzienice, Bytów County, Pomeranian Voivodeship, in northern Poland.

From 1975 to 1998 the village was in Słupsk Voivodeship.
