= Kreis Schwetz =

District of Prussia

- District of Prussia
- 1818–1920
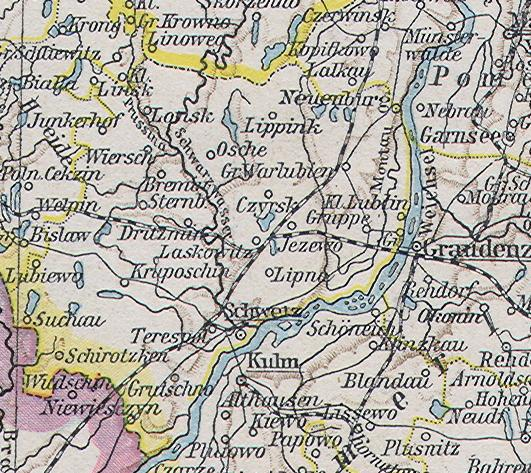
- Map of the district by Richard Andree, 1890
- Capital: Schwetz (Świecie)
- History
  - Established: 1818
  - Disestablished: 1920
- Today part of: Poland

Kreis Schwetz was a Prussian district that existed from 1818 to 1920, with its capital at Schwetz. The district was located on the western bank of the Vistula river in the part of West Prussia that fell to Poland after the First World War through the Treaty of Versailles in 1920.

== History ==
The area of the Schwetz district belonged to the medieval Kingdom of Poland, then the State of the Teutonic Order since 1309 until 1454/1466, and then the Kingdom of Poland again.

The area of the Schwetz district became part of the Kingdom of Prussia with the First Partition of Poland in 1772 and belonged to the Konitz district until 1818. In 1815, the area became part of Regierungsbezirk Marienwerder in the province of West Prussia. As part of a comprehensive district reform, the new Schwetz district was formed on April 1, 1818, with its capital at Schwetz. With the signing of the Treaty of Versailles after World War I, the Schwetz district had to be ceded by Germany to Poland on January 10, 1920.

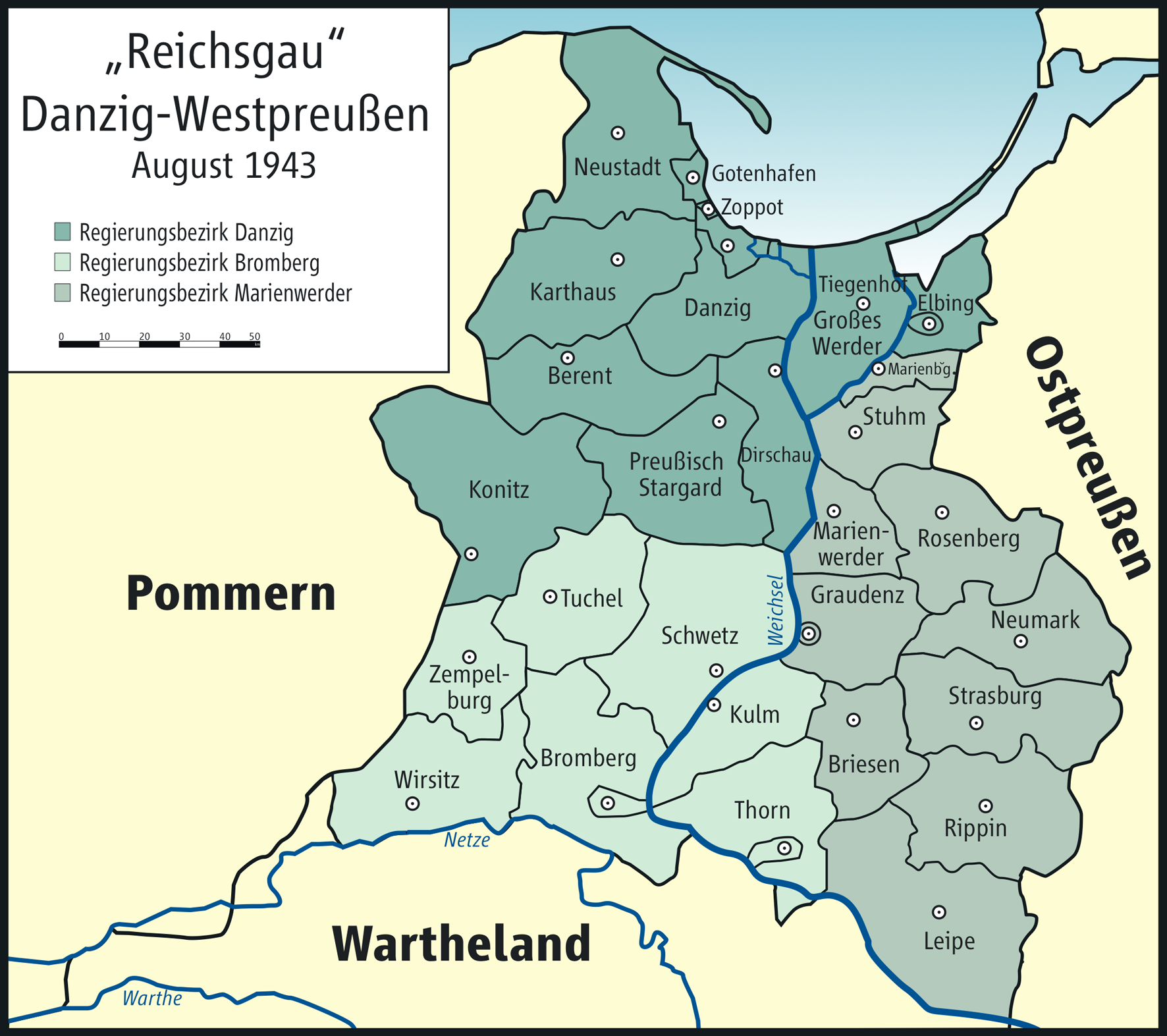
Danzig-West Prussia (1943)

After the invasion of Poland in 1939 and the annexation of the territory by Nazi Germany, the district became part of the new Regierungsbezirk Bromberg in Reichsgau Danzig-West Prussia. Grupa, Mniszek and Świecie were the sites of large massacres of Poles from the district, carried out by the Germans as part of the Intelligenzaktion. Local Poles were also subjected to expulsions. Towards the end of World War II, the district was occupied by the Red Army in the spring of 1945 and was restored to Poland.

== Demographics ==
The district of Schwetz had a mixed population of Germans and Poles.

Ethnolinguistic distribution of population in the Schwetz district
Year	1837		1855		1861		1900		1910	
German (includes local Jews)	25,673	57.5%	32,722	54.1%	34,648	53.3%	37,021	44.7%	42,233	47.1%
Polish / Bilingual / Other	18,977	42.5%	27,784	45.9%	30,310	46.7%	45,754	55.3%	47,479	52.9%
Total	44,650		60,506		64,958		82,775		89,712	

== Politics ==
=== District administrators ===
- 1827–1829: Sartorius von Schwanenfeld
- 1829–1850: Raimund von Pape
- 1850–1867: Richard Wegner
- 1867–1870: Hans von Zedlitz-Leipe
- 1870–1874: Wilhelm Woldeck von Arneburg
- 1874–1897: Gustav Gerlich
- 1897–1903: Hans Grashoff
- 1903–1916: Gustav Adolf von Halem
- 1916–1919: Friedrich Frankenbach
- 1919–1920: Werner Zschintzsch

=== Reichstag elections ===
In the German Empire, the Schwetz district formed the Marienwerder 5 Reichstag constituency. In all Reichstag elections, this constituency was closely contested between German and Polish candidates. The respective winners only prevailed with narrow majorities:

- 1871: Gustav Gerlich, National Liberal Party
- 1874: Erazm Parczewski, Polish Party
- 1877: Franz August von Gordon, German Conservative Party
- 1878: Franz August von Gordon, German Conservative Party
- 1881: Boleslaw von Kossowski, Polish Party
- 1884: Franz August von Gordon, German Conservative Party
- 1887: Otto Holtz, Free Conservative Party
- 1890: Otto Holtz, Free Conservative Party
- 1893: Otto Holtz, Free Conservative Party
- 1898: Otto Holtz, Free Conservative Party
- 1903: Otto Holtz, Free Conservative Party
- 1907: Julian von Saß-Jaworski, Polish Party
- 1912: Gustav Adolf von Halem, Free Conservative Party

== Municipalities ==
In 1912, the Schwetz district included the two towns of Neuenburg in Westpreußen and Schwetz, as well as 151 rural communities:

- Adlig Salesche
- Alt Jasnitz
- Alt Marsau
- Altfließ
- Andreasthal
- Bagniewo
- Bechau
- Biechowo
- Blondzmin
- Brachlin
- Branitz
- Brattwin
- Bresin
- Briesen
- Bukowitz
- Buschin
- Butzig
- Christfelde
- Czemnik-Wenglarken
- Deutsch Lonk
- Deutsch Westphalen
- Dragaß
- Dritschmin
- Drosdowo
- Dubelno
- Dulzig
- Ehrenthal
- Eibenhorst
- Eichenhorst
- Espenhöhe
- Espenwerder
- Flötenau
- Franzdorf
- Friedrichsdank
- Fünfmorgen
- Gatzki
- Gellen
- Gellenhütte
- Grabowko
- Groddeck
- Groß Deutsch Konopath
- Groß Kommorsk, Bauerndorf
- Groß Kommorsk, Käthnerdorf
- Groß Lonk
- Groß Lubin
- Groß Plochotschin
- Groß Sanskau
- Groß Sibsau
- Groß Westphalen
- Groß Zappeln
- Gruppe
- Grutschno
- Hardenberg
- Hasenau
- Heinrichsdorf
- Helenenfelde
- Hilmarsdorf
- Jeschewo
- Jeziorken
- Johannisberg
- Julienfelde
- Julienhof
- Jungen
- Jungensand
- Junkerhof
- Karlshorst
- Klein Deutsch Konopath
- Klein Kommorsk
- Klein Lubin
- Klein Plochotschin
- Klein Sanskau
- Klein Sibsau
- Klein Taschau
- Klein Zappeln
- Kommerau
- Königlich Glugowko
- Königlich Salesche
- Königsdank
- Konschütz
- Korritowo
- Koselitz
- Kossowo
- Kranichsfelde
- Kruposchin
- Krusch
- Kurland
- Laski
- Laskowitz Bahnhof
- Lianno
- Lichtenhain
- Liedkesfelde
- Linsk
- Lipnitz
- Lippink
- Lonsk
- Lonskipietz
- Lowinneck
- Lubau
- Lubiewo
- Lubsee
- Ludwigsthal
- Luschkowo
- Maleschechowo
- Michelau
- Miedzno
- Mischke
- Montau
- Mukrz
- Neu Jaschinnitz
- Neu Klunkwitz
- Neu Marsau
- Neuenburg in Westpreußen, town
- Neunhuben
- Neusaß-Treul
- Nieder Sartowitz
- Niedwitz
- Osche
- Oslowo
- Prust
- Richlawo
- Roschanno
- Rudtken
- Sadrosch
- Sandberg
- Schellenschin
- Schiroslaw
- Schirotzken
- Schönau
- Schwekatowo
- Schwetz, town
- Sdroje
- Skrzinken
- Skurzejewo
- Sprindt
- Suchau
- Suchom
- Sullnowko
- Taschauerfelde
- Topolinken
- Topollno
- Trempel
- Treul
- Tuschin
- Udschitz
- Unterberg
- Waldau
- Warlubien
- Weide
- Wentfin
- Wiersch
- Wilhelmsmark
- Wintersdorf
- Zielonka
