= Margarete Bieber =

German-American art historian (1879–1978)

- Born: 31 July 1879; Schönau, Kreis Schwetz, West Prussia, German Empire
- Died: 25 February 1978 (aged 98); New Canaan, Connecticut, United States
- Education: University of Berlin, University of Bonn
- Occupations: Art historian, professor

Margarete Bieber (31 July 1879 – 25 February 1978) was a Jewish German-American art historian, classical archaeologist and professor. She became the second woman university professor in Germany in 1919 when she took a position at the University of Giessen. She studied the theatre of ancient Greece and Rome as well as the sculpture and clothing in ancient Rome and Greece.

Bieber left Germany after the Nazis seized power and she made her way to the United States where she taught at Barnard College, Columbia University and Princeton University. She published hundreds of works during her career and authored definitive works in four areas of study: the Greek and Roman theater, Hellenistic sculpture, ancient dress, and Roman copies of Greek art. She emphasised that Roman reproductions of Greek originals were essentially Roman works and carried the stamp of Roman civilization.

== Biography ==
=== Early life and education ===
Bieber was born on 31 July 1879 in Schönau, Kreis Schwetz (present day Przechowo, Poland) to Jewish parents — Valli Bukofzer, and Jacob Heinrich Bieber, a factory owner. She attended a girls' school in Schwetz (present day Świecie) for six years before being sent to a finishing school in Dresden.

In 1899 she went to Berlin where she attended Gymnasialkurse, a private school founded by Helene Lange. In 1901 she passed the Maturitätsprüfung in Thorn and registered at the University of Berlin. As women were not allowed to enroll, she audited her classes, attending lectures by Hermann Alexander Diels, Reinhard Kekulé von Stradonitz and Ulrich von Wilamowitz-Moellendorff. She graduated in the winter semester 1901/02 in Berlin. In 1904 she moved to Bonn, studying under Paul Clemen, Georg Loeschcke and Franz Bücheler. She received her PhD from the University of Bonn in 1907, her dissertation concerning representations of ancient Greek costume in art.

=== Research and professorship ===
In the following years, Bieber did extensive research throughout the Mediterranean. She was the first woman to receive a travel grant from the German Archaeological Institute (DAI) in 1909. From then until 1914, she did research in Athens and later Rome. She became a member of the DAI in 1913. When the First World War broke out, Bieber returned to Germany and worked as a Red Cross worker. From Easter 1915, she taught seminars and ran the Archaeological Institute at the University of Berlin for her former instructor Georg Loeschcke, who was ill. After he died in November 1915, a successor was appointed and she was not allowed to continue teaching as women could not receive habilitation at the time. Bieber continued to teach private courses out of her home, counting Dora and Erwin Panofsky among her students.

After several unsuccessful attempts, her postdoctoral was finally approved in 1919 and she became an associate professor in classical archaeology at the University of Giessen. She was the second woman to become a University professor in Germany. Beginning in 1928, she headed the Giessen Institute of Archaeology and in 1931, she was made a full professor. Her future looking secure, she adopted a six-year-old girl named Ingeborg in 1932. After the Nazis seized power in Germany, they removed Jewish people from academic positions and Bieber was removed from her professorship in July 1933. She, Ingeborg and her governess Katharina Freytag left Germany for England where Bieber became an honorary fellow at Somerville College, Oxford.

=== Emigration to America ===
Bieber left for the United States in 1934 at the invitation of Barnard College, where she was a lecturer. She was recommended to Columbia University, where she became a visiting professor in the Department of Art History and Archaeology in 1936. She applied for American citizenship in 1939.

In 1939, she published The History of the Greek and Roman Theater. It became a foundational text for students of the ancient theaters of Greece and Rome, delving into the nuances of production and the practicalities of staging.

During World War II, Bieber assisted German refugees. She retired from Columbia University in 1948, though she continued to lecture at the Columbia University School of General Studies and at Princeton University. The Bollingen Foundation helped to fund The Sculpture of the Hellenistic Age, published in 1955. She continued to publish works, describing sculpture in American museums and ancient clothing.

Bieber was elected a Fellow of the American Academy of Arts and Sciences in 1971 and in 1974, the Archaeological Institute of America awarded her the Gold Medal for Distinguished Archaeological Achievement. She remained active in her later years, living with her adopted daughter, Ingeborg Sachs. Her final work, Ancient Copies, was published in 1977 and detailed the transformation and reflection in Roman copies of Greek art. Bieber died on 25 February 1978 in New Canaan, Connecticut. She was 98.

== Selected bibliography ==
A bibliography of Bieber's writings when she was 90 included some 327 items.

- Das Dresdener Schauspielrelief. Ein Beitrag zur Geschichte des tragischen Kostüms und der griechischen Kunst. Dissertation, 1907
- Die Denkmäler zum Theaterwesen im Altertum. Habil.-Schrift, University of Giessen 1919
- Griechische Kleidung. 1928.
- Entwicklungsgeschichte der griechischen Tracht von der vorgriechischen Zeit bis zur römischen Kaiserzeit. Berlin: Gebr. Mann. 1934.
- The History of the Greek and Roman Theater. Princeton University Press. 1939.
- The Sculpture of the Hellenistic Age. Columbia University Press. 1955. (1980 reprint: ISBN 978-0-87817-257-3)
- Autobiography of a Female Scholar. (Unpublished). 1959.
- Alexander the Great in Greek and Roman Art. Chicago: Argonaut. 1964. ISBN 978-0-916710-69-9.
- Ancient copies: Contributions to the history of Greek and Roman art. New York: New York U.P. 1977. ISBN 978-0-8147-0970-2.

== See also ==
- Women in the art history field
