= Gdańsk Pomerania =

Gdańsk Pomerania: Pomorze Gdańskie (Polish); Gduńsczé Pòmòrzé (Kashubian)
- Historical region
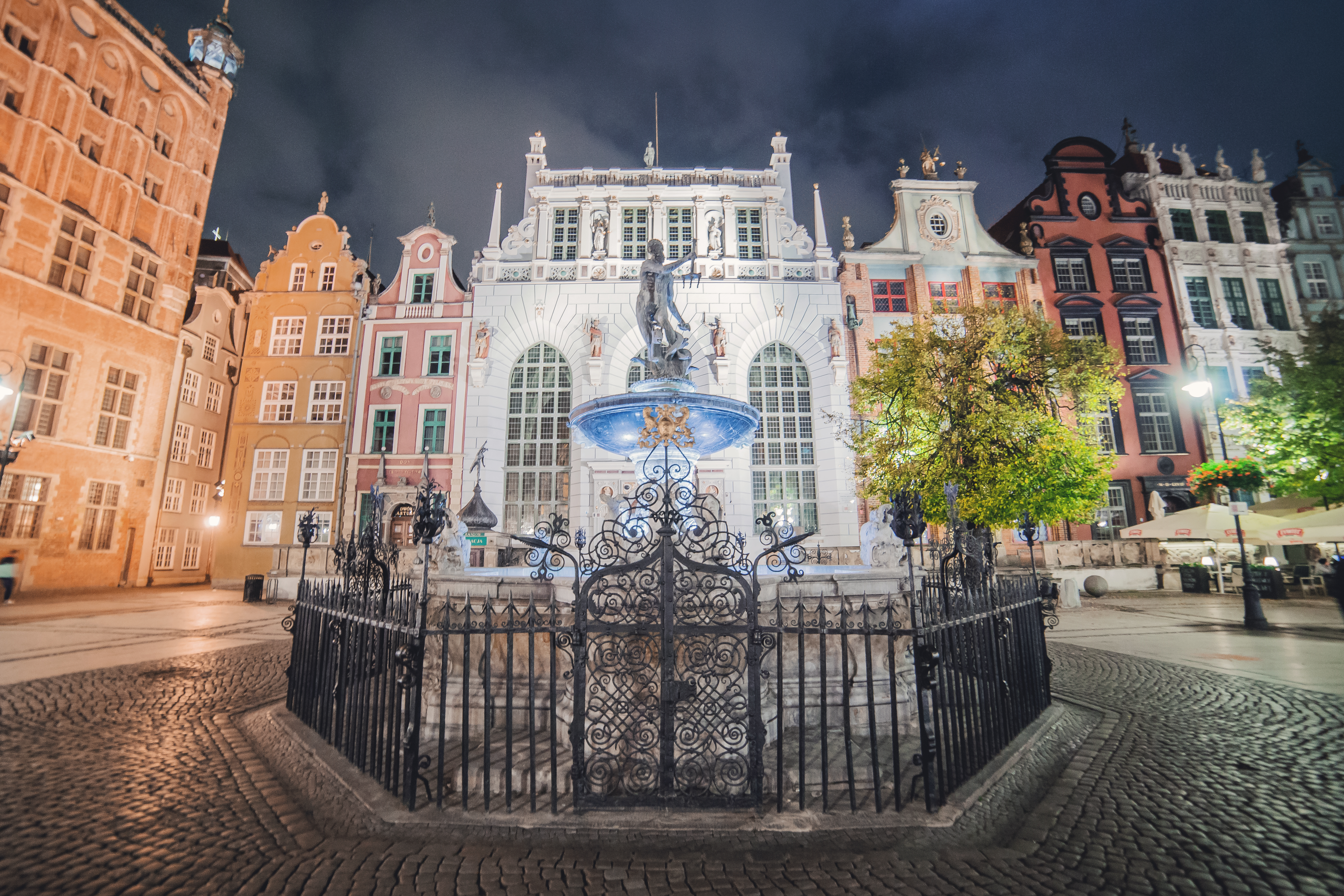
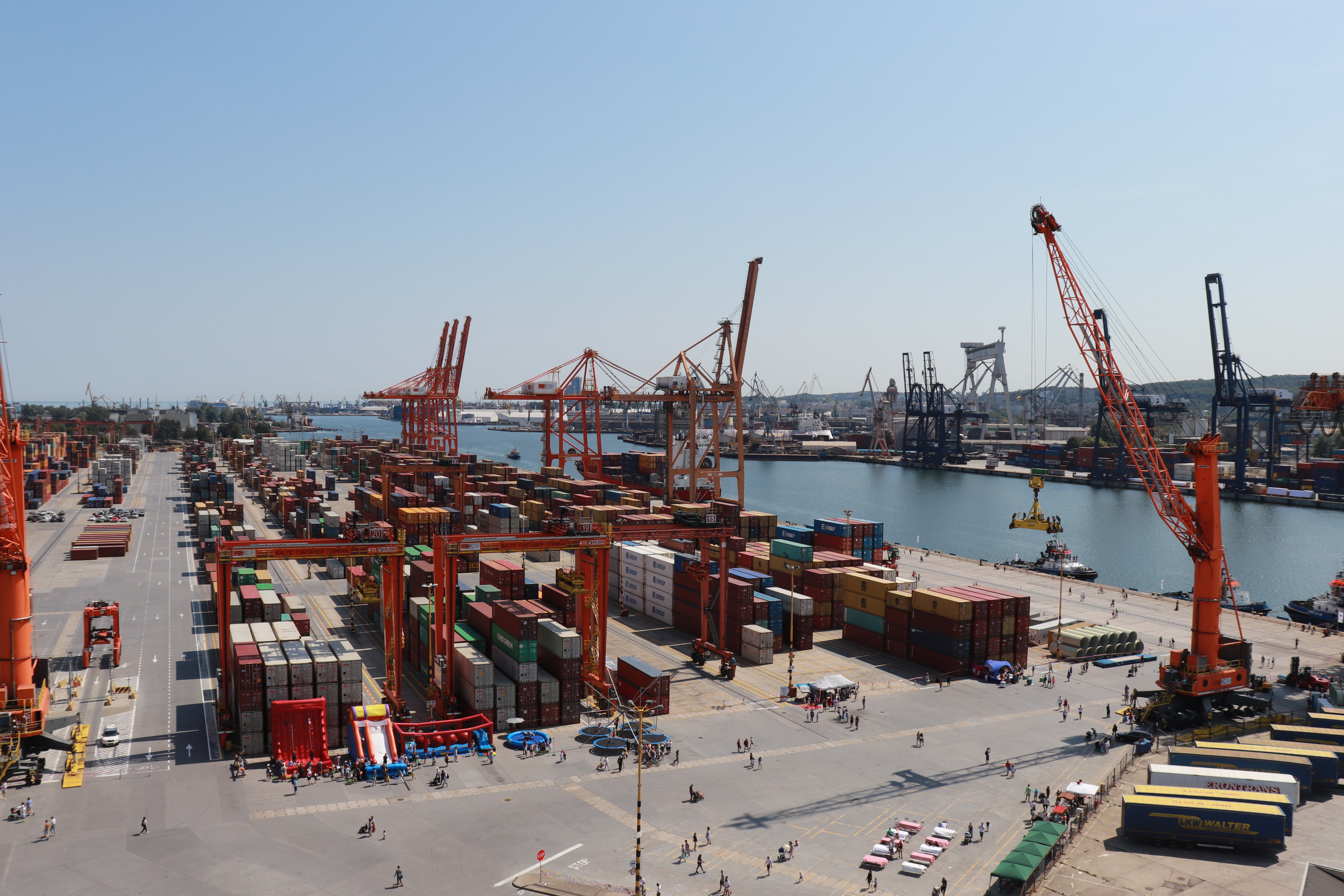
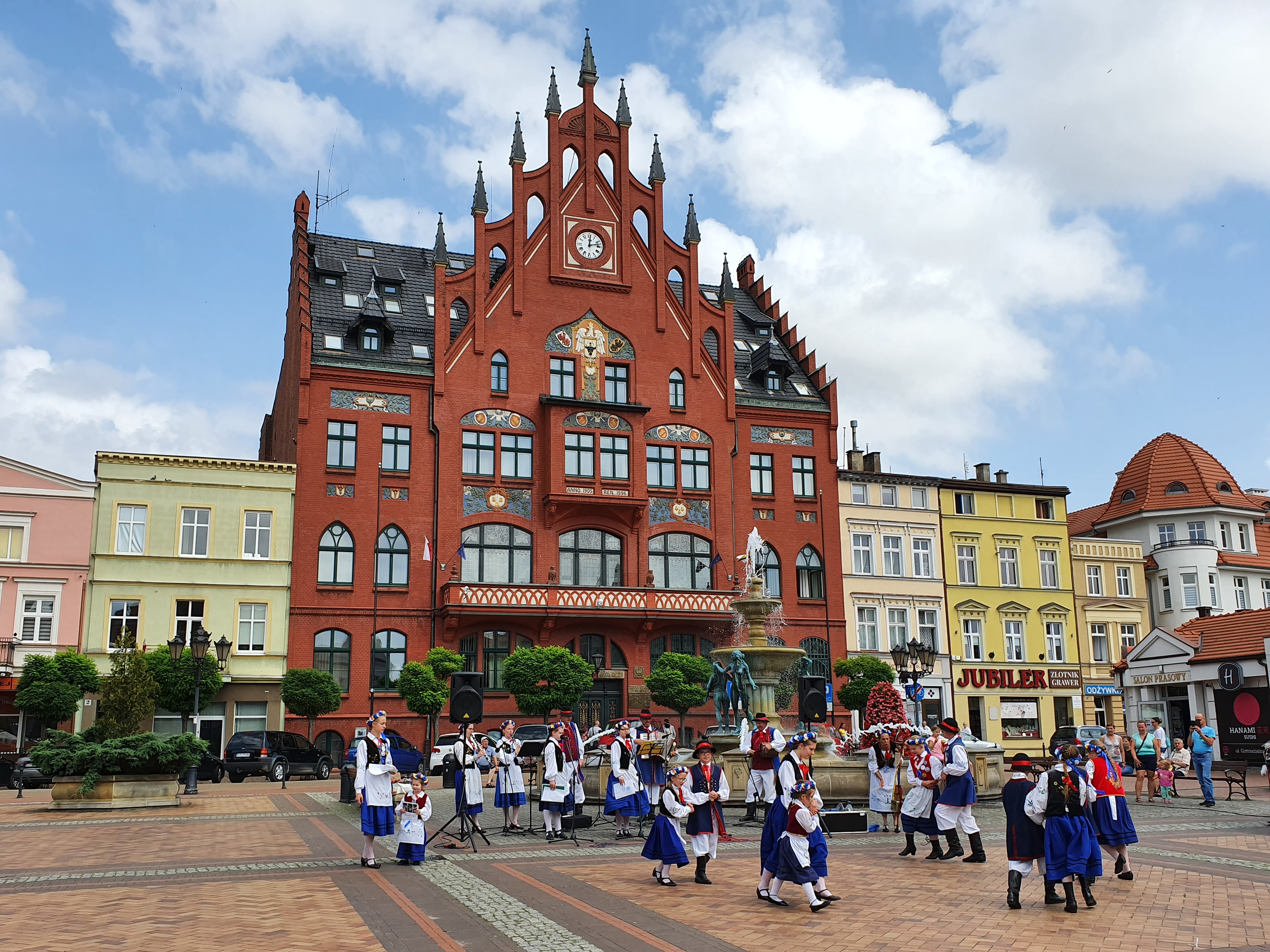
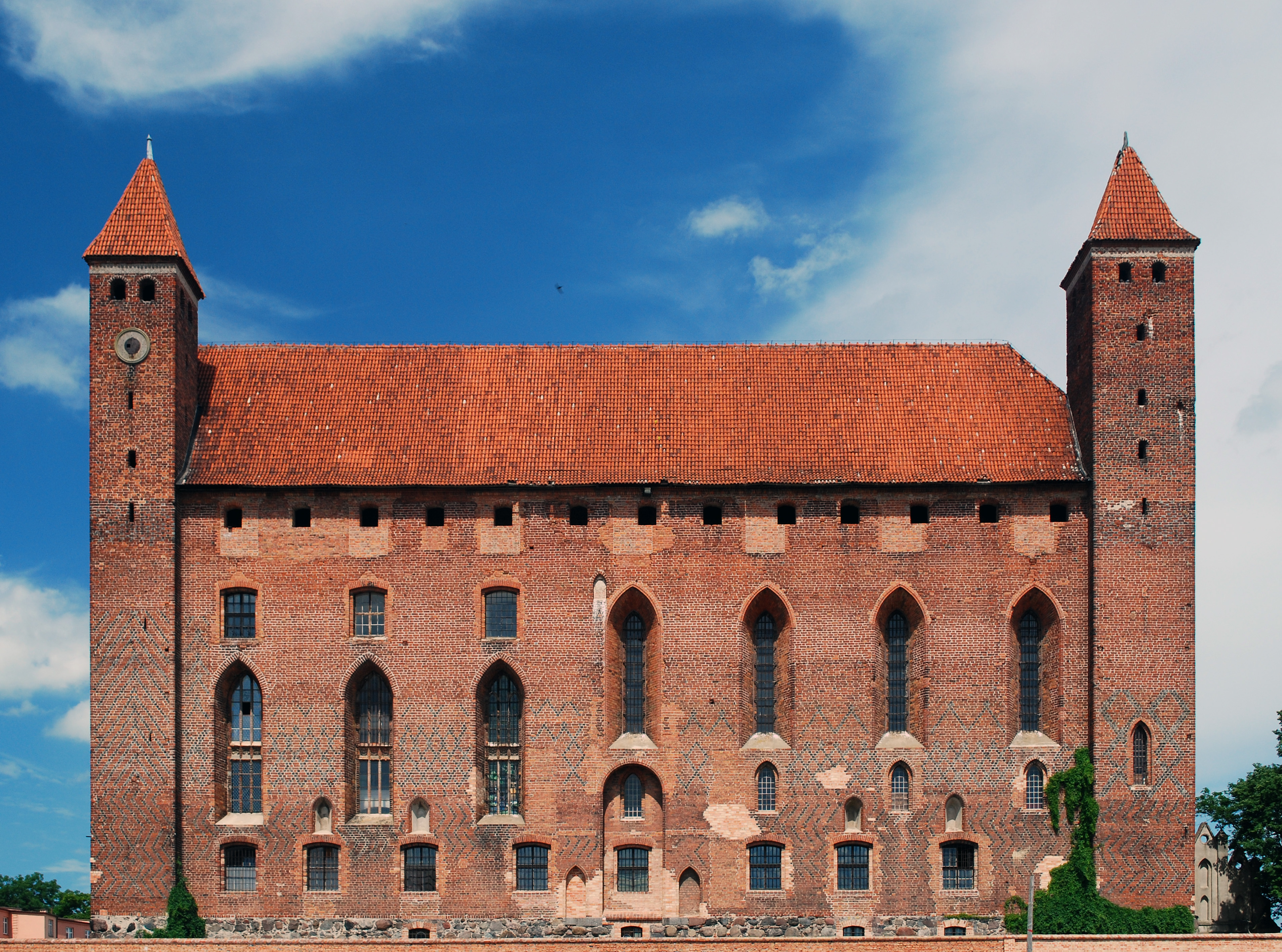
- Neptune's Fountain, Gdańsk Port of Gdynia Town Hall, Chojnice Gniew Castle

- Coat of arms

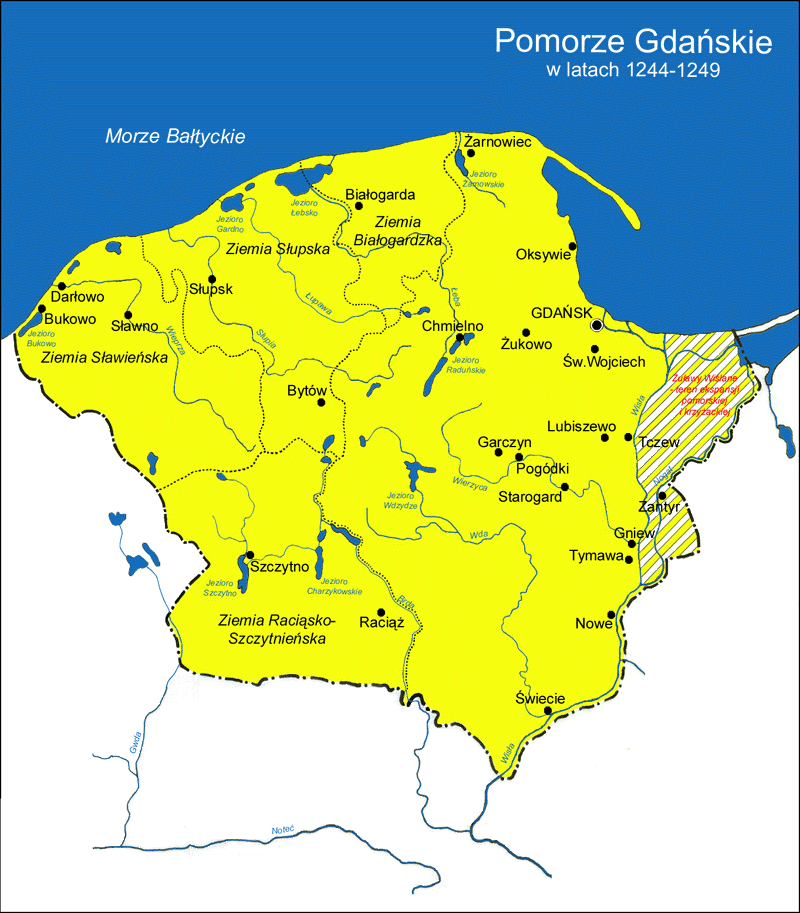
- Gdańsk Pomerania in 1244–1249
- Country: Poland; Russia¹
- Historical region: Pomerania
- Largest city: Gdańsk
- Time zone: UTC+1 (CET)
  - Summer (DST): UTC+2 (CEST)
- ¹ Russian portion of the Vistula Spit

Gdańsk Pomerania (Polish: Pomorze Gdańskie; Kashubian: Gduńsczé Pòmòrzé; German: Danziger Pommern) is the main geographical region within Pomerelia (also known as Vistula Pomerania, Eastern Pomerania, and previously Polish Pomerania) in northern Poland, covering the bulk of Pomeranian Voivodeship. In contrast to Pomerelia and its synonyms, the term does not cover the historical areas of Chełmno Land and Michałów Land, sometimes with the addition of Lubawa Land.

The area has traditionally been divided into the Kashubia, Kociewie and Tuchola Forest regions. The Lębork and Bytów Land is considered by the Polish historiography a part of Kashubia (and thus Gdańsk Pomerania), while German historiography tends to treat it as a part of Farther Pomerania. Gdańsk Pomerania has been inhabited by ethnic Kashubians, Kociewians and Borowians, respectively. A small portion of Gdańsk Pomerania in the eastern part of the Vistula Spit around the abandoned village of Polski is now part of the Kaliningrad Oblast of Russia.

== Name ==
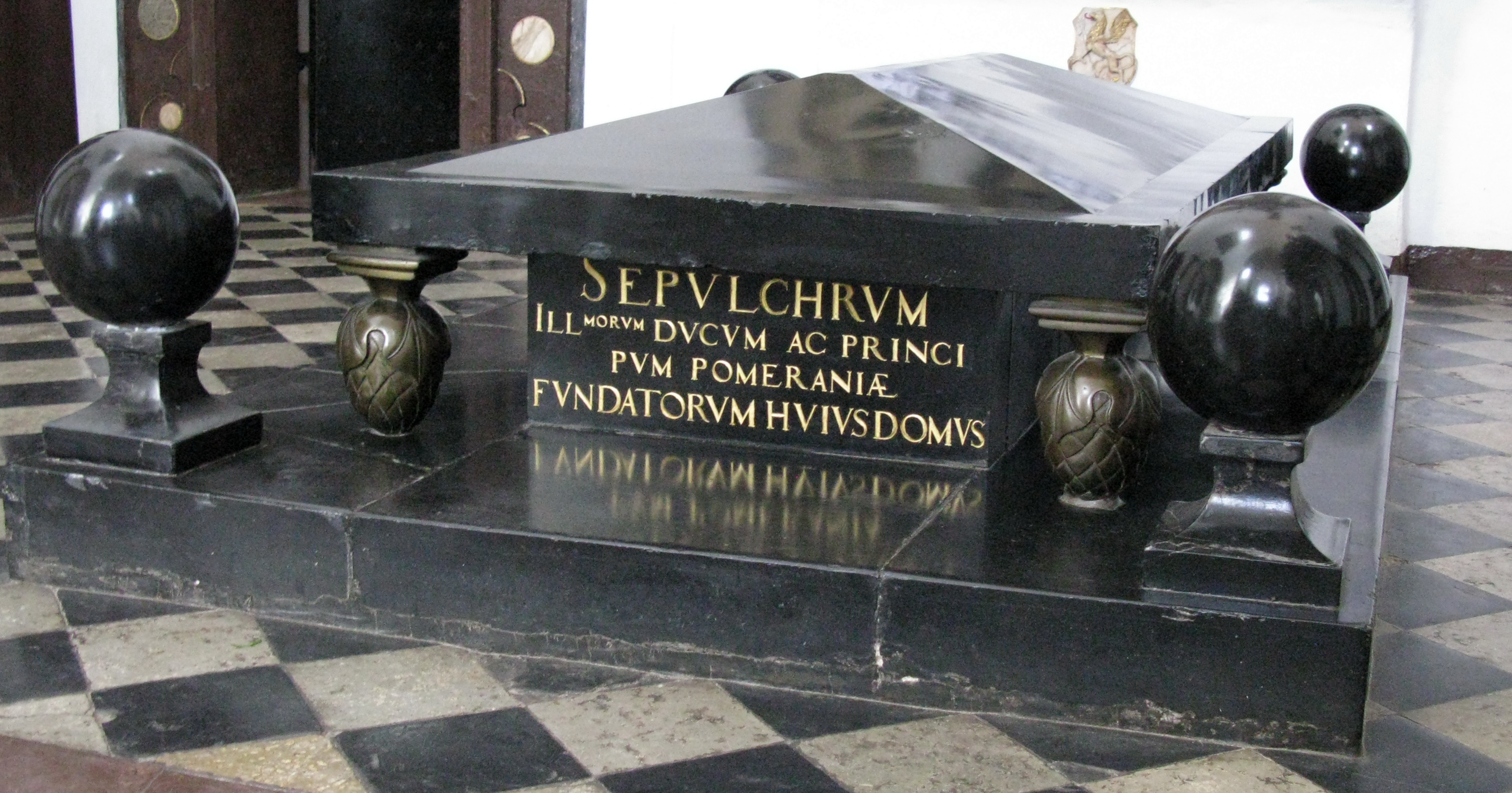
Tomb of the medieval dukes of Gdańsk Pomerania of the House of Sobiesław with the Latin name Pomerania at the Oliwa Cathedral in Gdańsk

In Polish language, the area was called Pomorze ('Pomerania') since the Middle Ages. In the early 14th century the Teutonic Knights invaded and annexed the region from Poland into their monastic state, which already included historical Prussia, located east of the region. As a result of the Teutonic rule, in German terminology the name of Prussia was also extended to annexed Polish lands like Vistula/Eastern Pomerania, although it was never inhabited by Baltic Prussians but by the Slavic Poles.

After the area was reintegrated with Poland in 1466 both names were in use: Pomerania was used when referring to the Pomeranian Voivodeship (Gdansk Pomerania) and Chełmno Voivodeship, while Royal Prussia was used as the name of the wider province, which, however, also included the Malbork Voivodeship and the Prince-Bishopric of Warmia, covering the Prussian historical areas of Pomesania, Pogesania and Warmia. After the Partitions of Poland, the area was annexed by the Kingdom of Prussia and formed part of the newly established province of West Prussia, and the name Pomerania was not used by Prussian or German authorities in relation to this region.

Following World War I and Poland's independence, much of this area became part of the new Second Polish Republic and was organized into the Pomeranian Voivodeship. After World War II, Poland gained the remainder of the area including the city of Gdańsk, except the village of Polski, which was annexed by the Soviet Union.

== Population ==
The indigenous population of the area are the Slavic Kashubians, who speak the Kashubian dialect of the Pomeranian language, as well as the Kociewiacy and the Borowiacy speaking the Greater Polish dialects of Polish. The Kashubians are organized in the Kashubian-Pomeranian Association.

== Cities and towns ==
- Biały Bór
- Brusy
- Bytów
- Chojnice
- Czarna Woda
- Czarne
- Czersk
- Człuchów
- Debrzno
- Gdańsk
- Gdynia
- Gniew
- Hel
- Jastarnia
- Kartuzy
- Kościerzyna
- Krynica Morska
- Lębork
- Łeba
- Nowe
- Pelplin
- Pruszcz Gdański
- Puck
- Reda
- Rumia
- Skarszewy
- Skórcz
- Sopot
- Starogard Gdański
- Świecie
- Tczew
- Tuchola
- Wejherowo
- Władysławowo
- Żukowo

== Curiosities ==
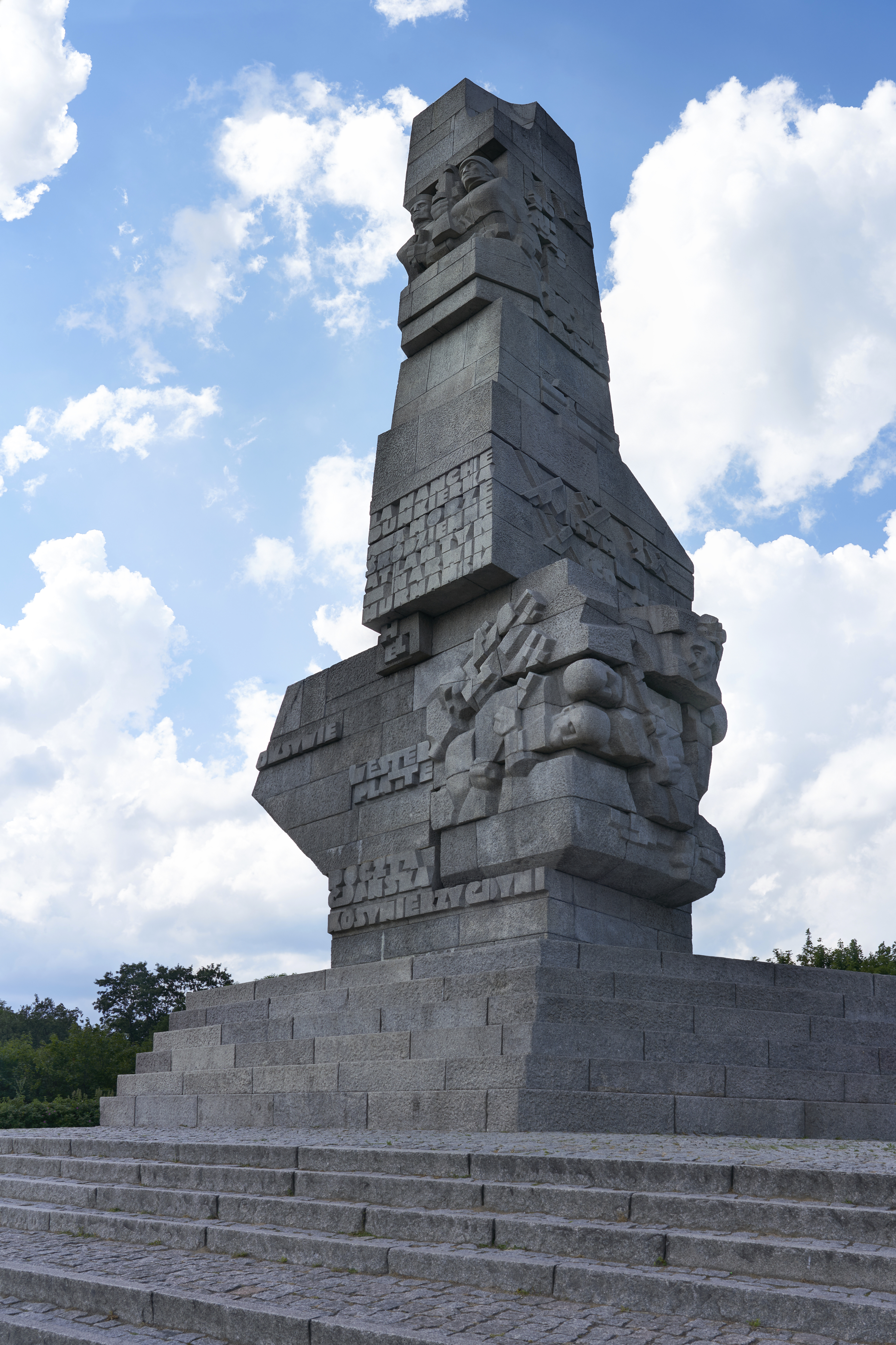
Westerplatte Monument in Gdańsk

- The city of Gdańsk was the largest city of Poland for over 250 years, from the mid-15th century to the early 18th century, when it was surpassed by the national capital of Warsaw. Gdańsk has five sites listed as Historic Monuments of Poland, a joint record with Kraków, including its historic city center.
- Gdańsk Pomerania is home to the St. Mary's Church, Gdańsk, the largest Gothic church in Poland, and of the largest brick churches in the world.
- The longest wooden pier in Europe, the Sopot Pier, is located in the voivodeship.
- The Tuchola Forest National Park is located in the region.
- In 1380, the first Scots settled in Gdańsk, founding what would eventually become a significant Scottish diaspora in Poland, and later on, Scots also lived in Chojnice, Czarne, Człuchów, Debrzno, Gniew, Kościerzyna, Puck, Starogard Gdański, Tczew. The Stare Szkoty neighbourhood of Gdańsk is named after the Scottish settlers.
- One of the three parish churches of the Armenian Catholic Church in Poland is located in Gdańsk (see also: Armenians in Poland).
- The Westerplatte peninsula in Gdańsk was the site of the Battle of Westerplatte, the first battle of the German invasion of Poland and World War II, and is now designated a Historic Monument of Poland.
- Sztutowo is the location of the former Stutthof concentration camp, the first Nazi German concentration camp established outside of pre-war Germany during World War II.
- There are numerous memorials at the sites of Nazi massacres of Poles from World War II, including the largest massacres in Piaśnica, Szpęgawsk and Chojnice.

== See also ==
- History of Pomerania
- History of Gdańsk
- Eastern Pomerania (disambiguation)
- Dukes of Pomerania
- Pomeranian Voivodship
