= Tuchola Landscape Park =

Protected area in Poland

Coordinates: 53.6853°N 17.9411°E

- Tucholski Park Krajobrazowy
- IUCN category V (protected landscape/seascape)
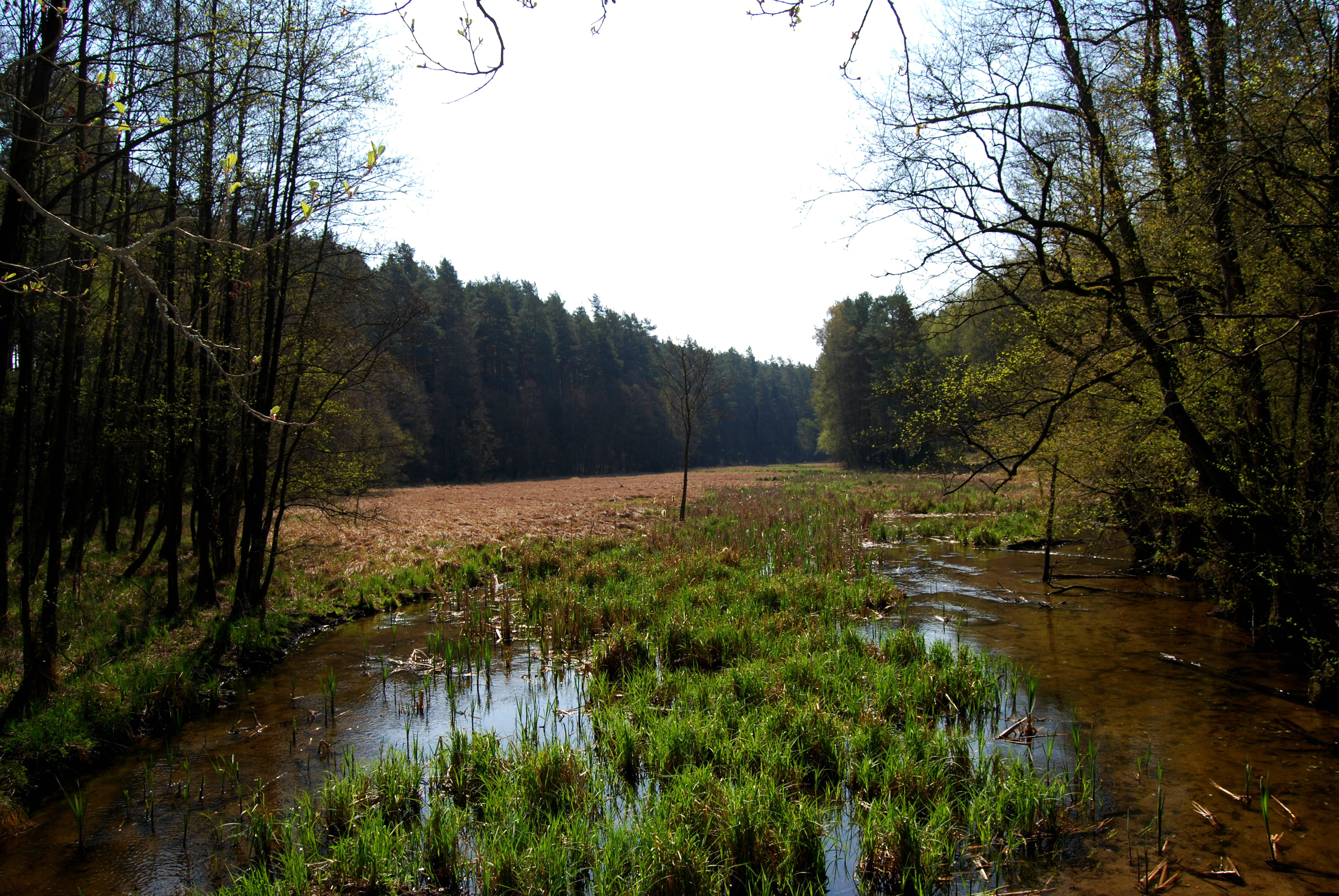
- Interactive map of Tuchola Landscape Park
- Location: north Poland
- Area: 369.83 km^{2} (142.79 sq mi)
- Established: 1985

Tuchola Landscape Park (Tucholski Park Krajobrazowy) is a protected area (Landscape Park) in north-central Poland, established in 1985, covering an area of 369.83 square kilometres (142.79 sq mi) in the Tuchola Forests close to the town of Tuchola.

The Park is shared between two voivodeships: Kuyavian-Pomeranian Voivodeship and Pomeranian Voivodeship. Within Kuyavian-Pomeranian Voivodeship it lies in Tuchola County (Gmina Tuchola, Gmina Cekcyn, Gmina Gostycyn, Gmina Lubiewo, Gmina Śliwice). Within Pomeranian Voivodeship it lies in Chojnice County (Gmina Chojnice, Gmina Czersk). Within the Landscape Park are eight nature reserves.

The Park (together with the Wda, Wdzydze and Zaborski Landscape Parks) forms the buffer zone of the Tuchola Forest Biosphere Reserve, designated under the UNESCO Man and the Biosphere Programme in 2010. The core area of the Biosphere Reserve consists of Tuchola Forest National Park and the nature reserves lying within the Landscape Parks of the buffer zone.
