= Wda Landscape Park =

Protected area in Poland

Coordinates: 53°36′53″N 18°18′07″E

- Wdecki Park Krajobrazowy
- IUCN category V (protected landscape/seascape)
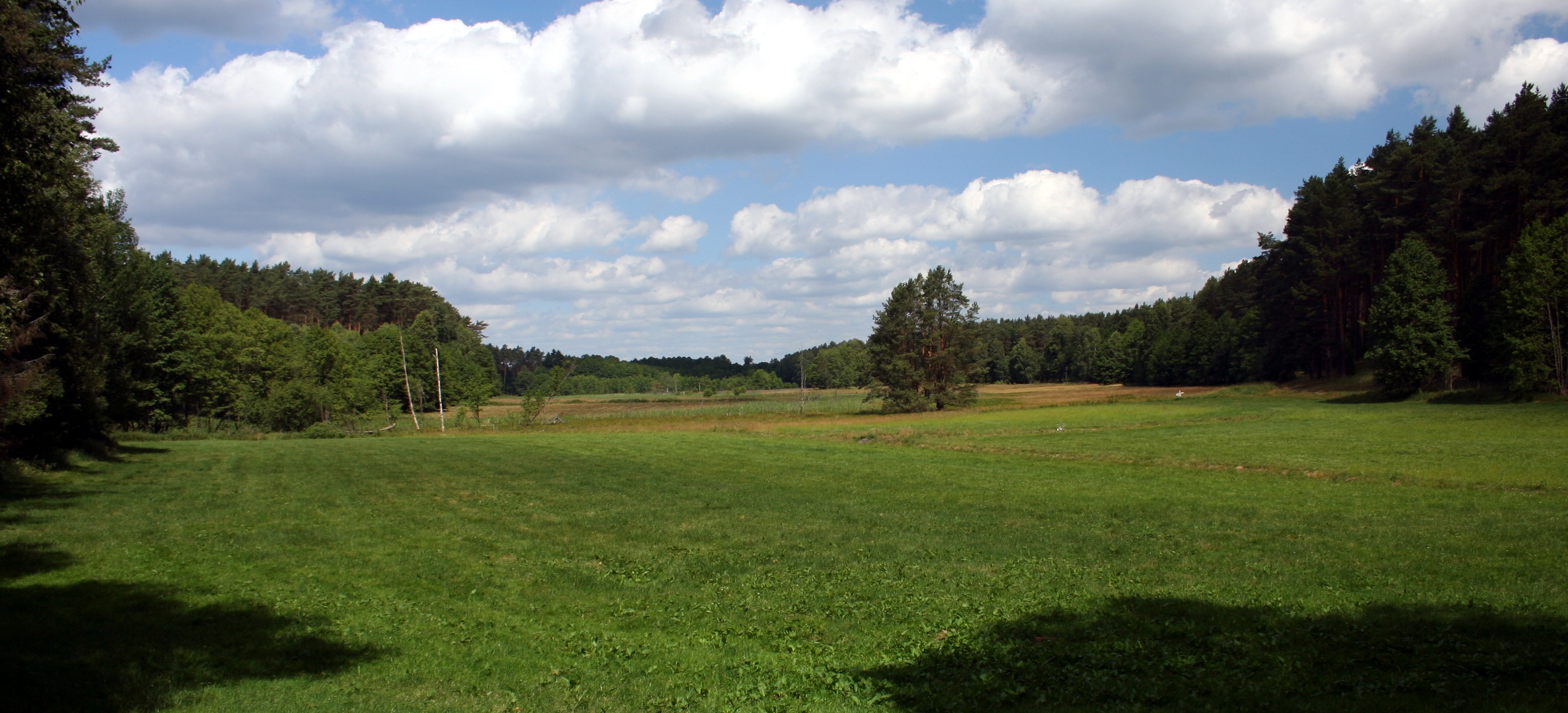
- Interactive map of Wda Landscape Park
- Location: Kuyavian-Pomeranian Voivodeship
- Area: 237.86 km^{2} (91.84 sq mi)
- Established: 1993

Wda Landscape Park (Wdecki Park Krajobrazowy) is a protected area (Landscape Park) in north-central Poland, established in 1993. Covering an area of 237.86 square kilometres (91.84 sq mi), the park takes its name from the Wda river.

The park lies within Kuyavian-Pomeranian Voivodeship: in Świecie County (Gmina Drzycim, Gmina Jeżewo, Gmina Lniano, Gmina Osie, Gmina Warlubie) and Tuchola County (Gmina Cekcyn, Gmina Śliwice). Within the Landscape Park are five nature reserves.

The park (together with the Tuchola, Wdzydze and Zaborski Landscape Parks) forms the buffer zone of the Tuchola Forest Biosphere Reserve, designated under the UNESCO Man and the Biosphere Programme in 2010. The core area of the Biosphere Reserve consists of Tuchola Forest National Park and the nature reserves lying within the Landscape Parks of the buffer zone.

== History ==
After the construction of the hydroelectric power plant in Żur in 1930, as a result of damming the Wda and flooding the estuary sections of its tributaries, the Żur Reservoir with an area of 440 ha was created. This resulted in a rise in the water level and a connection of the Wda river with two flooded depressions of the area, i.e. the present lakes Wierzchy and Mukrza. In this way, numerous picturesque islands were created in the Zalew Żurski. The most famous of them is Madeira.
