= Żur, Kociewie =

Village in Kociewie

Żur
- Village
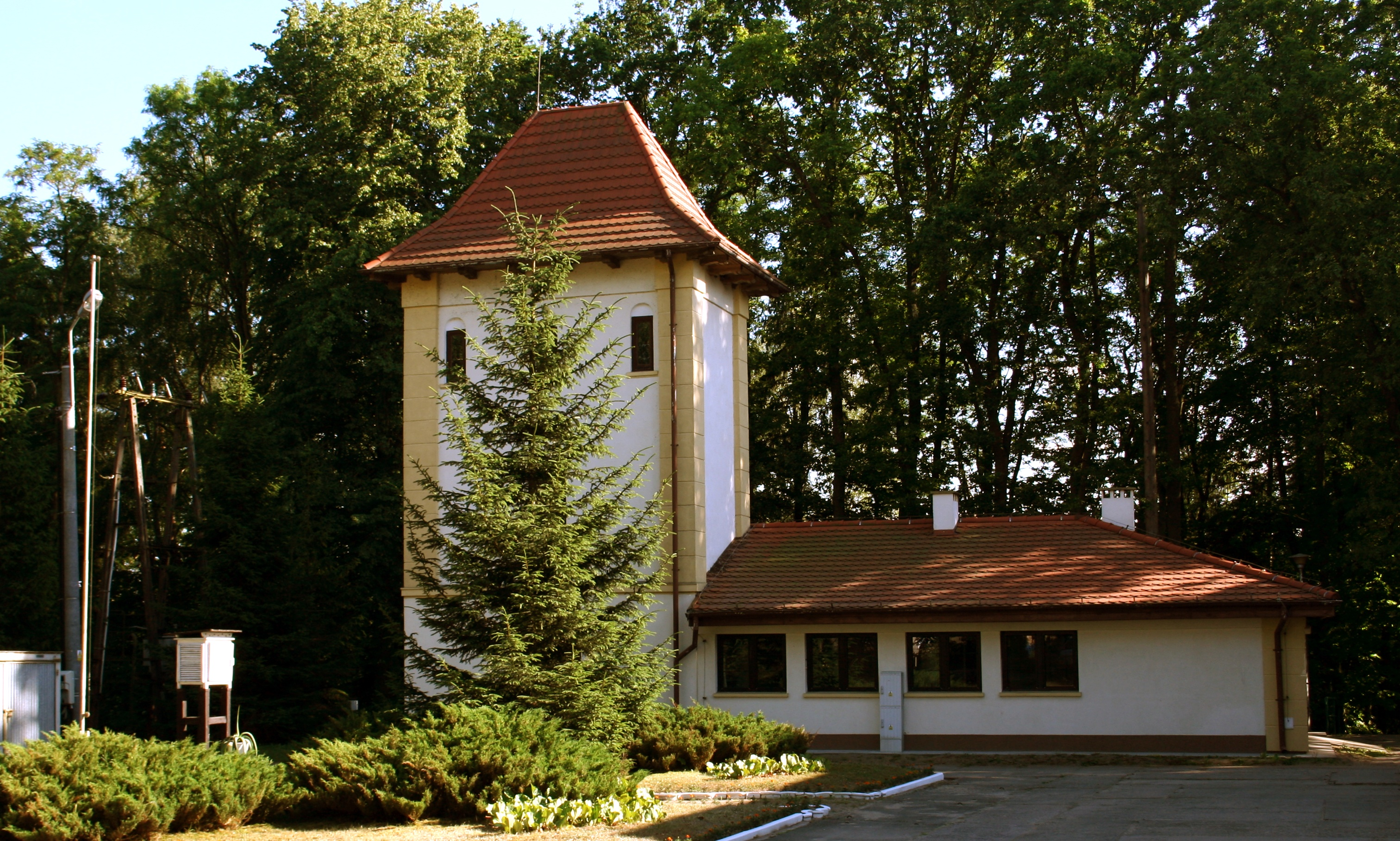
- Interactive map of Żur
- Country: Poland
- Voivodeship: Kuyavian–Pomeranian
- County: Świecie
- Gmina: Osie

Population
  - Total: 207
- Postal code: 86-150
- SIMC: 0093421

Żur is a village in the administrative district of Gmina Osie, within Świecie County, Kuyavian–Pomeranian Voivodeship, in northern Poland. The village lies within the Wda Landscape Park in the ethnocultural region of Kociewie.

== Infrastructure ==
Żur is located by the Wda river, which forms part of the West Pomeranian Lake Land. The area is largely rural and agricultural; however the landscape around Żur, and the surrounding villages of Gródek, Kozłowo and Przechowo, have been heavily adapted for human use through the construction of hydroelectric dams. Construction of the dam in Żur began in 1927 in response to the increased demand for electricity caused by the growth of the port of Gdynia. Construction of the dam drastically changed the ecology of the surrounding landscape. The resultant rise of the water table led to new wetland habitats forming around the village. Maintenance of the earth dam has been ongoing since its construction due to the issue of clogging. From the 1930s the area around Żur has been a popular tourist destinations for hikers and campers, due to the effects of the dam on the natural landscape.
