= Wdzydze Landscape Park =

Protected area in Poland

- Wdzydzki Park Krajobrazowy
- IUCN category V (protected landscape/seascape)
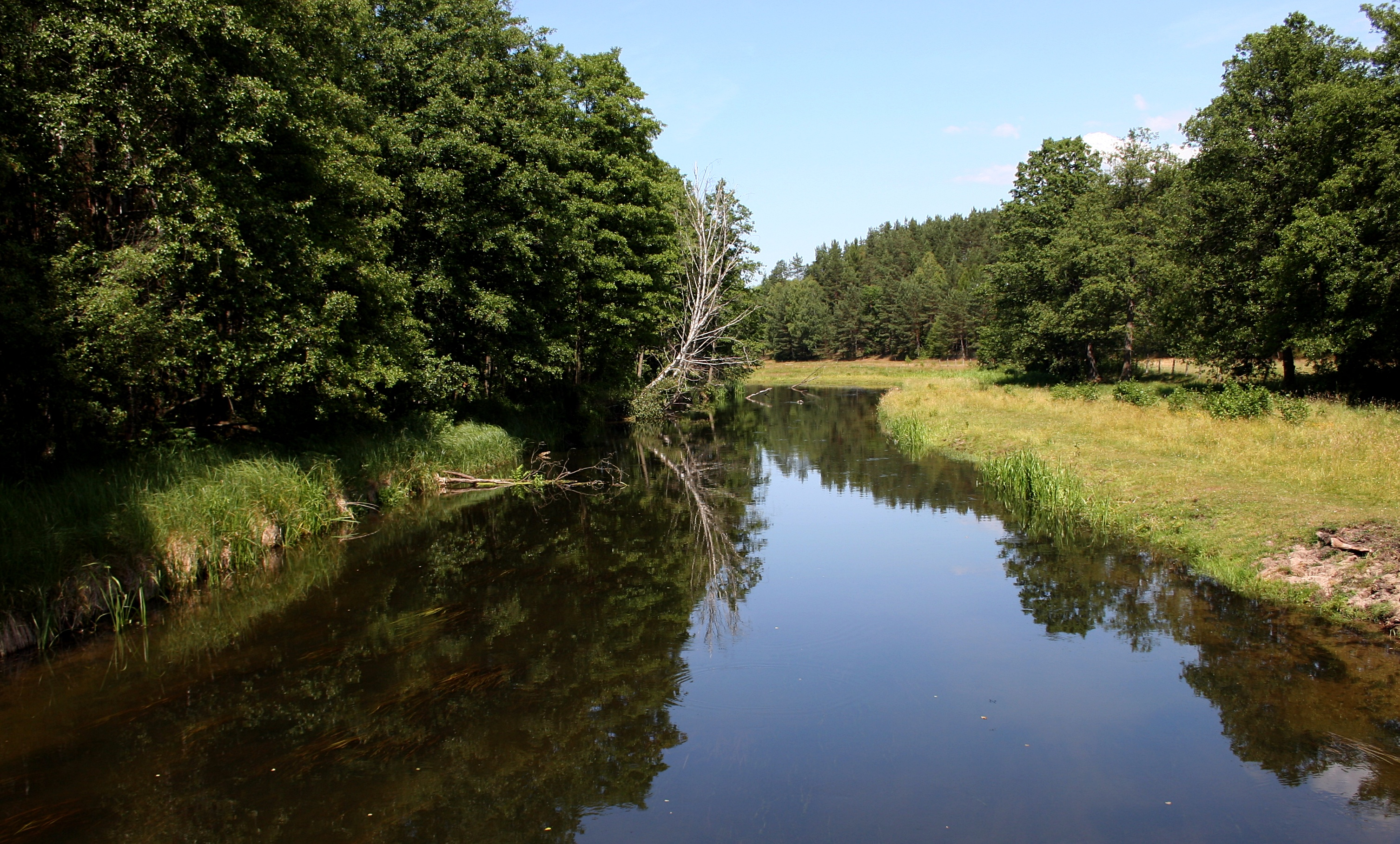
- Wda River in the park

- Location within Poland
- Location: Pomeranian Voivodeship, Poland
- Coordinates: 54.013°N 17.901°E
- Area: 178.32 km^{2} (68.85 sq mi)
- Established: 1983

Wdzydze Landscape Park (Wdzydzki Park Krajobrazowy) is a protected area (Landscape Park) in northern Poland, established in 1983. It covers an area of 178.32 square kilometres (68.85 sq mi).

The Park lies within Pomeranian Voivodeship, in Kościerzyna County (Gmina Dziemiany, Gmina Karsin, Gmina Kościerzyna, Gmina Lipusz, Gmina Stara Kiszewa).

The Park (together with the Tuchola, Wda and Zaborski Landscape Parks) forms the buffer zone of the Tuchola Forest Biosphere Reserve, designated under the UNESCO Man and the Biosphere Programme in 2010. The core area of the Biosphere Reserve consists of Tuchola Forest National Park and the nature reserves lying within the Landscape Parks of the buffer zone.
