= Gmina Świekatowo =

Gmina Świekatowo Świekatowo Commune
- Gmina
- Flag Coat of arms
- Interactive map of Gmina Świekatowo
- Coordinates (Świekatowo): 53°25′11″N 18°5′32″E
- Country: Poland
- Voivodeship: Kuyavian-Pomeranian
- County: Świecie
- Seat: Świekatowo

Area
  - Total: 64.74 km^{2} (25.00 sq mi)

Population (2006)
  - Total: 3,477
  - Density: 53.71/km^{2} (139.1/sq mi)

Gmina Świekatowo is a rural gmina (administrative district) in Świecie County, Kuyavian-Pomeranian Voivodeship, in north-central Poland. Its seat is the village of Świekatowo, which lies approximately 23 kilometres (14 mi) west of Świecie and 35 km (22 mi) north of Bydgoszcz.

The gmina covers an area of 64.74 square kilometres (25.0 sq mi), and as of 2006 its total population is 3,477.

== Villages ==
Gmina Świekatowo contains the villages and settlements of Jania Góra, Lipienica, Lubania-Lipiny, Małe Łąkie, Stążki, Świekatowo, Szewno, Tuszyny and Zalesie Królewskie.

== Neighbouring gminas ==
Gmina Świekatowo is bordered by the gminas of Bukowiec, Koronowo, Lniano, Lubiewo and Pruszcz.
