= Koschneiderisch =

East Pomeranian dialect

- Language family: Indo-European: Germanic; West Germanic; Ingvaeonic; Low German; East Low German; East Pomeranian; Koschneiderisch

Language codes
- ISO 639-3: –

Koschneiderisch is a part of East Low German East Pomeranian dialect of the Low German language. This almost moribund dialect used to be spoken in the triangle between Kashubia, Tuchola Forest and Krajna regions by catholic Germans resettled to the area from the Prince-Bishopric of Osnabrück by the Teutonic Order State during its brief control of the area at the end the 14th century, who maintained their original culture (including clothing).

In or shortly after World War II, the Koschneiderisch-speaking German inhabitants of the region largely fled or were expelled to western Germany. The dialect preserved many features of Westphalian dialect of Middle Low German (spoken by the original pioneer founding settlers), itself heavily influenced by the Middle Dutch. It has palatalization of the k-sound, resulting in a sound similar to the ć-sound of the Polish language. Koschneiderisch includes a limited number of High German words. It was among the varieties of the same part of East Pomeranian, that inter alia were spoken in Pomerelia, up to North of Czersk, South of Starogard Gdański and Kałębie Lake.
