= Jania Góra =

- Village
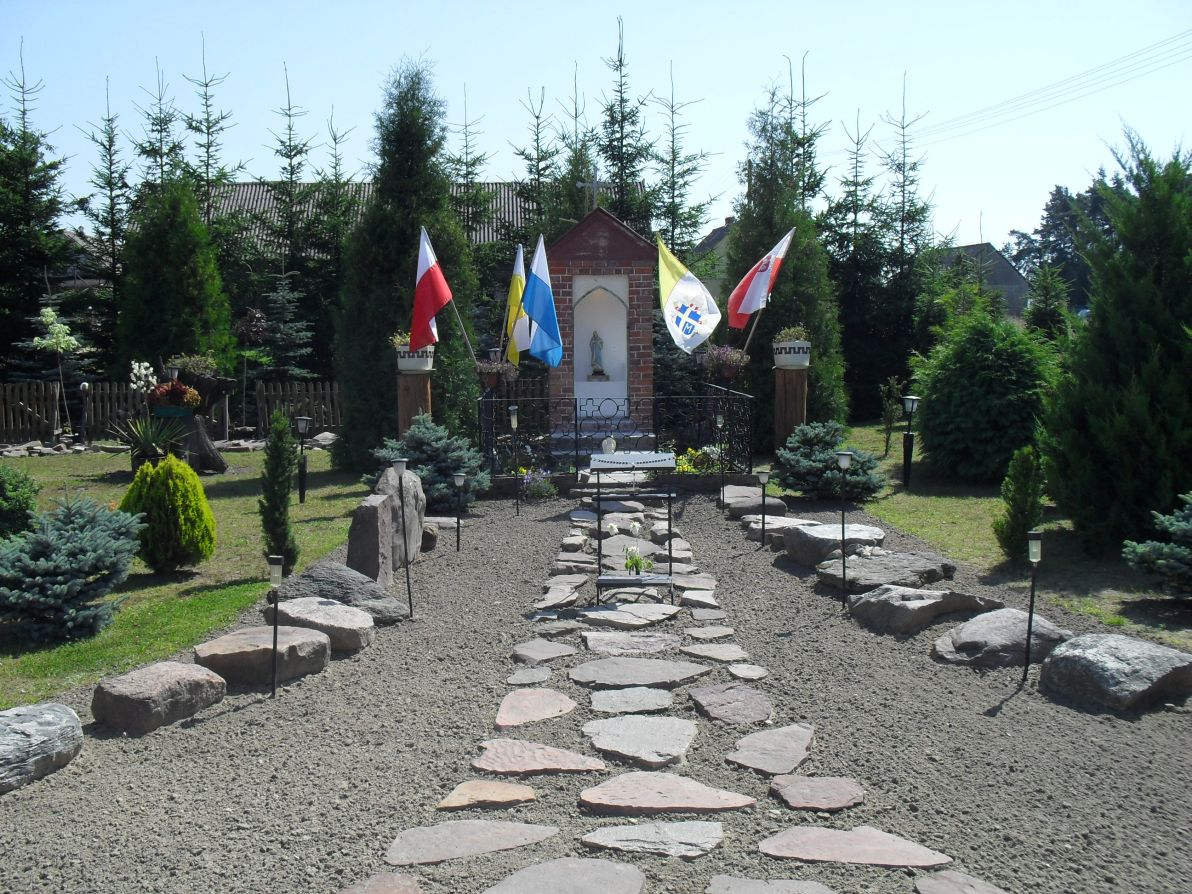
- Wayside shrine

- Location within Poland
- Coordinates: 53°24′N 18°4′E
- Country: Poland
- Voivodeship: Kuyavian-Pomeranian
- County: Świecie
- Gmina: Świekatowo

Jania Góra [ˈjaɲa ˈɡura] is a village in the administrative district of Gmina Świekatowo, within Świecie County, Kuyavian-Pomeranian Voivodeship, in north-central Poland.
