= Stążki, Kuyavian-Pomeranian Voivodeship =

Stążki
- Village
- Location within Poland
- Coordinates: 53°23′N 18°9′E
- Country: Poland
- Voivodeship: Kuyavian-Pomeranian
- County: Świecie
- Gmina: Świekatowo

Stążki [ˈstɔ̃ʂki] is a village in the administrative district of Gmina Świekatowo, within Świecie County, Kuyavian-Pomeranian Voivodeship, in north-central Poland.
