= Zaborski Landscape Park =

Protected area in northern Poland

Coordinates: 53°54′20″N 17°28′34″E

- Zaborski Park Krajobrazowy
- IUCN category V (protected landscape/seascape)
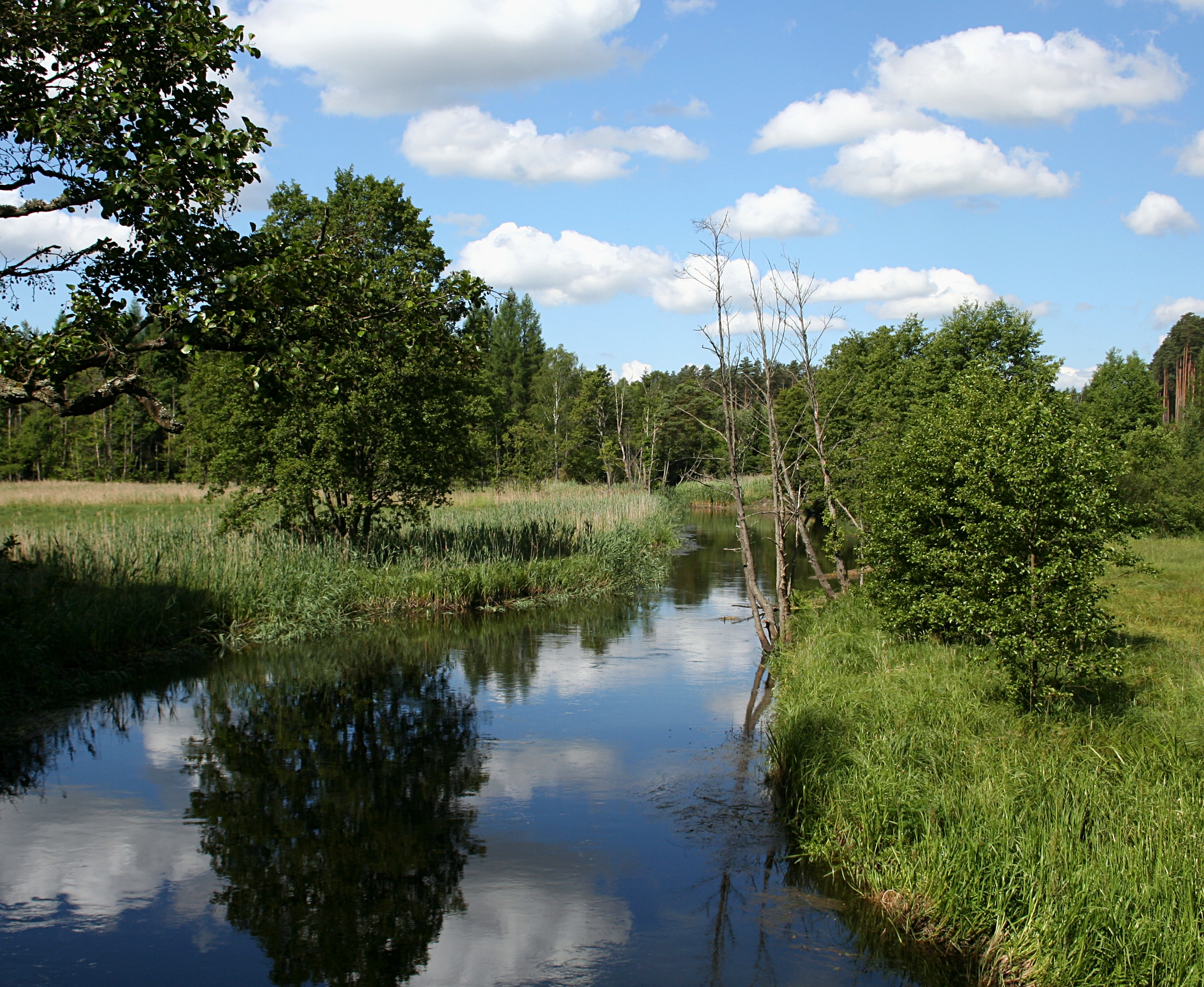
- Brda in the western part of the park
- Interactive map of Zaborski Landscape Park
- Location: Pomeranian Voivodeship
- Area: 340.26 km^{2} (131.38 sq mi)
- Established: 1990

Zaborski Landscape Park (Zaborski Park Krajobrazowy) is a protected area (Landscape Park) in northern Poland, established in 1990, covering an area of 340.26 square kilometres (131.38 sq mi) north of the town of Chojnice. It surrounds Tuchola Forest National Park.

The park lies within Pomeranian Voivodeship, in Chojnice County (Gmina Brusy, Gmina Chojnice). Within the Landscape Park are five nature reserves.

The park (together with the Tuchola, Wda and Wdzydze Landscape Parks) forms the buffer zone of the Tuchola Forest Biosphere Reserve, designated under the UNESCO Man and the Biosphere Programme in 2010. The core area of the Biosphere Reserve consists of Tuchola Forest National Park and the nature reserves, lying within the Landscape Parks of the buffer zone.
