= Tuchola Forest =

Forest complex located in northern Poland

Tuchola Forest Polish: Bory Tucholskie
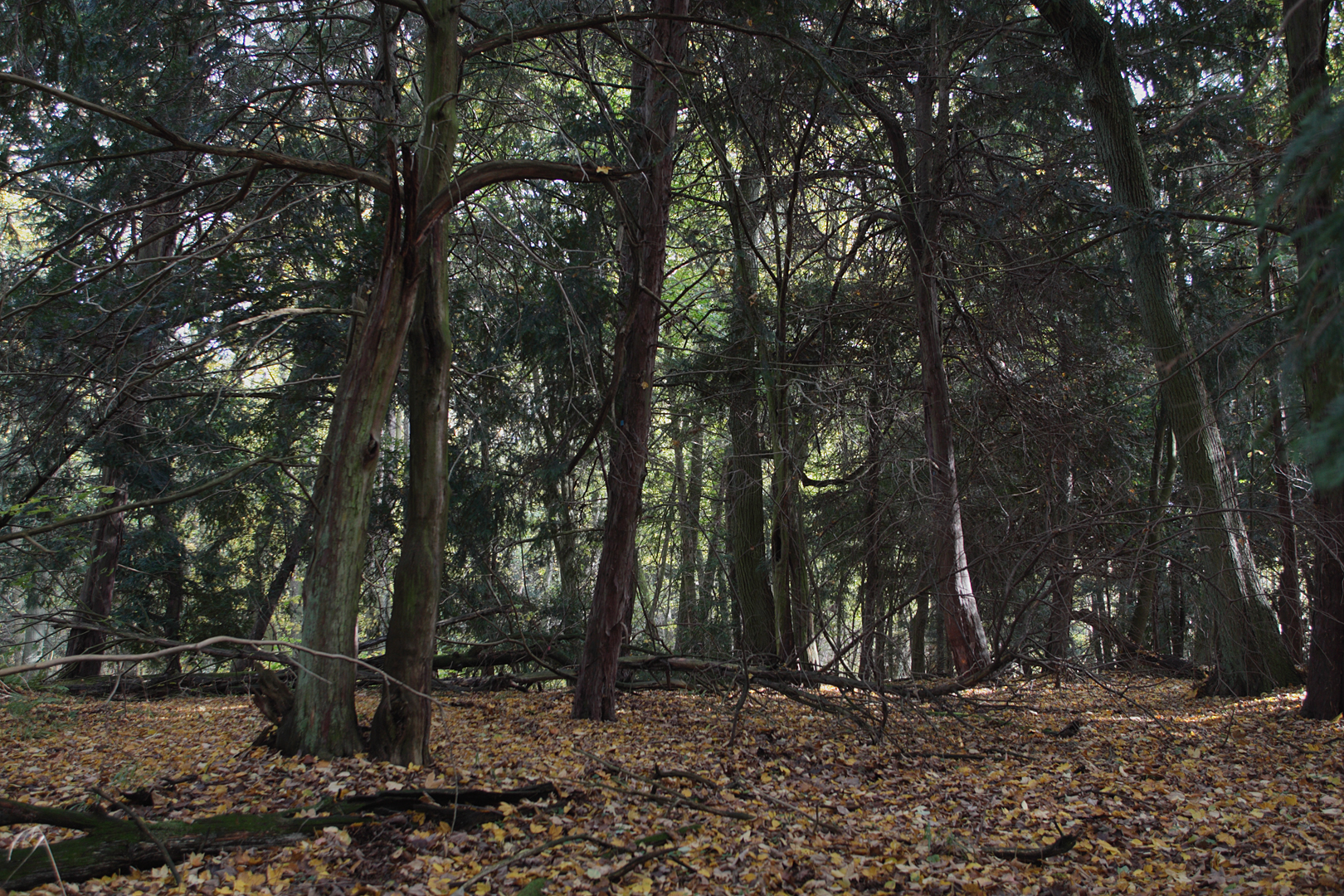
- Cisy Staropolskie, the oldest nature reserve in Poland, located in the southern part of Tuchola Forest

- Location within Poland

Geography
- Location: Poland
- Coordinates: 53°36′N 18°00′E

Administration
- Events: Battle of Tuchola Forest; Rudzki Most massacre

Ecology
- Dominant tree species: pine

The Tuchola Forest, also known as Tuchola Pinewoods or Tuchola Conifer Woods, (the latter a literal translation of Polish: Bory Tucholskie; Kashubian: Tëchòlsczé Bòrë; German: Tuchler or Tucheler Heide) is a large forest complex near the town of Tuchola in northern Poland. It lies between the Brda and Wda rivers, within the Gdańsk Pomerania region. The largest towns in the area are Czersk and Tuchola.

The designation may also refer to the eponymous historical land and ethnocultural region, World War II battle, geomorphological mesoregion, phytogeographic landscape region and syntaxonomical subregion, nature and forest mesoregion, promotional forest complex, Biosphere Reserve, Natura 2000 Special Protection Area, national park, LEADER/CLLD local action group, or a number of local associations. Geographical extent varies greatly among these units or entities.

== Geography, nature and ecology ==
With 3,200 km^{2} of dense spruce and pine forest, the area is one of the biggest forests in Poland and Central Europe.

=== Geomorphology and geology ===
The area was formed during the last glacial age and is covered with low hills and more than 900 post-glacial lakes. From the geomorphological point of view, the area is located in the South-Pomeranian Lakeland macroregion of the South-Baltic Lakelands Sub-Province belonging to the Polish Plain, a part of the North European Plain province. The forest covers the eponymous Tuchola Forest mesoregion, but also the Świecie Plain (both mesoregions sometimes jointly referred to as Tuchola Plain), large swaths of the Charzykowy Plain and the Brda River Valley mesoregions, as well as lesser parts of other mesoregions: the Bytów Lakeland, the Kashubia Lakeland, the Starogard Lakeland, and the Krajna Lakeland.

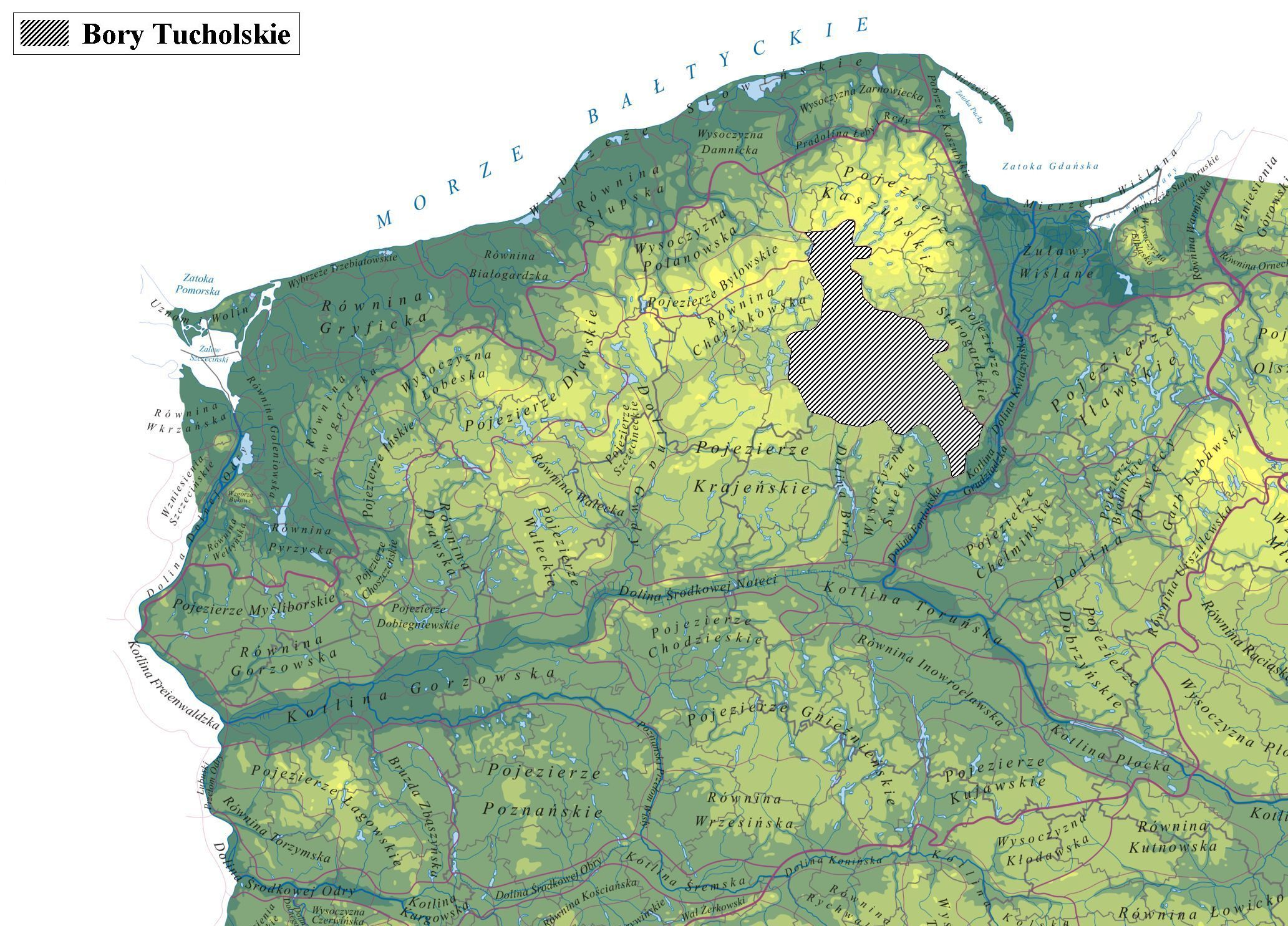
Location of the Tuchola Forest geomorphological mesoregion within northern Poland

The geology of Tuchola Forest consists mainly of sandar glaciofluvial deposits of sand sediment, while the soil is predominantly of podzol type.

=== Climate ===
The climate in the area is classified as Dfb climate, a variant of the hemiboreal subtype belonging to the humid continental climate type.

=== Phytogeography ===
From the geobotanical point of view, the area encompasses several floristic landscape subregions forming the eponymous Tuchola Forest landscape region, classified as the only landscape region in the eponymous Tuchola Forest syntaxonomical subregion of the Sandar Forefields of Central Pomeranian Lake District syntaxonomical region located in the Pomeranian divide of the South-Baltic subprovince.

A smaller part of the forest is located in three out of five floristic landscape subregions forming the Świecie Plain landscape region, classified in the Chełmno-Dobrzyń syntaxonomical region belonging to the Mazovian subdivide of the Mazovian-Polesian divide in the Central European (Proper) subprovince.

Both floristic subprovinces are parts of the Central European floristic province in the Circumboreal Region of the Holarctic Kingdom.

=== Ecology and habitat ===
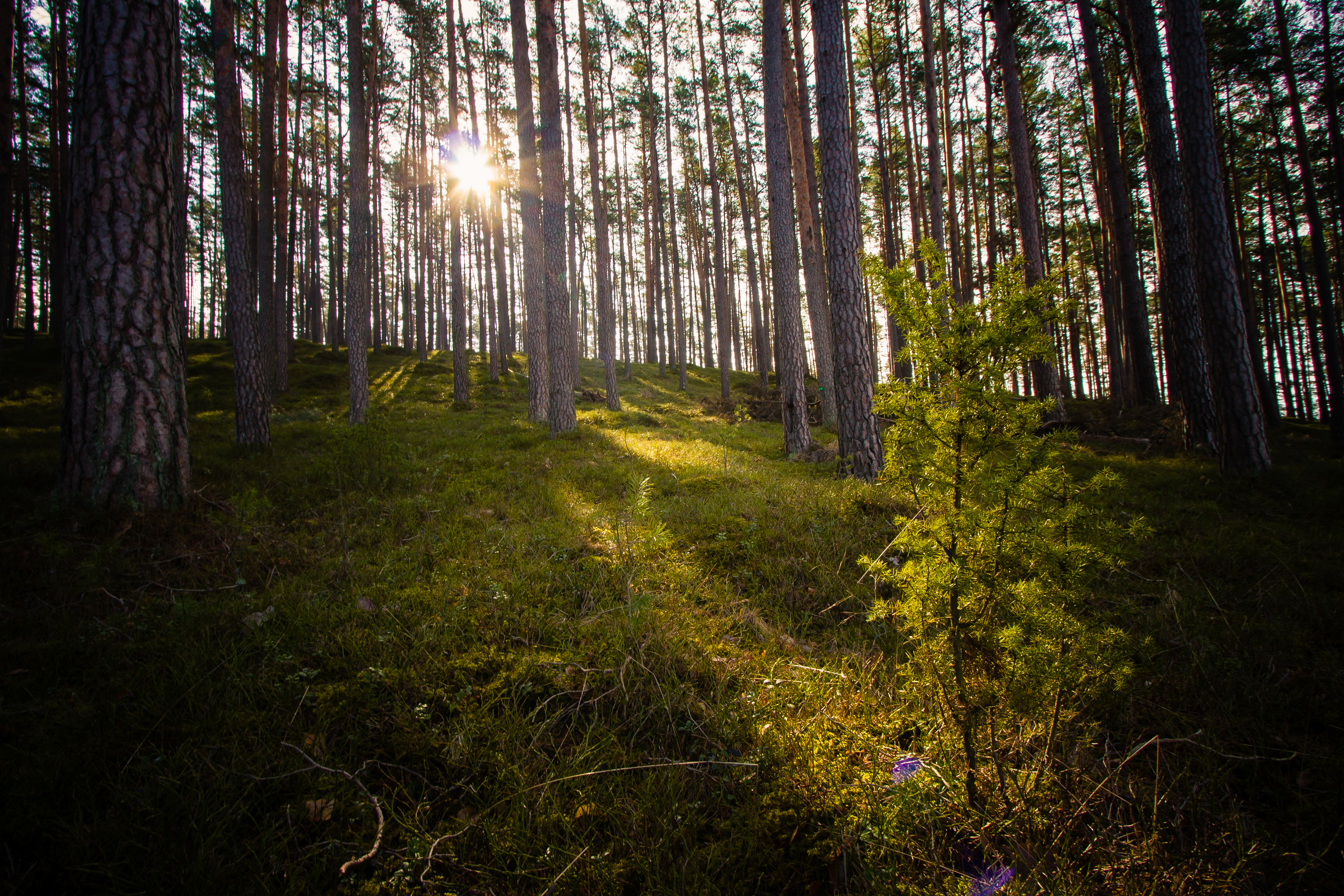
Tuchola Forest

This predominantly coniferous forest is composed mainly of suboceanic (Leucobryo-Pinetum) and subcontinental (Peucedano-Pinetum) young Scots pine forest habitat types covering 64.5% of the area of land habitats, as well as of dry acidophilous Scots pine forest (Cladonio-Pinetum) covering 2.5% of the area, and of marshy pine forest (Vaccinio-uliginosi-Pinetum). The Habitats Directive classifies the initial three habitat types jointly as the Central European lichen Scots pine forest habitat type, and the last one as belonging to bog woodlands habitat type, all belonging to the Forests of Temperate Europe group. The habitat classification of the European Nature Information System classifies the first type as belonging to subcontinental moss Pinus sylvestris forests, the second and the third type belong to subcontinental lichen Pinus sylvestris forests, while the fourth belongs to nemoral Pinus sylvestris mire forests.

Deciduous forest habitats cover minority of the forest area, mainly swamps, and include:

- Vaccinio-uliginosi-Betuletum-pubescentis birch bog forest,
- Ribeso-nigri-Alnetum alder carr,
- Fraxino-Alnetum riparian forest.

The occurrence of other phytocenoses such as for instance Betulo-Quercetum roboris, Molinio-Pinetum or Stellario-Carpinetum, is considered to be of fragmentary nature or in the form of deformed phytocenoses.

The forest belongs to the Baltic mixed forests ecoregion located in the European Continental Biogeographic Region, belonging to the temperate broadleaf and mixed forests biome of the Palearctic realm. The area is covered by the drainage basins of Brda and Wda, belonging to the Lower Vistula Basin, a part of the Vistula Basin emptying into the Baltic Sea, classified together with the rest of Central & Western Europe as temperate floodplain rivers and wetlands of the Palearctic realm.

=== Forestry ===
For the purposes of forestry, Poland is divided into eight nature and forest lands, divided into nature and forest mesoregions, largely based on the borders of geomorphological mesoregions. The bulk of Tuchola Forest is located in the 3rd Greater Polish-Pomeramian Nature and Forest Land, where the forest covers the Tuchola Forest nature and forest mesoregion formed by merging the Tuchola Forest and the Charzykowy Plain geomorphological mesoregions, with the northernmost part of the merged unit being detached to form a separate Zaborski nature and forest mesoregion, also covered by the forest. Other nature and forest mesoregions of the 2nd Land which are partially covered by the forest include the Świecie Plain, the Brda River Valley and the Krajna Lakeland nature and forest mesoregions.

A small, peripheral part of the forest lies in the 1st Baltic Nature and Forest Land, namely in parts of the Bytów Lakeland, the Kashubia Lakeland, and the Starogard Lakeland nature and forest mesoregions.

According to the European forest classification, the young Scots pine forests and the dry acidophilous Scots pine forests habitats are classified as Nemoral Scots pine forests, while the marshy pine forests are classified as conifer dominated or mixed mire forests.

The forest is managed by the Regional Directorates of State Forests in Toruń, Gdańsk, and (a small part only) Szczecinek, with the exception of the territory of the Tuchola Forest National Park, managed outside the State Forests entity by the park itself.

A south-eastern fragment of the forest located in the part managed by the Regional Directorate in Toruń has been designated the Tuchola Forest Promotional Forest Complex for the purposes of promoting sustainable forest management. Its primary objective is forest education, in the forms of outdoor lessons and guided tours, classes in forest education chambers, meetings with foresters at schools, meetings outside schools, educational events and actions, exhibitions, forest contests, festivities, fairs, etc., carried out by qualified foresters, known as the leaders of forest education, using dedicated facilities established in the forest, such as education centers, educational chambers, educational shelters, educational trails, educational points, and others. The complex also enables interdisciplinary research based on fully recognized forest environment, for the purposes improvement of forest management methods and setting acceptable limits on economic (commercial) interventions in forest ecosystems. It also allows for sports, recreation and leisure activities in the forest, unhampered by the restrictions typically imposed in a national park or a nature reserve.

=== Environmental protection ===
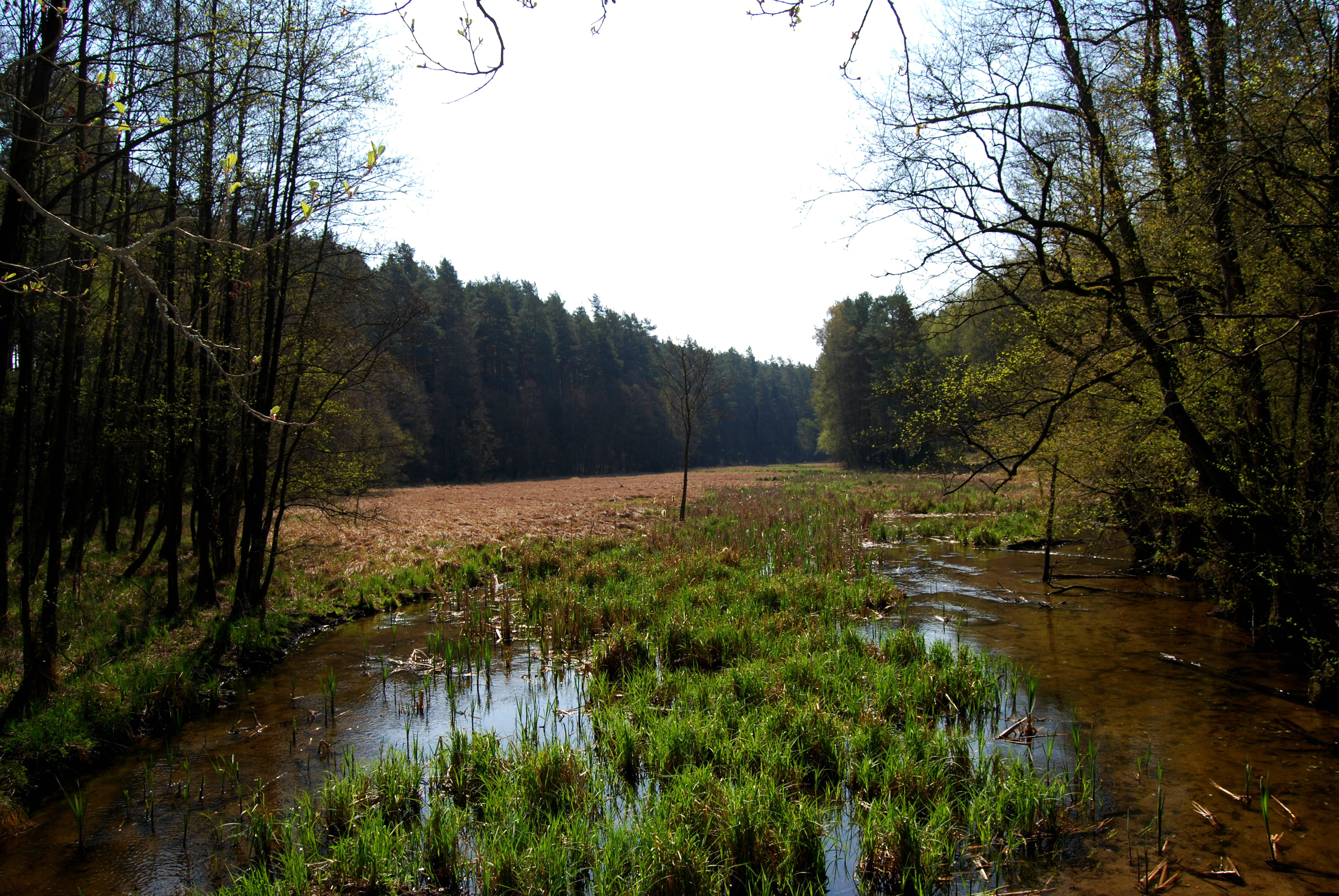
Bagna nad Stążką nature reserve

In June 2010 the Tuchola Forest area was designated by UNESCO as a Tuchola Forest Biosphere Reserve, grossly coextensive with the Tuchola Forest (Bory Tucholskie, PLB220009) and the Great Brda Sandar (Wielki Sandr Brdy, PLB220001) Natura 2000 Special Protection Areas combined, encompassing several smaller Natura 2000 Special Areas of Conservation, such as the Brda and Stążka Valley in Tuchola Forest (Dolina Brdy i Stążki w Borach Tucholskich, PLH040023), the Brda and Chocina Valley (Dolina Brdy i Chociny, PLH220058), the Brda Sandar (Sandr Brdy, PLH220026), the Wda Sandar (Sandr Wdy, PLH040017), Mętne (PLH220034), Wdzydze Lakes (Jeziora Wdzydzkie, PLH220057), the Zapceń Refuge (Ostoja Zapceńska, PLH220077), Młosino-Lubnia (PLH040023), or the Church in Śliwice (Kościół w Śliwicach, PLH040034). The nucleus of the Biosphere Reserve is protected by the Tuchola Forest National Park covering 46.13 square kilometres (17.81 sq mi) and of the 25 nature reserves lying within the buffer zone. The buffer zone includes Tuchola, Wda, Wdzydze and Zaborski Landscape Parks. There is also a transit zone which includes the town of Tuchola and surrounding districts. The core area of the Reserve covers 78.81 square kilometres (30.43 sq mi), and the three zones together cover 3,195 square kilometres (1,234 sq mi).

== Ethnocultural region ==
The term Tuchola Forest (Polish: Bory Tucholskie), understood as an ethnocultural region and a historical land of Poland, carries a much narrower geographical sense than the area covered by the actual forest. In this meaning, the designation refers exclusively to the part of the forest which is inhabited by the Tuchola Borowians (or Borowians), a Polish ethnographic group, comprising the area located roughly north-east of Chojnice (Rytel, Gutowiec, Czersk, Łąg), south of Czarna Woda (Osieczna, Osówek), north-west of Świecie (Świekatowo, Lniano, Drzycim), north-east of Sępólno Krajeńskie (Wałdowo, Przepałkowo), stretching south to the suburbs of Bydgoszcz (Koronowo, Pruszcz), encompassing the entire Tuchola County (Tuchola, Raciąż, Bysław, Cekcyn, Śliwice, Legbąd, Lińsk, Gostycyn, Kęsowo, Żalno, Lubiewo). Borowians speak the Tuchola Forest dialect (gwara borowiacka or gwara tucholska) of Polish belonging to the Greater Polish dialects, albeit under strong influence of Kashubian.

Prior to World War II, the western part of the region partially overlapped with the Kosznajderia, or Kosznajdry (in Polish) or Koschneiderei (in German), former ethnocultural region inhabited by a relatively secluded solid community of Catholic German settlers brought from the Prince-Bishopric of Osnabrück by the Teutonic Order State during its brief control of the area at the end the 14th century, who maintained their original culture (including clothing) and spoke Koschneiderisch, a distinct South-East-Pomeranian (German: Süd-Hinterpommersch) dialect of Low German which preserved many features of Westphalian dialect of Middle Low German (spoken by the original pioneer founding settlers), itself heavily influenced by the Middle Dutch.

Other areas of the forest (including the National Park) are inhabited by neighbouring ethnographic groups: Kashubians (including Krubans, Borans and Zaborans), Kociewians (including Lasans and Piaskarze) - approximately 30% of the area, as well as Krajnians.

=== Community-led local development ===
In order to co-ordinate in the region various development activities related to training courses, promotion of tourism to the region, promotion and marketing of regional products, promotion of regional cuisine, organizations of regional culture activities, festivities or contests, a Local Action Group ″Tuchola Forest″ (technically a union of associations) was established by several associations of public (including all gminas of the Tuchola County, the Tuchola County itself, as well as three gminas of the Świecie County), private (including commercial) and NGO sectors, which acted under the Local Action Plan as an operator of funds distributed from the LEADER programme of the European Agricultural Fund for Rural Development in the years 2007–2013. Beginning from the EU budget perspective 2014-2020 onwards, the law restricted the permitted legal form of LEADER/CLLD local action groups to an association (and not a union of associations), and therefore, the entity lost the official status of LEADER local action group. As a replacement, a new LEADER/CLLD programme local operator, the Partnership ″Local Action Group Tuchola Forest″ (technically a registered association), was established by local entities (this time only those located in the territory of the Tuchola County), including local self-government units, as well as private entities (including commercial ones) and those from the NGO sector. The original union of associations continues, however, its activities as a forum of discussion and cooperation in the entire region in- and outside the territory of Tuchola County, in forms such as conferences, training courses or contests, albeit funded from sources other than the LEADER programme, such as the funds received form territorial self-government units or government institutions. Similarly, the ″Borowiak Fishie″ Fishieries Local Action Group association operates the funds for the development of fisheries and fishing communities, allocated from the European Maritime, Fisheries and Aquaculture Fund. Other importąnt regional organizations include the Cultural Society of Borowiacy in Tuchola, the ″Promotion of Tuchola Forest″ Society for Regional Development, as well as the ″Tuchola Forest″ Association of Agri-Tourism Holdings.

== History ==
The area formed part of Poland since the establishment of the state in the 10th century, with a brief interruption during the occupation by the Teutonic Order State at the end of the 14th century. After the First Partition of Poland in 1772 the area was annexed by Prussia, and from 1871 it was part of the German Empire. Under German rule, near the village of Grupa, a military exercise area Truppenübungsplatz Gruppe was established, in which medical research was conducted, leading to publication of the name in scientific reports of the early 20th century. During World War I, pacifist doctor Georg Friedrich Nicolai was banished from Berlin to the remote area which had to be restored in 1919 to Poland as a result of the Treaty of Versailles, after Poland regained independence in November 1918.

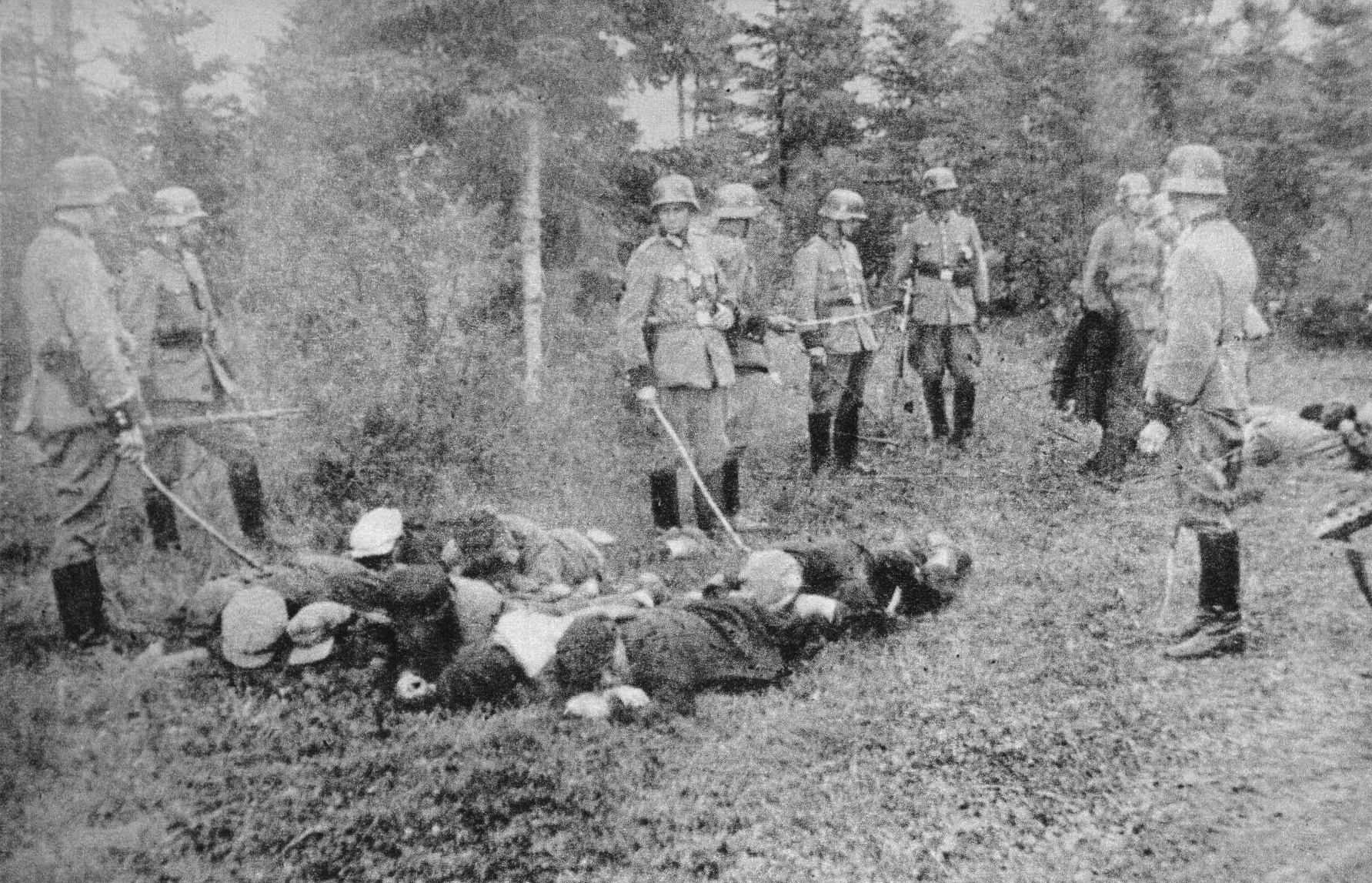
Rudzki Most massacre of Poles, carried out by Nazi Germany in 1939

In 1939, during the invasion of Poland at the very beginning of World War II, the major Battle of Tuchola Forest was fought in the area. Despite having cohabitated peacefully for centuries with their Polish, Kashubian or Jewish neighbours, Kosznajders succumbed to Nazi German propaganda during the increasing hostilities of the German Reich towards Poland in the months preceding the impeding invasion, when a number of them joined the Volksdeutscher Selbstschutz, participated in the preparation of Sonderfahndungsbuch Polen, or even played an active role in atrocities against Poles during the genocidal Intelligenzaktion Pommern conducted primarily in October and November 1939, when Germans murdered 335 Poles from Tuchola and Tuchola County in six large massacres known as the Rudzki Most massacre. Among the victims were teachers, school principals, merchants, craftsmen, farmers, priests, foresters, postmen, railwaymen, policemen and local officials, including mayor of Tuchola Stanisław Saganowski.

In the spring of 1944, in anticipation of the evacuation of SS-Truppenübungsplatz Heidelager from Pustków in the Sandomierz Forest, a military training ground was re-established at Wierzchucin in the Tuchola Forest under the name Truppenübungsplatz Westpreußen, code name "Heidekraut". After the previous test site near Blizna was captured by the advancing Red Army, between August 1944 and January 1945 SS troops under Hans Kammler and Walter Dornberger carried out extensive tests of the A-4 missiles (V-2 rockets). 265 V-2 missiles were launched, most of them in a southbound direction towards Chodzież, Ostrzeszów, Sieradz or Turek. For a short period, Rheinbote were also tested. The rockets were supplied from the underground Mittelwerk factory at the Nordhausen-Dora concentration camp. The logbooks recorded an incident with 9 casualties, among whom 7 were a German family from Berlin. In January 1945 the site had to be evacuated in its turn before the Red Army offensive overran the area.

After World War II, almost the entire population of Kosznajders fled or were expelled to Germany. The forest then became a safe haven for many Polish anti-communist partisans (Cursed soldiers), among them Zygmunt Szendzielarz.

== See also ==
- List of V-2 test launches
- Rocket launch site

== Bibliography ==
- Woźny, Jacek (2009), "Niemiecki poligon rakietowy „Heidekraut" w Borach Tucholskich. Przyczynek do archeologii wojennej regionu" (PDF), in Woźny, Jacek (ed.), Dziedzictwo techniczne Borów Tucholskich (in Polish), Bydgoszcz: Przedsiębiorstwo Marketingowe Logo, pp. 103–120
