= Świekatowo =

- Village
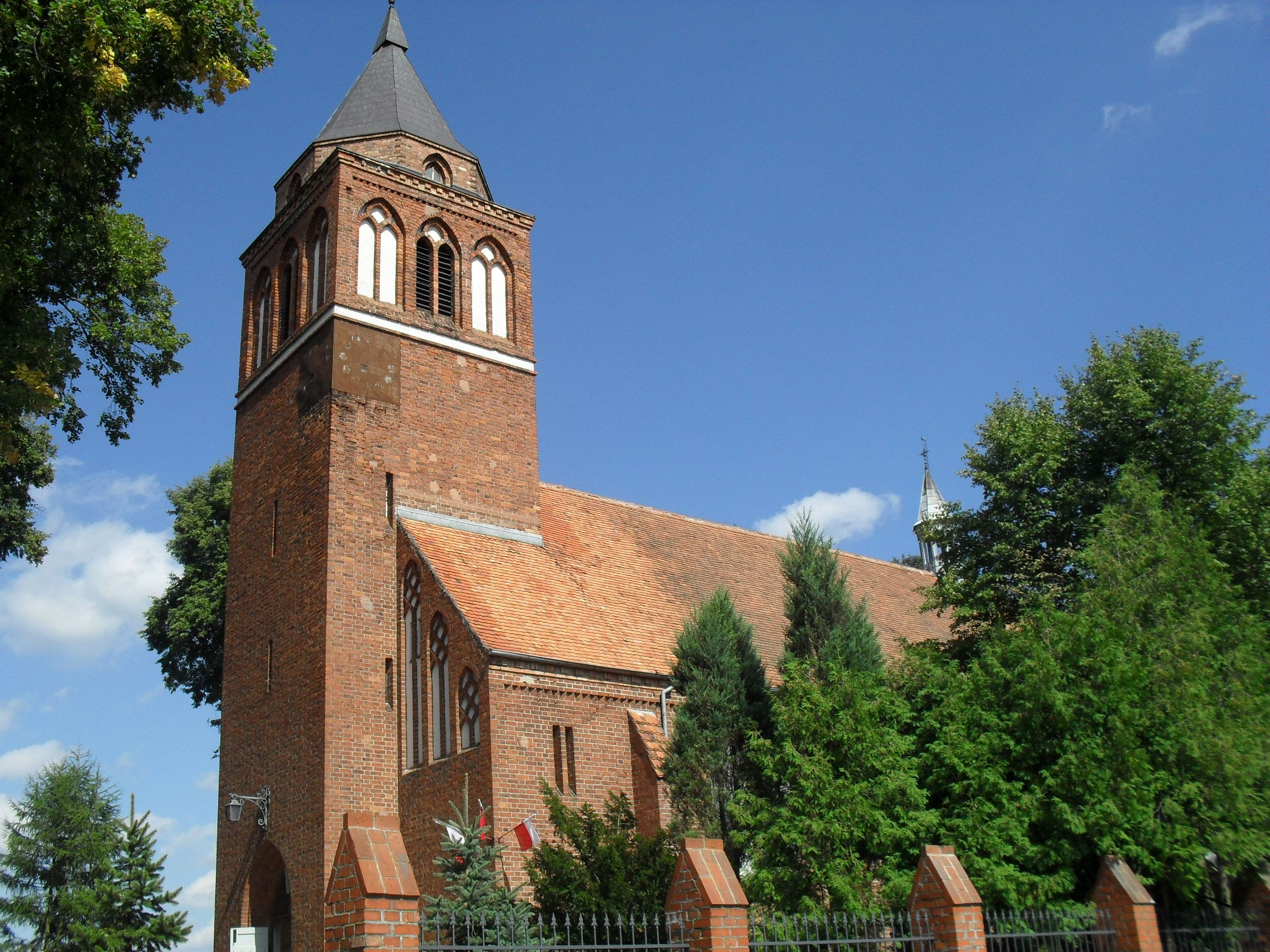
- Saint Martin church

- Coat of arms

- Location within Poland
- Coordinates: 53°25′11″N 18°5′32″E
- Country: Poland
- Voivodeship: Kuyavian-Pomeranian
- County: Świecie
- Gmina: Świekatowo
- First mentioned: 1277

Government
  - Mayor: Marek Topoliński
- Area: 64.7 km^{2} (25.0 sq mi)
- Elevation: 104 m (341 ft)
- Population: 1,700
  - Density: 26/km^{2} (68/sq mi)
- Time zone: UTC+1 (CET)
  - Summer (DST): UTC+2 (CEST)
- Postal code: 86-182
- Area code: (+48) 52
- Vehicle registration: CSW
- Website: www.bip.swiekatowo.lo.pl

Świekatowo (Polish: [ɕfjɛkaˈtɔvɔ]) is a village in Świecie County, Kuyavian-Pomeranian Voivodeship, in north-central Poland. It is the seat of the gmina (administrative district) called Gmina Świekatowo. It is located in the Tuchola Forest in the historic region of Pomerania.

== History ==
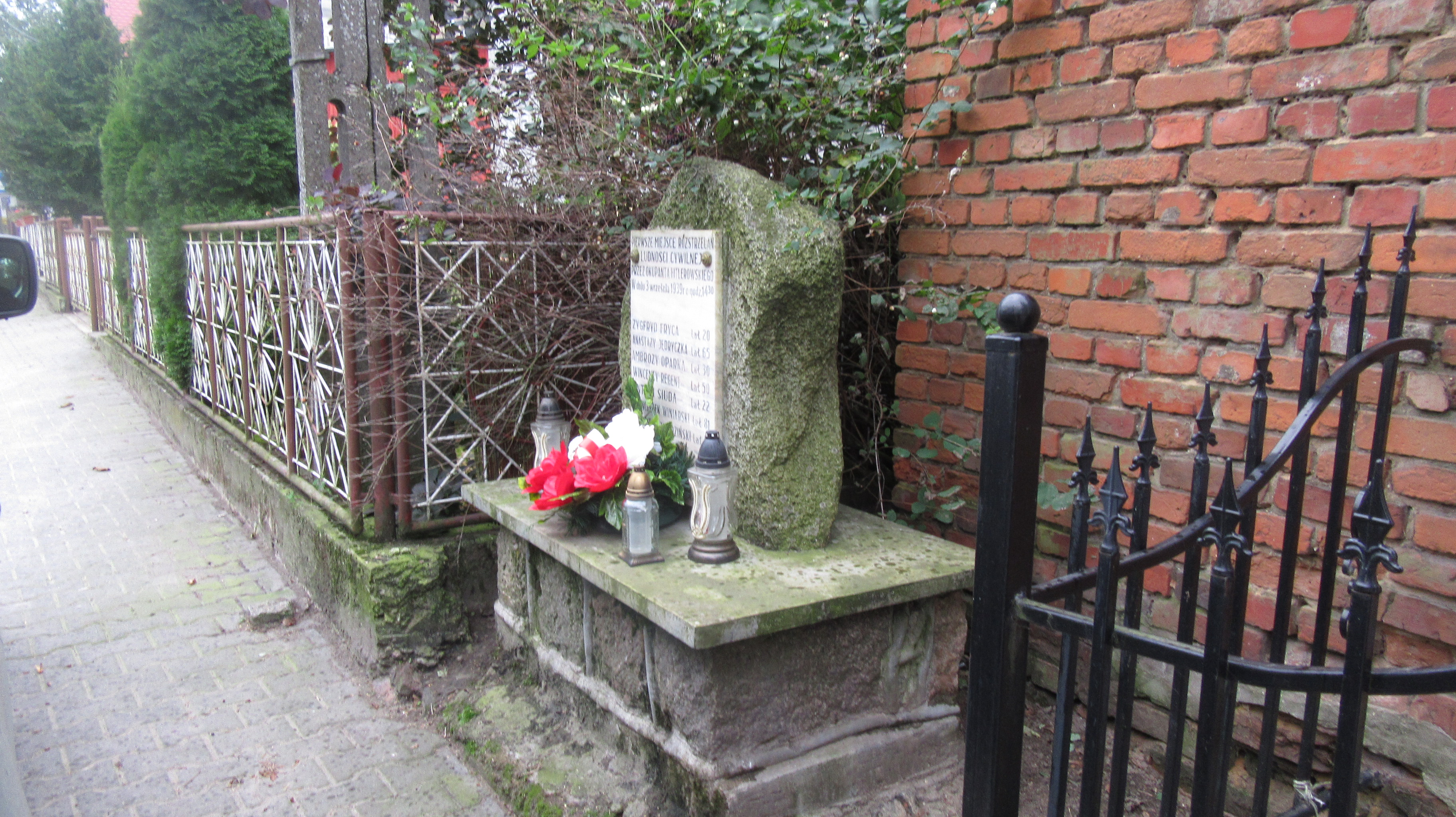
Memorial at the site of the German massacre of Poles from 3 September 1939

In the 10th century, the area became part of the emerging Polish state under the Piast dynasty. The oldest known mention of the village comes from 1277, when it was granted by Duke Mestwin II to the Diocese of Włocławek. It was invaded and occupied by the Teutonic Order in the 14th century. In 1454, the region was reincorporated to the Kingdom of Poland by King Casimir IV Jagiellon upon the request of the anti-Teutonic Prussian Confederation. After the Second Peace of Thorn in 1466, the Teutonic Order renounced any claims to the region and recognized it as part of Poland. Świekatowo was a private church village of the Diocese of Włocławek, administratively located in the Świecie County in the Pomeranian Voivodeship of the Kingdom of Poland. In 1686, it was visited by Bishop Bonawentura Madaliński. It was administered by the chapter of the Diocese of Włocławek until the First Partition of Poland in 1772, when it was annexed by the Kingdom of Prussia.

The village, under the Germanized name Schwekatowo, was also part of Germany from 1871, within which it administratively belonged to the district of Schwetz in the province of West Prussia. According to the German census of 1910, it had a population of 814, of which 407 (50%) were Germans and 407 (50%) were Poles. Following World War I, Poland regained independence in 1918, and the village was restored by Germany to the Second Polish Republic in 1920 per the Treaty of Versailles.

During the German invasion of Poland, which started World War II in 1939, German forces on 3 September murdered 26 Poles. The massacre happened as Poles were attending a church mass from which they were dragged out by German soldiers and shot (see Nazi crimes against the Polish nation). From 1939 to 1945, under German occupation, the village belonged to the administrative region of Marienwerder in the newly formed province of Reichsgau Danzig-West Prussia. In 1941, the occupiers carried out expulsions of Poles, who were then placed in a transit camp in Tczew for three weeks, and afterwards deported to the Warsaw District of the General Government in the more eastern part of German-occupied Poland, while their houses and farms were handed over to German colonists as part of the Lebensraum policy. In 1942, the village was renamed Schweike to erase traces of Polish origin. Towards the end of World War II, it was captured by the Red Army and was restored to Poland.

== Transport ==
There is a train station in the village, located on the Polish Railway Line No. 201, part of the important Polish Coal Trunk-Line.

== Sports ==
The local football club is Fala Świekatowo. It competes in the lower leagues.
