= Szewno =

- Village
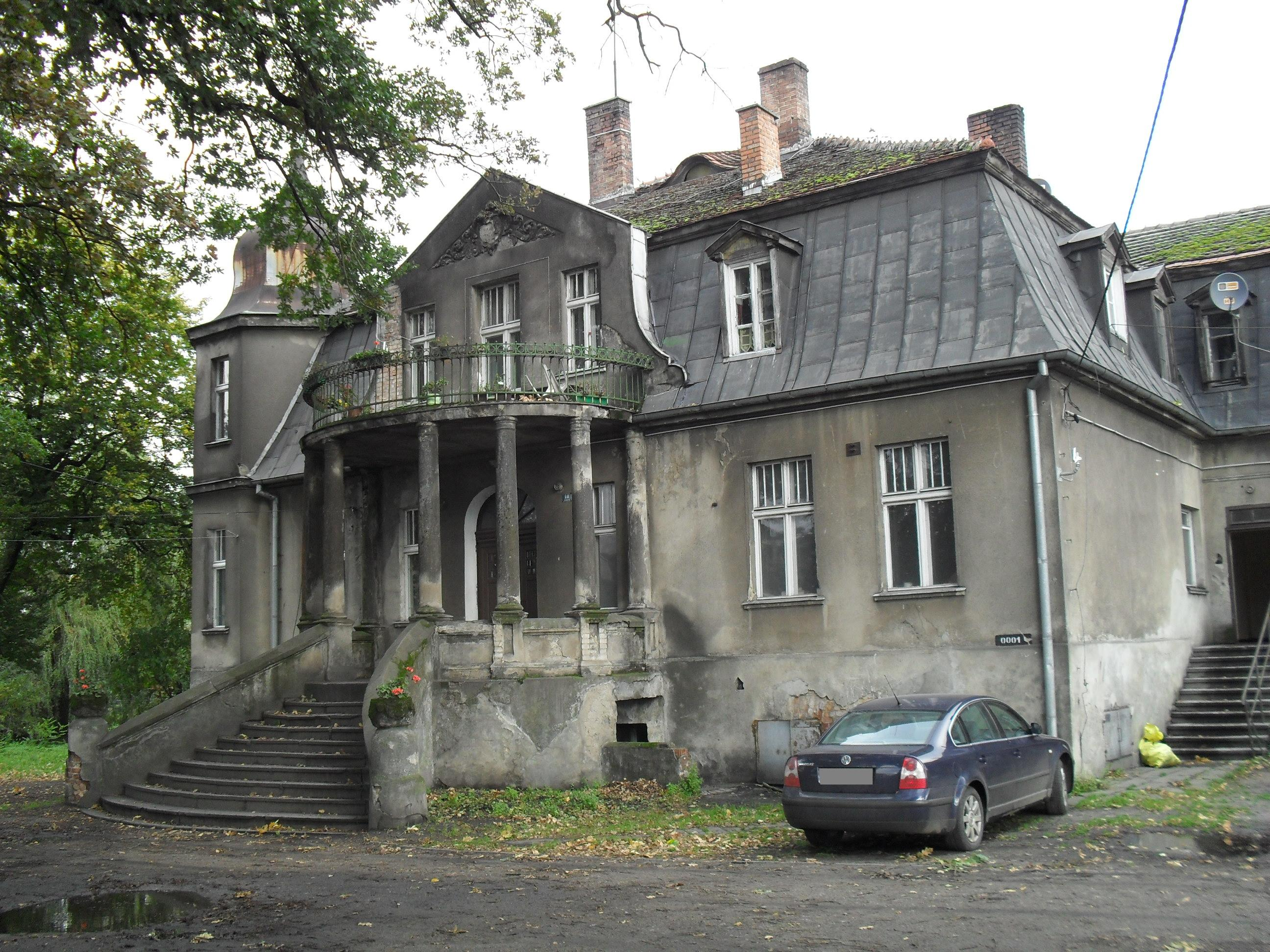
- Former manor house

- Location within Poland
- Coordinates: 53°26′20″N 18°9′23″E
- Country: Poland
- Voivodeship: Kuyavian-Pomeranian
- County: Świecie
- Gmina: Świekatowo

Population
  - Total: 290

Szewno [ˈʂɛvnɔ] is a village in the administrative district of Gmina Świekatowo, within Świecie County, Kuyavian-Pomeranian Voivodeship, in north-central Poland.
