= Małe Łąkie =

- Village
- Location within Poland
- Coordinates: 53°24′00″N 18°04′35″E
- Country: Poland
- Voivodeship: Kuyavian-Pomeranian
- County: Świecie
- Gmina: Świekatowo

Małe Łąkie [ˈmawɛ ˈwɔŋkʲɛ] is a village in the administrative district of Gmina Świekatowo, within Świecie County, Kuyavian-Pomeranian Voivodeship, in north-central Poland.
