= Lubania-Lipiny =

- Village
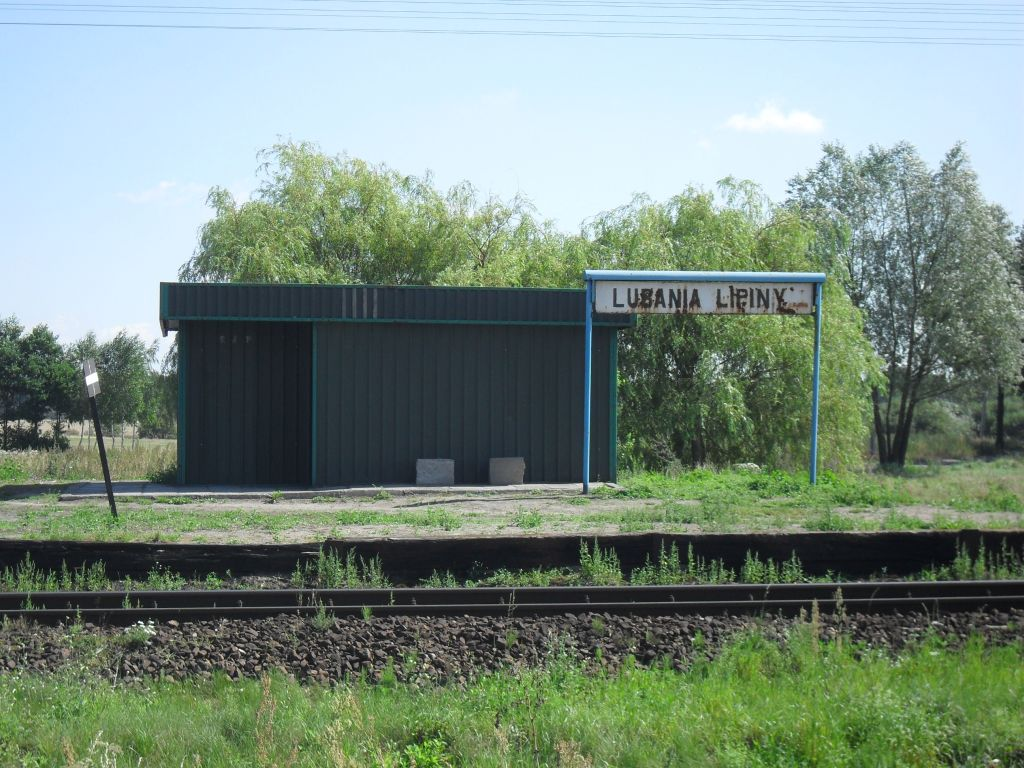
- Railway station in Lubania Lipiny

- Location within Poland
- Coordinates: 53°23′53″N 18°06′46″E
- Country: Poland
- Voivodeship: Kuyavian-Pomeranian
- County: Świecie
- Gmina: Świekatowo

Lubania-Lipiny [luˈbaɲa liˈpinɨ] is a village in the administrative district of Gmina Świekatowo, within Świecie County, Kuyavian-Pomeranian Voivodeship, in north-central Poland.
