= Lipienica, Świecie County =

Village in Kociewie

Lipienica
- Village
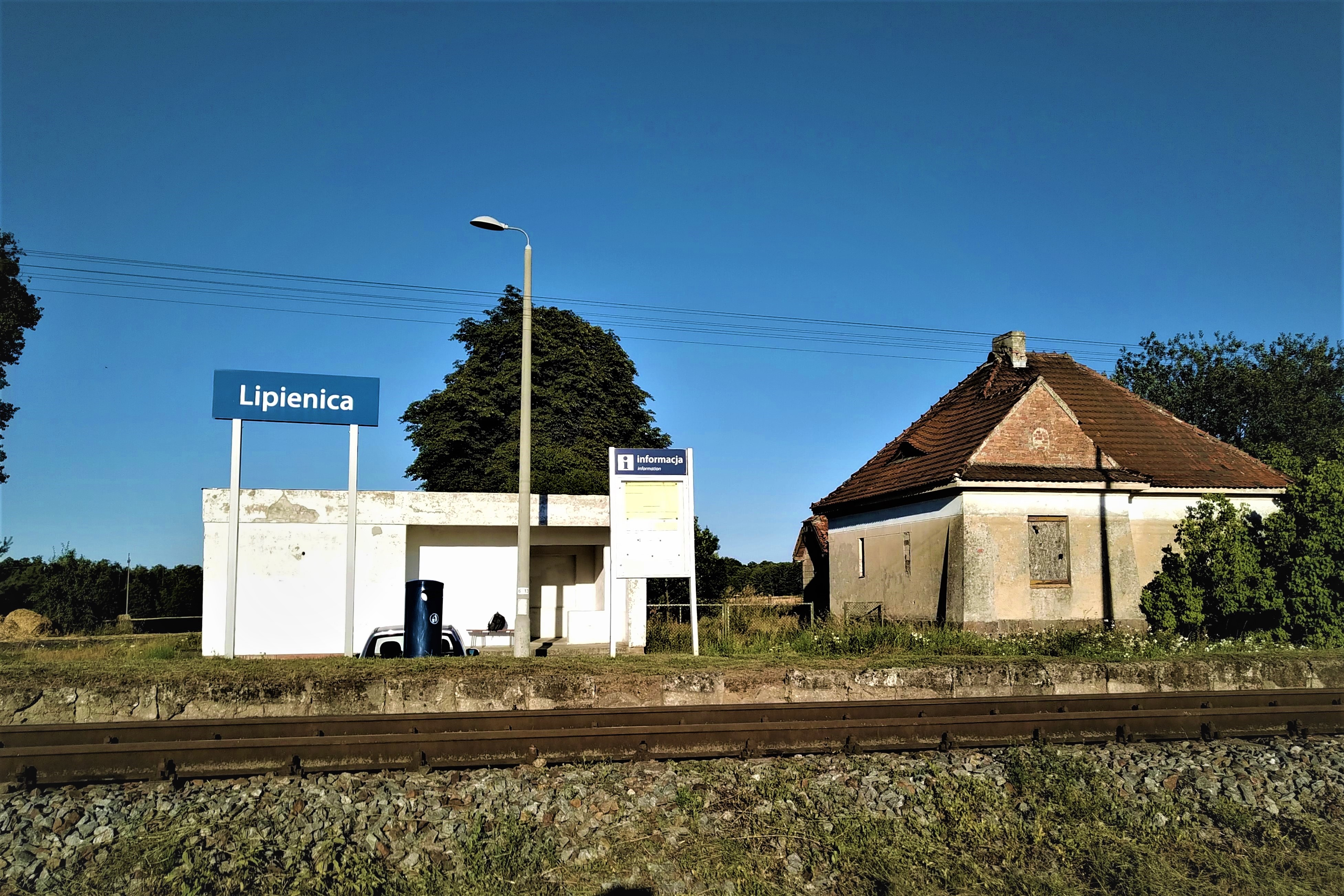
- The railway station at Lipienica

- Location within Poland
- Coordinates: 53°27′N 18°7′E
- Country: Poland
- Voivodeship: Kuyavian-Pomeranian
- County: Świecie
- Gmina: Świekatowo

Lipienica [lipjɛˈnit͡sa] (German: Lipinitza)is a village in the administrative district of Gmina Świekatowo, within Świecie County, Kuyavian-Pomeranian Voivodeship, in north-central Poland.

== Historic monuments ==
- Manor park dating from the mid-19th century, listed in the register of historic monuments under No. 200/A on 15 December 1986.
- Manor park dating from the 17th–19th centuries, listed in the register of historic monuments under No. A/201/1 on 10 March 1987.
