= Erazm Parczewski =

Polish activist

Erazm Parczewski (1826, Ociąż – 1915) was a Polish activist. He was a member of the Reichstag as a representative of the Polish Party.
