= Zalesie Królewskie =

- Village
- Location within Poland
- Coordinates: 53°27′N 18°7′E
- Country: Poland
- Voivodeship: Kuyavian-Pomeranian
- County: Świecie
- Gmina: Świekatowo
- Population: 685

Zalesie Królewskie [zaˈlɛɕɛ kruˈlɛfskʲɛ] is a village in the administrative district of Gmina Świekatowo, within Świecie County, Kuyavian-Pomeranian Voivodeship, in north-central Poland.
