= Przechowo =

Dzielnica of Świecie

- Dzielnica
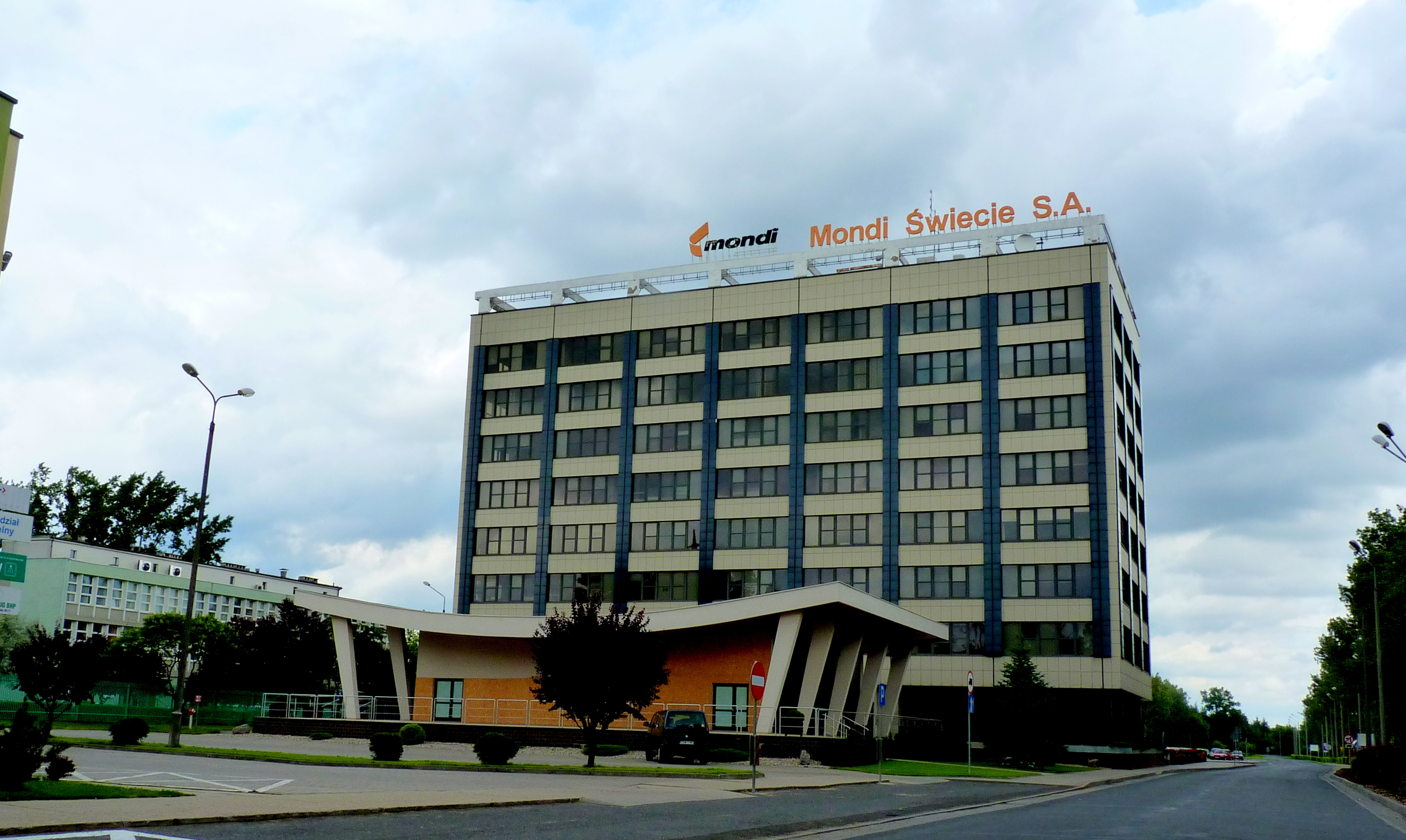
- Mondi paper factory main building

- Location within Poland
- Coordinates: 53°24′20″N 18°24′14″E
- Country: Poland
- Voivodeship: Kuyavian-Pomeranian
- County: Świecie
- Gmina: Świecie
- Population: c. 4,000

Przechowo is a district of Świecie, located in the west of the town. The population is over 4,000 residents. The town's main industrial plants of Mondi (paper industry), the Provimi dairy, and brickworks are located here.

== Etymology ==
The first mention of the village dates back to about 1338 and likely stems from the word przechowywać, or "overwintering" of raftsmen who sought refuge there from the Vistula's floodwaters. Earlier names of the village include Przechow (1338), Pczechaw (1415), and Schönau (German).

== History ==
=== Early history (1880s-1900s) ===
Around 1888, the village had 829 inhabitants and 2,693.15 Magdeburg morgens, or about 687 hectares today. At that time, the described complex, along with the manor house, already existed. It was called Przechowski Folwark, or in German, Marienhoehe. This name has survived to the present day, in the form of "Marianki", which is now a name for a neighboring dzielnica.

=== School strikes ===
In the first half of November 1906, a children’s strike against teaching religion in German took place at a local elementary school. The participants of the strike are familiar with the names of the following children: S. Schmidt, B. Kruszyński, Gołębiewska. The strike was part of a much larger passive resistance against the Prussian school authorities, which at the turn of 1906 and 1907 included more than 460 schools in the province of West Prussia, i.e. pre-partition Pomerania Gdańsk, Powiśle, Chełmno land and Lubavian land and part of Krajna. The inspiration for the Pomeranian strikes were the earlier actions of children in the Wielkopolska province, with the famous Września children strike at the forefront.

=== Przechowo as part of Świecie ===
Between 1954 and 1961 the village was the seat of the Przechowo gromada, and after its abolition, it was incorporated into the town of Świecie. The gromada existed until December 31, 1961.

On November 30, 2018, the General Directorate for National Roads and Motorways signed a contract with Strabag for the reconstruction of national road no. 91 in Przechowo. At a cost of nearly PLN 78 million (originally PLN 71 million), the old viaduct was demolished in spring 2019 and replaced with a new 270-meter-long viaduct, additionally the entire road system was rebuilt, including the construction of a roundabout and pedestrian underpass. The original planned opening date for the new road system was May 2020, and was later moved to late August 2020. It eventually happened on September 4, 2020.
