= Tuchola Forest National Park =

National park in Poland

- Park Narodowy Bory Tucholskie
- IUCN category II (national park)
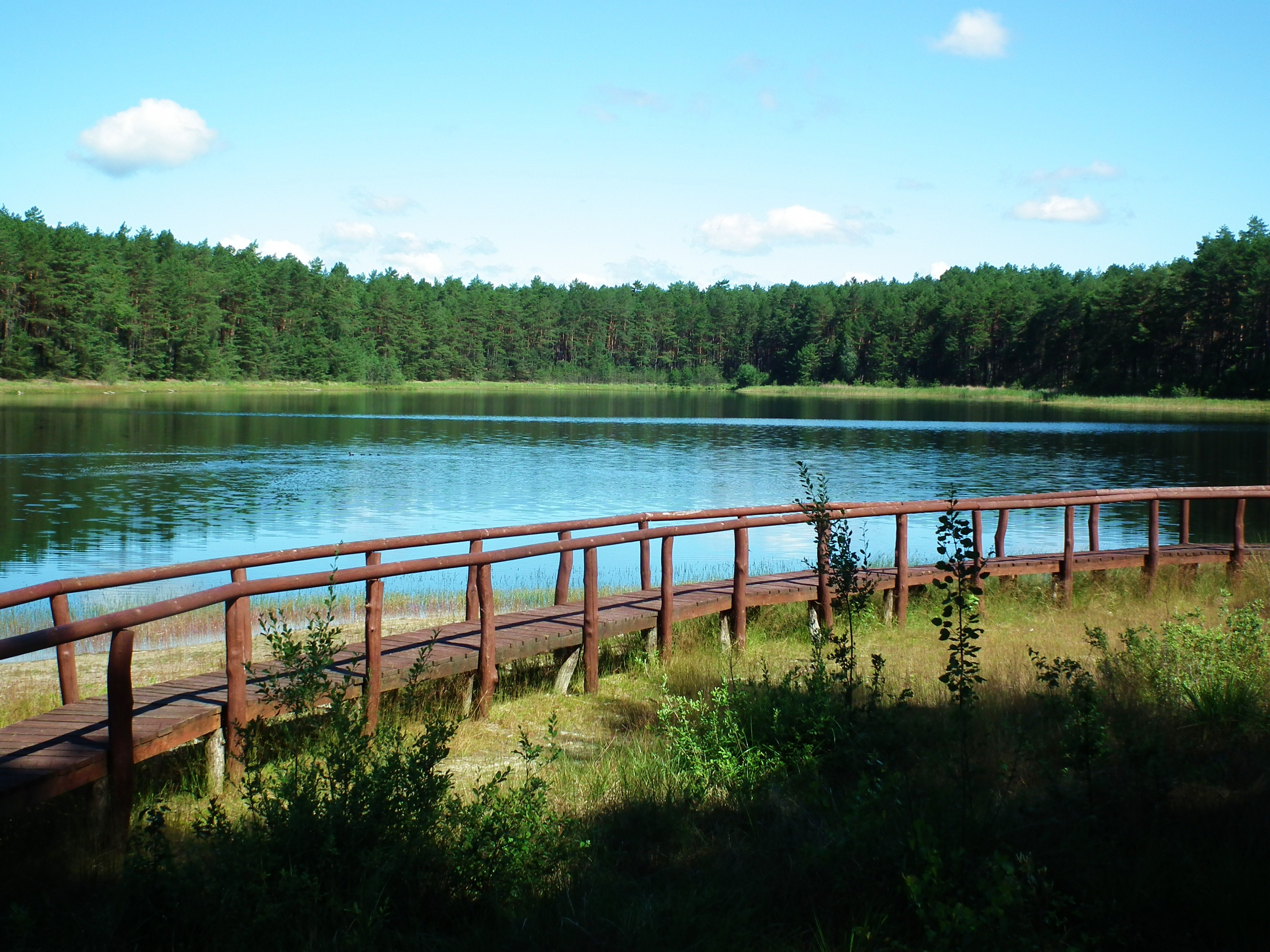
- Gacno Lake at Tuchola Forests Park logo with Wood Grouse

- Location within Poland
- Location: Pomeranian Voivodeship, Poland
- Coordinates: 53°26′09″N 17°18′11″E
- Area: 46.13 km^{2} (17.81 sq mi)
- Established: 1996
- Governing body: Ministry of the Environment
- Website: Official website

Tuchola Forest National Park (Polish: Park Narodowy Bory Tucholskie) is a national park in Poland, created on 1 July 1996. It covers an area of 46.13 square kilometres (17.81 sq mi) of forests, lakes, meadows and peatlands. The park is in the northern part of Poland, in Chojnice County in Pomeranian Voivodeship, in the heart of the Tuchola Forest, the largest woodland in Poland. It is surrounded by a larger protected area called Zaborski Landscape Park. The park forms the core of the Tuchola Forest Biosphere Reserve, designated by UNESCO in 2010.

== Area ==
The first proposal stipulated that the national park would cover 130 square kilometres, but after discussions with local authorities it was decided that the borders would cover only the area of the so-called Seven Lakes Stream (Struga Siedmiu Jezior). All of the land incorporated into the national park belonged to the state, and not to private individuals. Forests, meadows, and peatlands had been part of Forest Preserve Rytel and the lakes had been administered by the State Agency of Agricultural Land.

== Features ==
The area of the Tuchola Forest was shaped by the Scandinavian Glacier; for the most part, it is covered by sandy plains. These plains are diversified by dunes and lakes. The lakes are long and narrow, creating channels, of which the longest is 17 km. The soil in the park is of poor quality.

There are more than 20 lakes in the park, some of them are pristine, of crystal-clear waters (e.g., Gacno Wielkie and Male, Nierybno, Gluche). Around 25 species of fish can be found here as well as Eurasian beavers.

The national park is a heaven for birds — there are 144 species, including crane and eagle owl. The symbol of the park — the western capercaillie — until recently was common in the area, especially in the Forest District of Klosnowo. Now, authorities of the national park, plan to reintroduce this bird. A particularly important part of fauna are bats: several species thrive in the park.

== Tourism ==
Most important tourist centers of Tuchola Forest are by the Charzykowskie and Karsinskie lakes. In recent years agro-tourism has become popular, e.g., in the village of Swornegacie. The Brda river is a kayaking trail.

Charzykowy is famous as the birthplace of Polish inland yachting. Lake Charzykowy offers good yachting conditions in summer and winter. There are bicycle trails that let tourists get acquainted with Tuchola Forest's attractions. Moreover, the Tuchola Forest is crossed by walking trails — among them the Kaszubski Trail from Chojnice to Wiela.

== Bibliography ==
- Begni, Gerard (2002). Observing Our Environment From Space. Lisse: Swets and Zeitlinger.
- (1997). "Environmental Protection Improves, Says Zelichowski." Poland News Bulletin. January 13.
