= Rudzki Most massacre =

Nazi mass executions near Tuchola, Poland

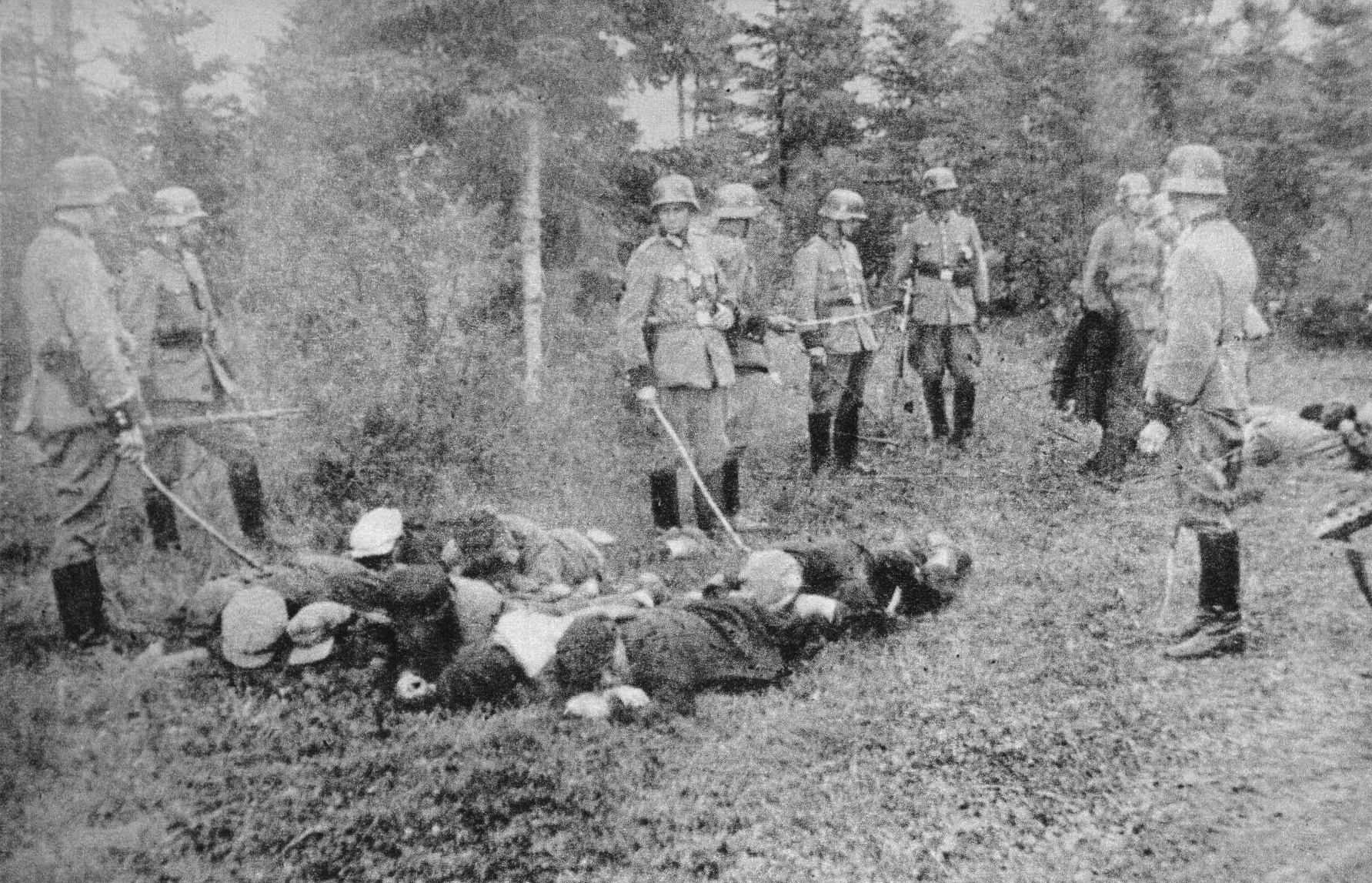
- One of the mass executions at Rudzki Most
- Location: 53°34′19.3″N 17°52′42.5″E; Rudzki Most, near Tuchola, German-occupied Poland
- Date: 24 October–11 November 1939
- Attack type: Mass shooting
- Deaths: At least 237
- Perpetrators: SS, Selbstschutz

The Rudzki Most massacre was a series of mass executions carried out by the German occupiers between 24 October and 11 November 1939 in the Rudzki Most wilderness near Tuchola.

On 21 October 1939, a fire broke out at the farm of Hugo Fritz – a Volksdeutscher from Piastoszyn, appointed by the occupation authorities to the position of commissioner in the Raciąż district – destroying part of the farm buildings. That same night, the farmer suffered a fatal heart attack. Despite the lack of any evidence, the Germans accused local Poles of setting fire to the farm and causing Fritz's death. This incident served as a pretext for the mass arrest of people who were considered to be part of the so-called Polish leadership, as well as farmers from nearby villages. The prisoners were systematically shot in the Rudzki Most wilderness area near Tuchola. Mass executions took place there on 24 October, 27 October, 30 October, 2 November, 6 November (probably), and 10–11 November 1939. The perpetrators were the victims' neighbours – members of the paramilitary Selbstschutz commanded by SS officers.

After the war, six mass graves containing 237 bodies were found in Rudzki Most. However, according to some sources, the number of victims was higher and could have reached 250, 335, or even 560 people.

== Beginning of the occupation ==
Wehrmacht units entered Tuchola on the evening of 2 September 1939. German police, state, and party authorities were very quickly established in the town and county. As early as 4 September, government councillor Marbach from Piła was appointed provisional starosta of the counties of Sępólno, Wyrzysk, and Tuchola (with his seat in Sępólno Krajeńskie). His representative in Tuchola was Willi Loer. (Note: He is described in some sources as the "acting county head" of Tuchola (Kozłowski (1987, p. 17)).) On 5 September, a local Volksdeutscher, Bruno Marten (Marszewski), was appointed provisional mayor of Tuchola.

These officials held their positions for a very short time, as the Danzig Gauleiter of the NSDAP, Albert Forster, who on 5 September 1939 assumed the position of head of the civil administration of the German 4th Army, soon made a number of changes in the municipal and county authorities. Already in the first ten days of September, Otto Hess, who had arrived from the Free City of Danzig, took over the position of starosta of the Tuchola County. At the same time, he became the head of the county structures of the NSDAP (Kreisleiter), while a person named Wichmann took over the position of mayor of Tuchola. On 25 October 1939, military administration was abolished in the occupied areas, and Tuchola and the county were incorporated into the Reich as part of the Reichsgau Danzig-West Prussia's Bydgoszcz District.

A Gestapo post was established in the building at 53 Świecka Street in Tuchola. According to Włodzimierz Jastrzębski, its staff initially consisted mainly of young Nazis – students of the Technical University of the Free City of Danzig – who arrived in Tuchola with Otto Hess. German reports indicate that between 24 and 26 September, Einsatzkommando 16 post was organized in Tuchola – a special operational group of the SD and Security Police formed in Gdańsk. At the end of October, the Gdańsk Gestapo officers were replaced by functionaries sent from various cities of the Reich, commanded by Riefen from Königsberg. Posts of the Order Police and Gendarmerie were also established in Tuchola, whose officers served in the city and in the rural areas of the county, respectively.

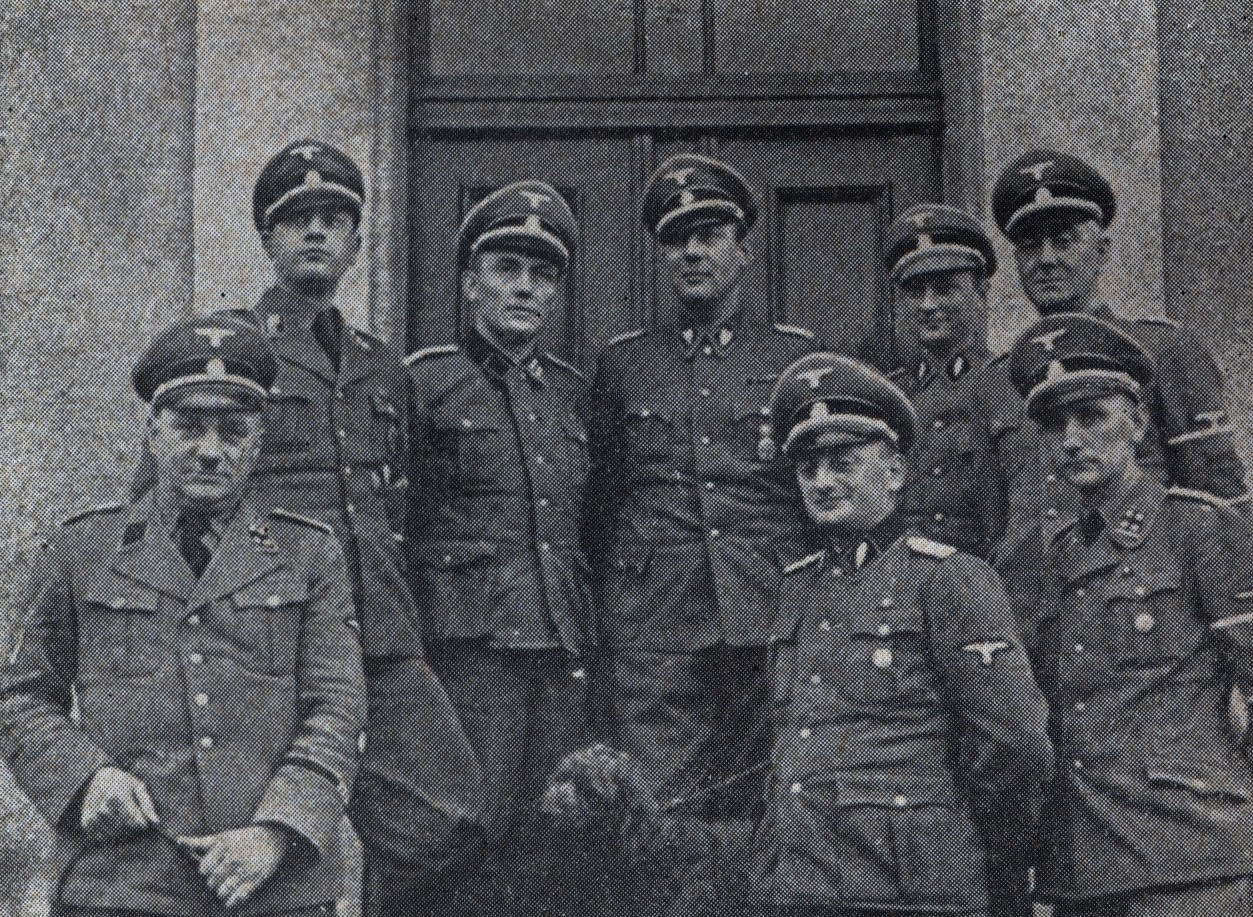
Command of the Selbstschutz Westpreussen. In the front row, second from the right, SS-Standartenführer Heinrich Mocek – head of the Selbstschutz inspectorate in Chojnice, whose area of operation included the Tuchola County

On 4 September 1939, Selbstschutz structures were established in the Tuchola County. Their founder and first commander was a local German, Kurt Merten-Feddeler. The Selbstschutz was a paramilitary police force composed of Germans who were citizens of pre-war Poland. In terms of organization, the Tuchola Selbstschutz was subordinated to the 4th Selbstschutz inspectorate, based in Chojnice. This inspectorate covered three counties – Chojnice, Sępólno, and Tuchola – and was headed by SS-Standartenführer Heinrich Mocek. The Selbstschutz militias from the counties of Sępólno and Tuchola soon received a single county commander (Kreisführer), SS-Standartenführer Wilhelm Richardt, based in Sępólno Krajeńskie. This solution, unusual for the Selbstschutz's organizational structure, was probably adopted due to the fact that the German population in the Tuchola County was very small (only 7.7% of the inhabitants).

Several local Selbstschutz centers operated simultaneously in the Tuchola County. Włodzimierz Jastrzębski states that several dozen fighters served in their ranks. According to Wacław Kozłowski, the Selbstschutz structures in the county had about 220 members. One of the largest and most active was the center in Bagienica, commanded by Kurt Gehrt (Note: Some sources spell his name as "Gerth" (Kozłowski (1987, pp. 20, 26, 33)).) – a farm owner and active member of the Jungdeutsche Partei. The county Selbstschutz headquarters (Dienststelle Selbstschutz) was located at 53 Świecka Street, in the same building that housed the Gestapo post.

From the first days of the occupation, Germanization policy was ruthlessly implemented in the city and county. All Polish cultural and educational institutions, including schools, libraries, and the regional museum, were closed down. Polish organizations and associations were also dissolved, and the publication of Polish-language newspapers and other printed materials was prohibited. All street names were Germanized, and the population was forbidden to use the Polish language in public places and workplaces. Polish-owned businesses, workshops, real estate, and farms were confiscated.

== German terror against the population of Tuchola County ==
In the early days of the occupation, a "people's tribunal" (Volkstribunal) was organized in Tuchola. It was headed by an unknown Gestapo officer and consisted of local Germans and officials of the occupying authorities, including County Administrator Hess and the later mayor Paul Lange. The tasks of the "tribunal" included searching for and sentencing to death people who were considered "enemies of Germany" and "fanatical Poles."

Mass arrests in the town and county began as early as 7 September 1939. Initially, the detained Poles were placed in the court prison in Tuchola, located at the corner of Świecka and Dworcowa streets. By the end of September, around 150 people had passed through its cells. The prison quickly became overcrowded, so the detainees were also placed in the gymnasium on Karasiewicz Street and in the barracks on Nowodworski Street. In addition, before 5 September, the Wehrmacht established an internment camp on one of the farms in the village of Drożdzienica, where Poles and Jews were imprisoned.

However, the most important place of detention for people arrested in the Tuchola County was the internment camp in Radzim near Kamień Krajeński. It was organized by the Selbstschutz in mid-September, on the estate belonging to Stefania Seyda. At the turn of September and October, Polish prisoners who had previously been held in Tuchola began to be transported there. In mid-October, prisoners from the liquidated camp in Drożdzienica were transferred there as well. Internierungslager Resmin mainly held residents of the Sępólno and Tuchola counties. In some cases, prisoners also included residents of the Chojnice, Wyrzysk, Bydgoszcz, and Kościerzyna counties. Among the imprisoned were mostly representatives of the Polish intelligentsia, political and social activists, uniformed services personnel, soldiers returning from the September Campaign, farmers – especially settlers from eastern and central Poland – as well as people denounced by local Germans due to neighborhood feuds and misunderstandings. On average, there were about a thousand prisoners in the camp.

The camp in Radzim was, in fact, an extermination center. Living and sanitary conditions there were extremely harsh, and prisoners were forced to perform hard labor, often humiliating and meaningless. Guards constantly abused detainees. Mass and individual executions took place on the camp grounds. In 1947, nine mass graves were discovered there, containing the remains of 113 people. Among the identified victims of the camp in Radzim and its sub-camp in Komierowo were 16 residents of the Tuchola County.

In the autumn of 1939, mass and individual executions also took place in the Tuchola County. Among others, two Poles were shot in the prison in Tuchola (on 28 September and 4 October). In October, the Selbstschutz murdered 17 prisoners from the camp in Radzim in a forest near the village of Krajenki. Another four Poles and Jews were shot in two executions that took place in a forest near Lińsk. Executions also occurred in a suburban forest near Polna Street in Tuchola (27 September, two victims), in a swamp on the border between Żalno and Siciny (September, two victims), on a forest road from Brzeźno to Osieczna (September, two victims), and in other places.

In September, members of the Tuchola Selbstschutz murdered all Jews living in the town, including women and children. The number of victims reached 47 people. Most were murdered in a mass execution that took place near the present-day Sępoleńska Street, on a field belonging to Kurt Merten-Feddeler.

Arrests intensified rapidly in mid-October. The Germans intended to eliminate the Polish intelligentsia, whom Adolf Hitler and the Nazis blamed for the Polonization policy pursued in the Western Borderlands in the interwar period, and whom they treated as the most serious obstacle to the quick and complete Germanization of the conquered territories. However, the group of the "Polish leadership" (Führungsschicht) designated for liquidation did not include only educated people or those belonging to the upper social classes, but all individuals active in social life and enjoying authority among the Polish population. In addition to teachers, Catholic clergy, civil servants, entrepreneurs, landowners, lawyers, journalists, retired officers, and uniformed services personnel, the victims included members of organizations and associations promoting Polishness, such as the Polish Western Union, the Maritime and Colonial League, the Shooting Brotherhood, the Association of Insurgents and Veterans, the Riflemen's Association, and the Sokół Gymnastic Society. Many merchants, farmers, and craftsmen were also among the victims, as the Volksdeutsche serving in the ranks of the Selbstschutz took advantage of the opportunity to settle long-standing neighborhood disputes and scores, as well as to seize the property belonging to the arrested and murdered Poles.

In the Tuchola County, the "ethnic cleansing of the advance area" was initiated with the imprisonment of a large group of Polish teachers. They were arrested on 13 or 14 October, when they appeared in Tuchola at the request of the German authorities to take part in an alleged "teaching conference." Kurt Gehrt, the Selbstschutz leader from Bagienica, played an important role in the arrest of the teachers.

== Fire at Hugo Fritz's farm ==
Shortly after the occupation began, the German authorities appointed Hugo Fritz, the owner of a large farm in Piastoszyn, to the position of commissioner of the administrative district in Raciąż. At the same time, he became the local "peasant leader" (Ortsbauernführer). Fritz used his official positions to confiscate livestock from Polish farmers, which he then distributed to German farmers.

On Saturday, 21 October, the Amtkommissar went to Silno, where, accompanied by another Volksdeutscher – the butcher Birkner (Brzeziński) – he drank large amounts of alcohol. Before evening, his employee Willi Tesz drove him back to his family farm. Witnesses noted that Fritz had a lit cigar with him. At that time, a dance party organized by Fritz's daughters was taking place on the farm. At around 8:00 PM or 8:30 PM, it was noticed that one of the barns had caught fire. The farmer tried to save a motorcycle standing nearby, but suffered a fatal heart attack. In the meantime, the fire consumed the second barn and the pigsty.

Almost immediately after the fire broke out, two young Polish women, sisters Bronisława and Stanisława Deutschman, were interrogated. Both of them, along with their mother and brother Franciszek, worked on Fritz's farm. They were accused of starting the fire by the deceased's daughter, Eleonora, who disliked them. After a few days, both sisters were arrested. 10 residents of Piastoszyn and Żalno were also detained, including Franciszek Deutschman. In the meantime, the German authorities and the local population organized a public funeral for Fritz. The arrested Poles were charged with arson and causing the death of the Amtkommissar. The defendants appeared before a military court of inquiry, composed of three Wehrmacht officers. It deliberated at Władysław Szpajda's inn in Żalno. At the trial, which took place on 23 October, the court acquitted all the defendants, finding no incriminating evidence against them.

At this point, however, SS-Standartenführer Heinrich Mocek, commander of the 4th Selbstschutz Inspectorate in Chojnice, intervened. He ordered the Poles acquitted by the summary court to be detained again and, at the same time, ordered the arrest of another 40 residents of nearby villages. He also informed the commander of the Selbstschutz Westpreussen, SS-Oberführer Ludolf von Alvensleben, about the entire matter. In response, the latter ordered:

Every third day, 40 Poles are to be shot until the perpetrator of the fire is found. Ten more Poles are to be taken for execution each time, then released for three days to search for the perpetrators of the fire. If they do not find them, they are to be shot first in the next execution.

Following von Alvensleben's order, local Selbstschutz structures began mass arrests of Poles in Grochowo, Piastoszyn, Raciąż, Stobno, and Żalno on 23 October. Around 50 people were detained. The detainees were first gathered in Szpajda's inn in Żalno, from where they were taken to the prison in Tuchola that same evening.

Polish sources usually take it as established fact that it was an intoxicated Fritz who started the fire on his farm by carelessly handling a lit cigar. This version was reportedly stated by both Polish and German farm workers. It was also cited by Bruno Marten, the temporary mayor of Tuchola, when he testified at the trial of the perpetrators of the Rudzki Most massacre, which took place in West Germany in 1965. However, Edward Skibiński notes that while witnesses recorded that Fritz dropped a lit cigar when he drove his carriage into the barn, it was another barn that caught fire first. He concludes that it is impossible to determine unequivocally what caused the fire.

Nevertheless, the Selbstschutz command deliberately exploited the fire and Fritz's death to start mass executions of Poles. This can likely be explained by the fact that in the period preceding the outbreak of war and in its early days, there were no anti-German incidents comparable to the Bloody Sunday in Bydgoszcz or the "death march to Łowicz" that would justify the reckoning with the "Polish leadership class." (Note: This does not mean that relations between local Poles and Germans were entirely harmonious. Among other things, in 1931, a plaque dedicated to German soldiers who fought in World War I was removed in Piastoszyn. In retaliation, local Germans beat up two members of the Association of Insurgents and Veterans. On 3 May 1939, in the same village, several Poles took a portrait of Adolf Hitler from one of the German houses and then demonstratively burned it. There were also tensions over restrictions on the teaching of German (Jastrzębski et al. (2014, p. 185)). In turn, in the first days of September 1939, the Polish Armed Forces retreating from Tuchola was supposed to have retaliated for alleged sabotage by destroying some property belonging to the German minority (Jastrzębski & Szwankowski (2010, pp. 454–455)).) In this situation, the fire at Fritz's farm was considered a convenient pretext.

Even before the mass executions began, one of the local Germans asked Fritz's widow to intercede on behalf of the arrested Poles. The woman reportedly replied that she realized they were innocent, but that they had to be shot because accepting the version that the fire had been started by her intoxicated husband would discredit the family.

== Executions in Rudzki Most ==
=== First execution ===
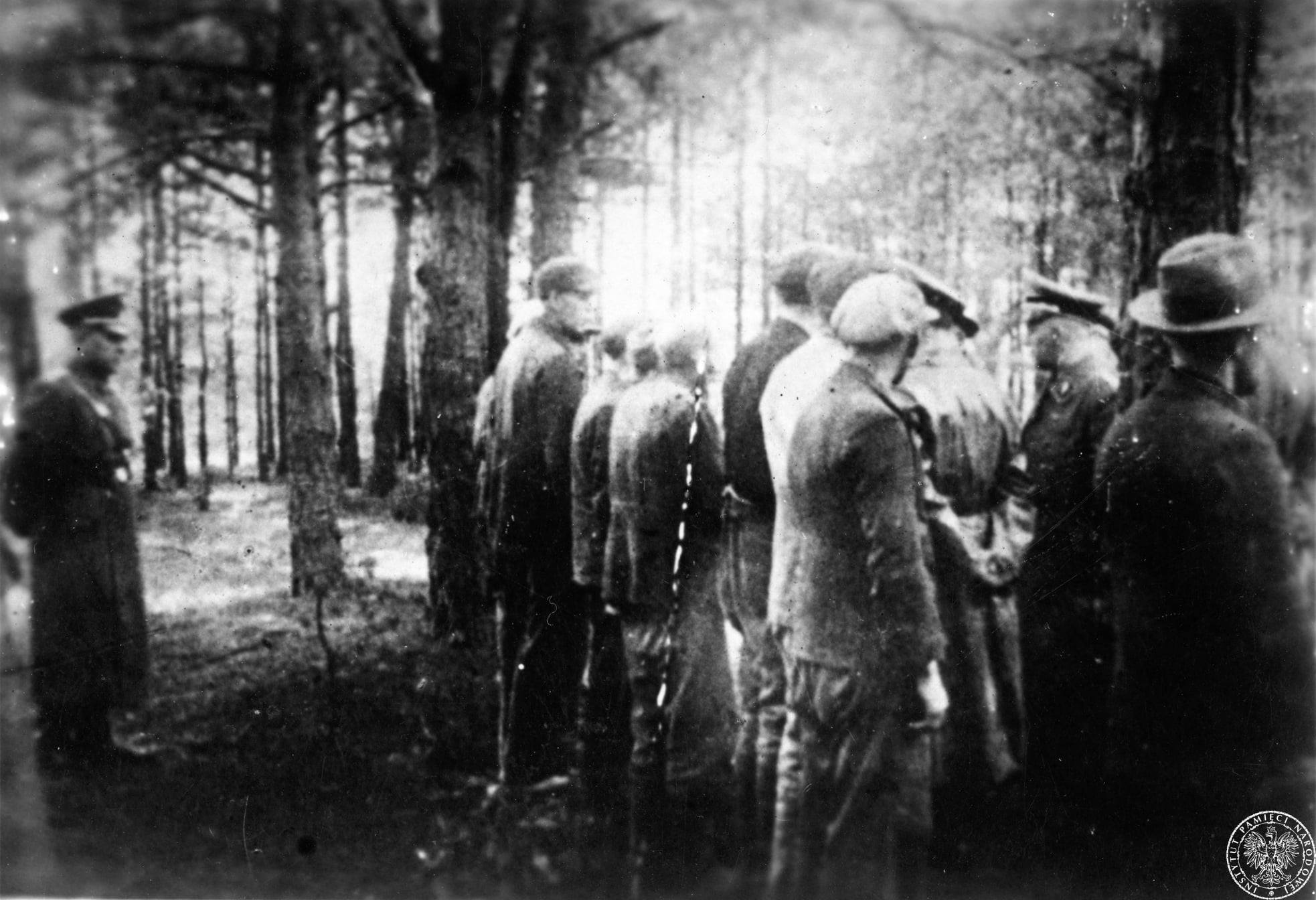
Preparations for one of the executions in Rudzki Most

For the site of the mass executions, the Germans chose the wilderness in Rudzki Most (German: Rudabrücke), located south of Tuchola, on the edge of the Tuchola Forest, between the Brda and Ruda rivers, near the wilderness hut of the same name.

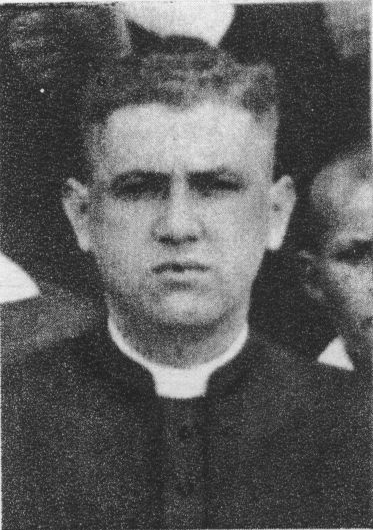
Father Franciszek Nogalski, vicar of the parish in Raciąż. In an attempt to save other convicts, he voluntarily took the blame for setting fire to Hugo Fritz's farm

The first mass execution took place there on 24 October 1939. That day, at around 1:00 PM, several dozen convicts were led out of their cells in the Tuchola prison and, accompanied by blows and kicks, forced to board two trucks. They were then taken to Rudzki Most, where about 30 members of the Selbstschutz were waiting. Among them was Ernst Gehrt, the trustee of the estate in Nowe Żalno. (Note: It was not, as some sources mistakenly claim, Kurt Gehrt from Bagienica (Skibiński (2016, p. 203)).) The convicts were first addressed by a uniformed German officer, most likely SS-Standartenführer Wilhelm Richardt. Gehrt, who spoke Polish, then took the floor. He accused the Poles of setting fire to Hugo Fritz's farmstead, thus causing the death of "the best German in the area." He then declared that if the culprit was found, the other convicts would be released. Father Franciszek Nogalski, the vicar of the Roman Catholic parish in Raciąż, then stepped forward from the ranks and declared that he had set fire to Fritz's farm. (Note: Mazanowska & Ceran (2021, p. 68) state that it was Gehrt who first asked the priest to break the seal of confession and identify the arsonist.) Gehrt, clearly upset and confused, reportedly shouted: "You damned dog, you didn't do it, you just want to protect people." He then said to his companions: "This damned priest is looking for excuses and wants everyone to be released. We must hang him for that." However, there was no suitable tree near the place of execution, so the priest was placed in front of the firing squad and shot first.

Before the actual execution began, a man who spoke to Gehrt while standing in line was also shot. Then, members of the Selbstschutz proceeded to murder the remaining prisoners. First, all valuable items were taken from the victims and they were ordered to throw away their documents. They were shot in groups of six. The firing squad consisted of six Selbstschutz members armed with rifles, commanded by an SS officer. The bodies were thrown into a grave measuring 10 × 1.8 metres. The executioners divided the victims' belongings among themselves. The same happened during subsequent executions.

Based on eyewitness testimony, Edward Skibiński concluded that around 40 Poles were shot in Rudzki Most on that day. Other authors estimated the number of victims at around 60. Wacław Kozłowski also states that among those murdered were 24 residents of Żalno, seven people from Raciąż, five from Tuchola, four each from Piastoszyn and Stobno, three from Grochowo, and one from Dąbrówka. Those shot included the parsons of Raciąż and Dąbrówka, Father Józef Czapiewski and Father Konrad Piątkowski, the headmaster of the school in Tuchola, Józef Ossowski, officials from Tuchola, Józef Chirchowski and Teodor Grzenia, and Jan Lewandowski – the owner of a printing house in Tuchola and publisher of the magazine Głos Tucholski.

In accordance with von Alvensleben's order, 10 people were spared. The would-be convicts had to remove the shoes from the dead victims, place the bodies in a mass grave, and then fill it in. Most of these 10 people survived thanks to the efforts of their friends – Germans who served in the Selbstschutz and were present at the execution site that day. Ernst Gehrt decided to spare both Deutschman sisters (however, their brother, Franciszek, was killed in the execution). (Note: Some sources state that the Deutschman sisters were shot in Rudzki Most. In fact, witness testimony shows that on 24 October, they were among a group of ten Poles who were spared and taken away from the execution site. Later, both were employed at the post office or in German barracks. However, they soon "disappeared," most likely murdered in the basement of the county Selbstschutz headquarters. The pretext was that they told German soldiers that the fire on the Fritz farm had been started by the intoxicated farmer. However, this seems unlikely, as the sisters did not know German (Skibiński (2016, p. 204)).) The Germans wrote down the names of all 10, then took the would-be convicts back to the prison in Tuchola, from where they were released for two days with orders to find the perpetrators of the alleged arson. At the same time, they were threatened that if they did not return to prison within the specified time, their families would be shot as punishment.

=== Second execution ===
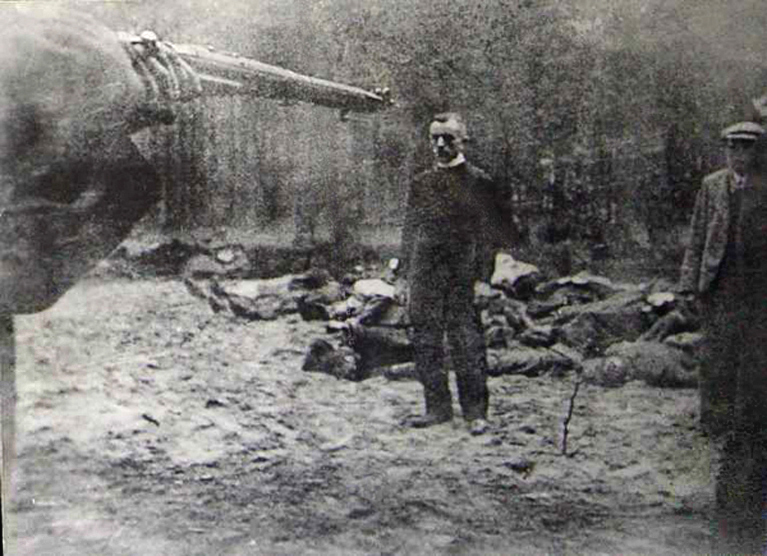
Second execution in Rudzki Most, with Father Piotr Sosnowski standing before the firing squad. For a long time, it was believed that this photograph depicted one of the executions at Piaśnica

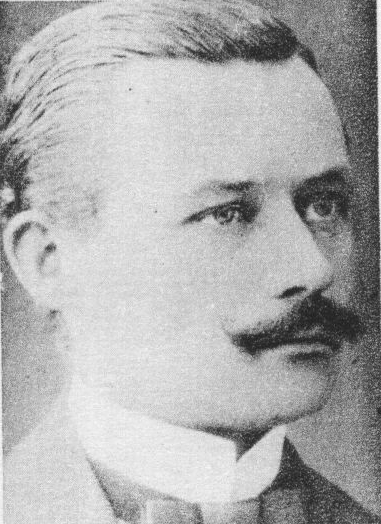
Stanisław Saganowski, mayor of Tuchola, shot in the second execution in Rudzki Most

The second execution took place on 27 October. The victims were brought in two trucks – one came from the prison in Tuchola, and the other from the camp in Radzim. Upon arrival at the execution site, one of the condemned men, Jaszkowski from Bysław, attempted to escape but was shot. As a result, the remaining Poles were ordered to lie face down on the ground. As in the case of the first execution, the victims were shot in groups of six. The execution was supervised by an SS officer with the rank of Standartenführer, and the six-man firing squad consisted of members of the Selbstschutz. Kurt Gehrt and Kurt Wollenberg were responsible for finishing off the wounded.

Edward Skibiński states that 40 Poles were shot on that day. Other authors estimated the number of victims at 65 people. Among them were reportedly 13 residents of Tuchola, three residents of Żalno, two residents of Bysław, and one person each from Klonowo, Lubiewice, Lubiewo, Mała Klonia, Minikowo, Nowa Tuchola, Obrowo, Raciąski Młyn, and Wielkie Budziska. The bodies were buried in a mass grave measuring 14.5 by 2 metres.

Those killed in this execution were mainly representatives of the local intelligentsia, including teachers who had been arrested when they arrived at a supposed "teaching conference." Among those shot were: the mayor of Tuchola, Stanisław Saganowski, the parson of Bysław, Father Piotr Sosnowski, teachers Józef Błażkowski, Antoni Chojnowski, Alfons Gronczewski, Leopold Kowalski, Antoni Królikowski, Antoni Różek, merchants Bernard Lamparski, Stanisław Maćkowski, Stanisław Maron, Jan Świerczyński, and the lawyer Jan Pakuła.

As on the first occasion, 10 convicts were spared. After the execution, they were ordered to fill in the mass grave, and then taken to prison in Tuchola.

=== Third execution ===
The third execution took place on 30 October. At around 1:00 PM, based on a previously prepared list, the convicts began to be called out of their cells in the Tuchola prison. After all their valuables had been taken away, the victims were loaded onto two trucks and taken to Rudzki Most. Upon arrival, they were ordered to lie face down on the ground. Soon, cars with members of the Selbstschutz arrived. They were accompanied by German dignitaries from Tuchola, including Hess and Lange, who were to participate in the execution as observers. When the victims were ordered to stand up, one of the Poles, a farmer from Wielka Klonia named Marczak, attempted to escape. However, he was captured and shot.

A moment later, the remaining convicts were shot. As in previous executions, the victims were murdered in groups of six. This time, however, the firing squad consisted of 12 Selbstschutzmen. The wounded were finished off by Kurt Gehrt and Gestapo officers.

Around 50 Poles were killed in the third execution. Among the victims were five residents of Iwiec, three residents of Bysław, two people each from Lubiewo and Raciąż, and one person each from Gostycyn, Wysoka, and Woziwoda.

Among those murdered were Leonard Ogrzewalski (a teacher from Gostycyn), Konstanty Kamiński (a forestry engineer from Woziwoda), and Ignacy Kowalski (a policeman from Bysław). As in the case of the first execution, 10 convicts were spared and taken back to prison in Tuchola.

=== Fourth execution ===
The fourth execution took place on 2 November. The group of convicts, after having their personal documents and outer clothing taken away, were taken from their cells in the Tuchola prison and loaded onto a truck. Another truck filled with prisoners, likely brought from the camp in Radzim, was waiting outside the building. In front of Polish women who were keeping watch outside the prison where their loved ones were being held, both trucks set off for Rudzki Most. During the journey, the convicts had to kneel with their heads bowed. Upon arrival, they were ordered to lie face down on the ground.

After nearly an hour, following the arrival of the German "commission," the execution began. The victims, divided into groups of six, were shot by members of the Selbstschutz. The execution was led by an SS officer with the rank of Hauptsturmführer. The commander of the camp in Radzim, Werner Sorgatz, also actively participated in the process. Together with Kurt Gehrt, he finished off the wounded. Many of the executioners were under the influence of alcohol. The murdered were buried in a mass grave measuring 8 by 1.8 meters. (Note: Skibiński (2016, p. 206) states that there was more than one grave.)

On that day, between 50 and 70 Poles were murdered in Rudzki Most. Among the identified victims were one resident each from Drożdzienica, Tuchola, Kamienica, Klonia, Krąg, Krzywogoniec, Łyskowo, Nowy Sumin, Piła-Młyn, Przyrowa, Raciąż, Stobno, Śliwice, and Wielki Mędromierz. Those murdered included many teachers: Alojzy Biesek, Cyryl Chylewski, Władysław Kilichowski, Władysław Landrowski, Bolesław Meger, Jan Splettwesen, and Sylwester Szarkowski.

Between three and five Poles were spared and taken back to the prison in Tuchola.

=== Final executions ===
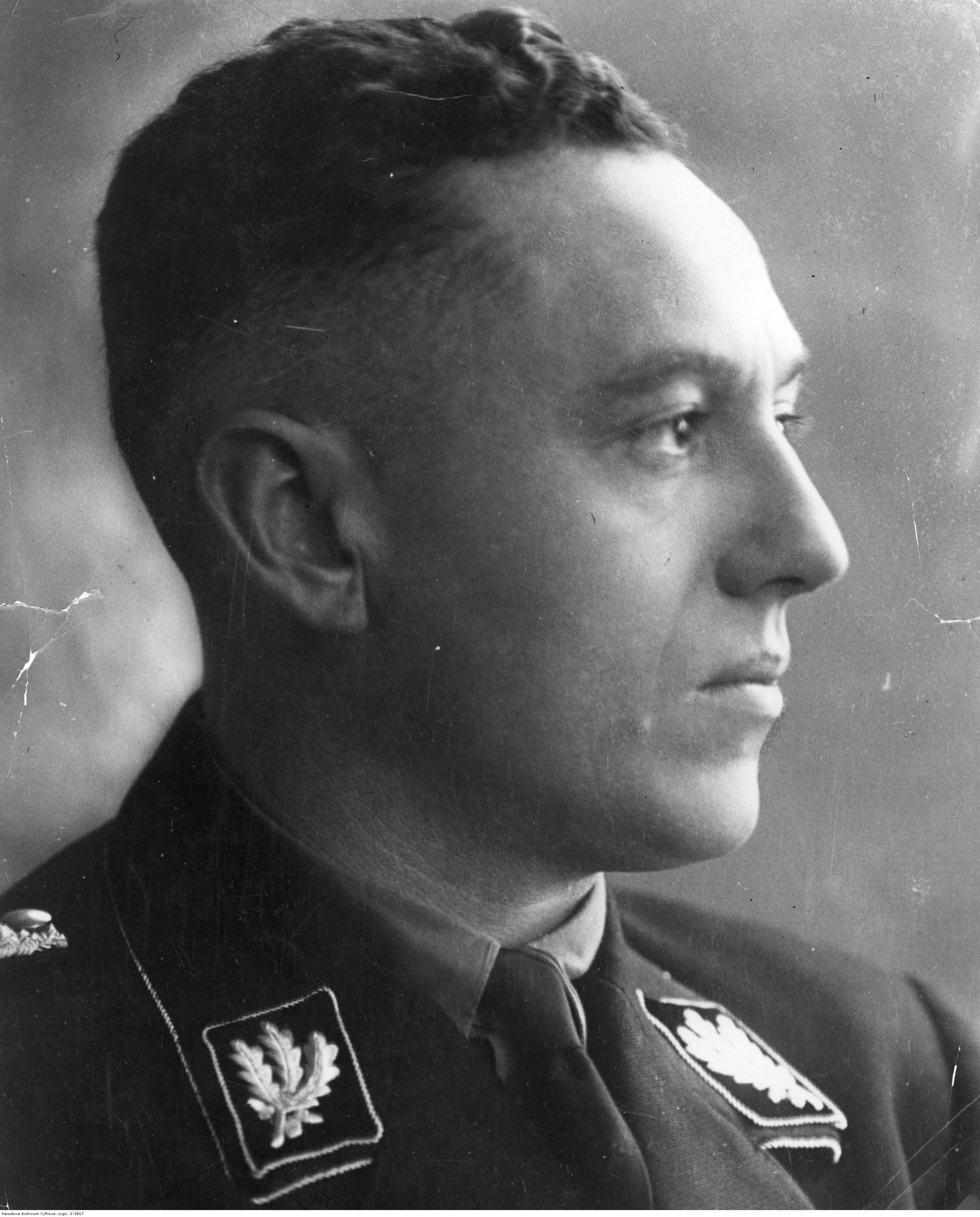
Albert Forster, Gauleiter of the NSDAP and Reichsstatthalter in Reichsgau Danzig-West Prussia. He witnessed the last execution in Rudzki Most

After 2 November, the Poles who were still being held in the cells of the Tuchola prison were told that there would be no more executions. However, news soon spread that the Reich Governor and NSDAP Gauleiter Albert Forster would be visiting the town. The local Selbstschutz decided to "honor" this visit by shooting more Poles.

Some sources state that the fifth execution in Rudzki Most took place on 6 November. However, there is no further information about it.

Witnesses recalled that on the afternoon of 10 November, a few hours before Forster's arrival in Tuchola, three trucks left the prison, two of which were carrying Polish prisoners. One truck headed towards Bladowo, and the others towards Rudzki Most, where the victims were most likely shot.

Forster arrived in Tuchola on the night of 10–11 November. The next day, at around 2:00 PM, (Note: Kozłowski (1987, p. 30) states that these events took place on 10 November.) a meeting of members of the Selbstschutz was held at the Gestapo and Selbstschutz headquarters at 53 Świecka Street. 12 fighters were selected, who, under the command of an SS officer named Fach, went armed to Rudzki Most. Kurt Gehrt had earlier gone to the prison. Based on a previously prepared list, he summoned about 18–19 Poles from their cells, who were taken by truck to Rudzki Most and shot there. The truck made two more trips between the prison and the wilderness, taking further groups of convicts to the place of execution.

According to one Gestapo officer, a "feast of 100 Poles" was prepared for the Gauleiter visiting Tuchola. Wacław Kozłowski states that the last executions (on 6 and 11 November) cost the lives of about 90 people. Włodzimierz Jastrzębski estimates the number of victims of the 11 November executions at 90, but does not mention the 6 November executions. Tomasz Ceran and Izabela Mazanowska, on the other hand, state that 90 people were murdered on 6 November, while the number of victims of the execution on 11 November is described as unknown.

Among the identified victims of the final executions were three residents of Tuchola and one each from Kęsowo and Trzebciny. Those killed on 10–11 November included, among others, Leon Szwaracki, secretary of the forest inspectorate in Trzebciny, and Walerian Gabrych, a public activist and member of the Polish Western Union from Tuchola. The victims were buried in a mass grave measuring 20 × 2 metres.

Albert Forster watched the execution and, after it was over, took part in a reception with the other participants. That evening, he also gave a speech in the brewery hall in Tuchola, during which he declared:

The good God will see to it that within 10 years there will be no Poles left in the Wartheland and the Danzig district. The Poles must disappear from the Danzig district, and they will disappear.

=== Epilogue ===
After 11 November, several prisoners from the Tuchola prison were taken away by the Germans to an unknown destination. The rest were gradually released to their homes between the second half of November 1939 and February 1940.

The camp in Radzim and its sub-camp in Komierowo were liquidated in mid-December 1939. Of the approximately 600 prisoners who were there at the time, a number were transported to a transit camp in the Free City of Danzig, and from there to Stutthof concentration camp. Most were released to their homes, but many were soon re-arrested and transported to various concentration camps.

== Victims ==
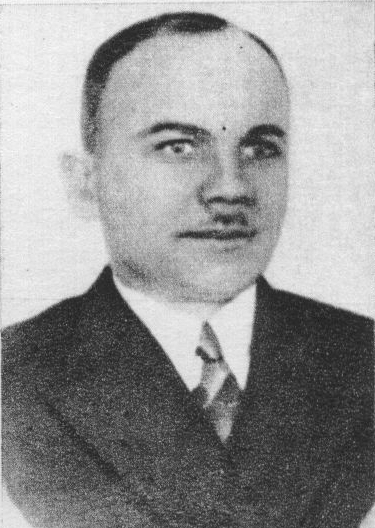
Józef Ossowski, headmaster of the school in Tuchola. One of the victims of the Rudzki Most massacre

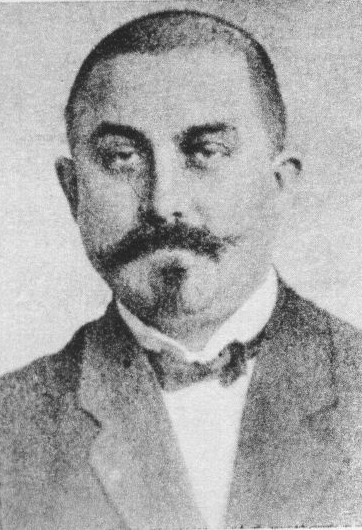
Jan Świerczyński, merchant, member of the Polish Western Union and the Riflemen's Association. Murdered in Rudzki Most

Between 6 and 19 November 1946, employees of the Tuchola Municipal Court conducted exhumation work at the execution site in Rudzki Most. At that time, 237 bodies were recovered from six mass graves (Tomasz Ceran gives the figure of 236).

The graves were located in a difficult-to-access area, and many of the bodies were in a state of complete decomposition. For this reason, some investigators and historians speculated that the number of victims could have been higher. In a 1946 report by the Municipal Court in Tuchola, the number was estimated at 335 people. This number also appears in other sources.

In an earlier survey conducted by the municipal court in 1945, the number of victims was estimated at 315, while in a survey conducted in 1969, it was estimated at a much lower number – 226. According to Barbara Bojarska, the number of people murdered in Rudzki Most reached 250, while Donald Steyer estimated it at 560. The latter figure was also given in guidebooks to commemorated places of struggle and martyrdom published during the Polish People's Republic period.

Among the victims of the Rudzki Most massacre were:

- Local government officials and state employees: Stanisław Saganowski (mayor of Tuchola), Józef Chirchowski (civil servant from Tuchola), Teodor Grzenia (civil servant from Tuchola), Mieczysław Jędrzejewski (ranger from Rykowisko), Konstanty Kamiński (forestry engineer from Woziwoda), Ignacy Kowalski (policeman from Bysław), Michał Nych (ranger from Zamrzenica), Sylwester Patyna (civil servant from Tuchola), Leon Szwaracki (secretary of the forest inspectorate in Trzebciny), Józef Wilgocki (head forester in Sarnia Góra), Zbigniew Żychliński (ranger from Wierzchosławice);
- Teachers: Alojzy Biesek (teacher from Krąg), Józef Błażkowski (teacher from Wielkie Budziska), Antoni Chojnowski (teacher from Obrowo), Cyryl Chylewski (teacher from Wielki Mędromierz), Leonard Chwaściński (teacher from Okoniny), Adam Górecki (teacher from Klonowo), Alfons Gronczewski (teacher from Tuchola), Władysław Kilichowski (teacher from Nowy Sumin), Feliks Kłosowski (head teacher of the school in Kęsowo), Leopold Kowalski (teacher from Lubiewo), Antoni Królikowski (teacher from Mała Klonia), Władysław Landrowski (teacher from Śliwice, collaborator of the Baltic Institute), Bolesław Meger (teacher from Raciąż), Leonard Ogrzewalski (teacher from Gostycyn), Józef Ossowski (headmaster of the school in Tuchola), Hubert Przybyła (teacher from Małe Gacno), Antoni Różek (teacher from Minikowo), Jan Splettwesen (teacher from Przyrowa), Sylwester Szarkowski (teacher from Krzywogoniec), Stanisław Szymański (teacher from Lińsk);
- Roman Catholic clergy: Father Józef Czapiewski (parish priest of the parish in Raciąż), Father Franciszek Nogalski (vicar of the parish in Raciąż), Father Konrad Piątkowski (parish priest of the parish in Dąbrówka), Father Piotr Sosnowski (parish priest of the parish in Bysław);
- Merchants and entrepreneurs: Henryk Kwiatkowski (restaurateur from Stobno), Bernard Lamparski, Franciszek Lamparski, Jan Lewandowski (owner of a printing house in Tuchola, publisher of the newspaper Głos Tucholski), Stanisław Maćkowski (president of the Association of Independent Merchants in Tuchola), Stanisław Maron, Wojciech Pryll, Bernard Rydzkowski, Jan Świerczyński (merchant from Tuchola, member of the Polish Western Union and the Riflemen's Association);
- Students and pupils: Kazimierz Gabrych, Edmund Lamparski, Zdzisław Maćkowski (law student at Adam Mickiewicz University in Poznań, son of Stanisław), Tadeusz Lesiński;
- Lawyers: Jan Pakuła (attorney).

Many farmers, laborers, and craftsmen were also murdered.

== Commemoration ==
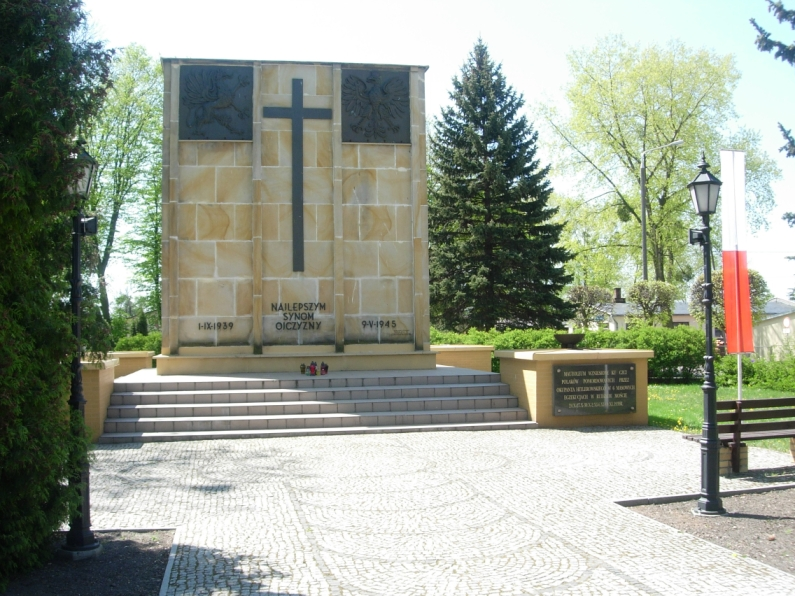
Grave-mausoleum of the victims of the Rudzki Most massacre at the corner of Świecka and Chopin streets in Tuchola

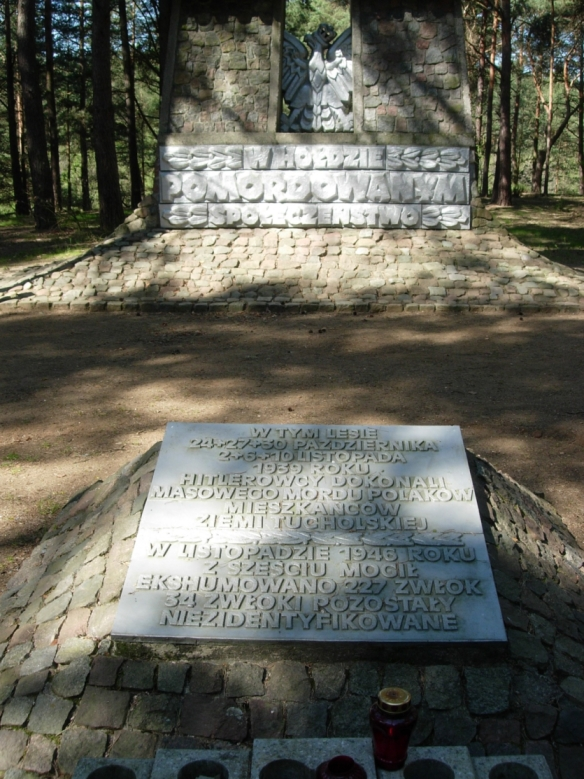
Monument at the execution site in Rudzki Most. In the foreground, the central plaque

On 19 November 1946, coffins containing the remains of 237 people exhumed in Rudzki Most were moved from the execution site to Freedom Square in Tuchola. The next day, they were solemnly buried in a mausoleum at the intersection of Świecka and Chopin streets. Several thousand residents of Tuchola attended the funeral ceremony.

The construction of the monument at the mausoleum began in 1946, but in its current form, designed by Teodor Kuźmowicz, it was completed in the first half of the 1950s. The central part of the monument features a cross, the coat of arms of Poland, the coat of arms of Pomerania, and the inscription:

1 IX 1939 – 9 V 1945
To The Finest Sons of The Fatherland

At the base of the monument there is also a plaque with the inscription:

A mausoleum erected in honor of Poles murdered by the Nazi occupiers in 6 mass executions in Rudzki Most on 24.X. – 27.X. – 30.X. – 2.XI. – 6.XI. – 10.XI.1939

Initially, no monument was erected at the site of the executions, with only a cross and a border around the graves being placed there. The situation changed only in the spring of 1981, during the Solidarity period. On the initiative of Tadeusz Zakryś, a resident of Tuchola, the Social Committee for the Construction of a Monument to the Murdered Poles in Tuchola was formed, which set itself the goal of commemorating the site of the crime. The monument, designed by Stanisław Lejkowski and Grażyna Litwinionek, was unveiled in Rudzki Most on 7 September 1986.

The monument is located approximately 300 meters west of the road from Tuchola Świecie. Its main structure bears the following inscription:

In honor of the murdered – from the people

Next to it are plaques with the names of the identified victims. In front of the main element of the monument, there is a central plaque with the inscription:

In this forest on 24, 27, 30 October and 2, 6 and 10 November 1939, the Nazis committed mass murder of Poles, residents of the Tuchola Land. In November 1946, 227 bodies were exhumed from 6 mass graves, of which 9 were unidentified.

In addition, on the road from Tuchola to Rudzki Most, there is a boulder erected on the initiative of the local branch of the Society of Fighters for Freedom and Democracy, bearing the inscription:

To the victims of fascism 1939–1945

On 17 September 2003, the beatification process of a group of 122 Polish victims of Nazism began in the Diocese of Pelplin. Among them were two priests murdered in Rudzki Most: Franciszek Nogalski and Piotr Sosnowski.

== Perpetrators' accountability ==
Albert Forster, NSDAP Gauleiter and Reichsstatthalter in Reichsgau Danzig-West Prussia, was sentenced to death in April 1948 by the Supreme National Tribunal. The sentence was carried out on 28 February 1952 in the Mokotów prison in Warsaw.

The commander of Selbstschutz Westpreussen, Ludolf von Alvensleben, fled to Argentina after the war, where he died in April 1970.

On 1 February 1965, the trial of four people who belonged to the Selbstschutz structures in the Sępólno and Tuchola counties in the autumn of 1939 began before the regional court in Mannheim. They were:

- Heinrich Mocek – head of the 4th Selbstschutz Inspectorate in Chojnice
- Wilhelm Richardt – county Selbstschutz commander for Sępólno and Tuchola counties
- Werner Sorgatz – commander of the internment camp in Radzim
- Kurt Wollenberg – Selbstschutz member from Tuchola

The proceedings concerned only two of the executions in Rudzki Most. 74 witnesses testified at the trial, including five Poles. Among the latter were three men who survived the executions: Jan Pański, Alfons Urbanowski, and Konstantyn Szwaracki. The German witnesses included several people who, in the autumn of 1939, had been part of the German occupation apparatus in the Tuchola County and had even participated in the executions in Rudzki Most, including Ernst Gehrt, Kurt Gehrt, Bruno Marten, Willi Loer, and Otto Hess.

Ultimately, in a ruling dated 12 April 1965, Mocek and Richardt were sentenced to life imprisonment. However, the latter spent less than five months in prison before being released due to his advanced age and poor health. Sorgatz was sentenced to four years in prison, while Wollenberg was acquitted because the court found that he had participated in the executions under duress.

== Bibliography ==
- Bojarska, Barbara (1972). Eksterminacja inteligencji polskiej na Pomorzu Gdańskim (wrzesień-grudzień 1939) [Extermination of the Polish Intelligentsia in Gdańsk Pomerania (September–December 1939)] (in Polish). Poznań: Instytut Zachodni.
- Bojarska, Barbara (1965). "Obozy zniszczenia na terenie powiatu sępoleńskiego w pierwszych miesiącach okupacji hitlerowskiej" [Extermination Camps in Sępólno County in the First Months of the Nazi Occupation]. Przegląd Zachodni (in Polish). 1–2.
- Ciechanowski, Konrad (1988). Stutthof: hitlerowski obóz koncentracyjny [Stutthof: The Nazi Concentration Camp] (in Polish). Warsaw: Interpress. ISBN 83-223-2369-7.
- Jastrzębski, Włodzimierz; Sikora, Jerzy; Szwankowski, Jerzy; Trzciński, Łukasz (2014). Dzieje Raciąża i miejscowości sołeckich [History of Raciąż and Its Villages] (in Polish). Raciąż: Stowarzyszenie Rozwoju Sołectwa Raciąż. ISBN 9788394031008.
- Jastrzębski, Włodzimierz (1974). Terror i zbrodnia. Eksterminacja ludności polskiej i żydowskiej w rejencji bydgoskiej w latach 1939–1945 [Terror and Crime: Extermination of the Polish and Jewish Population in the Bydgoszcz District, 1939–1945] (in Polish). Warsaw: Interpress.
- Jastrzębski, Włodzimierz; Szwankowski, Jerzy, eds. (2010). Tuchola. Od pradziejów do współczesności [Tuchola: From Prehistoric Times to the Present] (in Polish). Bydgoszcz, Tuchola: LOGO. ISBN 978-83-62097-15-9.
- Kozłowski, Wacław (1987). Stulecie powiatu tucholskiego: 1875–1975 [A Century of Tuchola County: 1875–1975] (in Polish). Vol. II. Bydgoszcz: Kuyavian–Pomeranian Cultural Society.
- Mazanowska, Izabela; Ceran, Tomasz (2021). "Selbstschutz na Pomorzu Gdańskim i Kujawach (Selbstschutz Westpreussen)" [The Selbstschutz in Gdańsk Pomerania and Kuyavia (Selbstschutz Westpreussen)]. In Mazanowska, Izabela; Ceran, Tomasz; Przegiętka, Marcin (eds.). W cieniu Einsatzgruppen. Volksdeutscher Selbstschutz w okupowanej Polsce 1939–1940. Wybrane zagadnienia [In the Shadow of the Einsatzgruppen: The Volksdeutscher Selbstschutz in Occupied Poland 1939–1940: Selected Issues] (in Polish). Warsaw: Institute of National Remembrance. ISBN 978-83-8229-261-9.
- Mazurowski, Wiesław (2007). "Życie i śmierć męczenników przykładem wierności Bogu" [The Life and Death of Martyrs as an Example of Fidelity to God]. Verbum Vitae (in Polish). 11. Biblical Studies Section of the Catholic University of Lublin. doi:10.31743/vv.1423. ISSN 2451-280X.
- Schenk, Dieter (2002). Albert Forster. Gdański namiestnik Hitlera [Albert Forster: Hitler's Danzig Governor] (in Polish). Gdańsk: Oskar. ISBN 83-86181-83-4.
- Skibiński, Edward (2016). "Zbrodnia w Rudzkim Moście w październiku i listopadzie 1939 roku" [The Massacre in Rudzki Most in October and November 1939]. In Ceran, Tomasz; Mazanowska, Izabela (eds.). Zapomniani kaci Hitlera. Volksdeutscher Selbstschutz w okupowanej Polsce 1939–1940. Wybrane zagadnienia [Hitler's Forgotten Executioners: The Volksdeutscher Selbstschutz in Occupied Poland 1939–1940: Selected Issues] (in Polish). Bydgoszcz, Gdańsk: Institute of National Remembrance. ISBN 978-83-7629-952-5.
- Wardzyńska, Maria (2009). Był rok 1939. Operacja niemieckiej policji bezpieczeństwa w Polsce. Intelligenzaktion [It Was the Year 1939: The Operation of the German Security Police in Poland: Intelligenzaktion] (in Polish). Warsaw: Institute of National Remembrance. ISBN 978-83-7629-063-8.
