= Franciszek Nogalski =

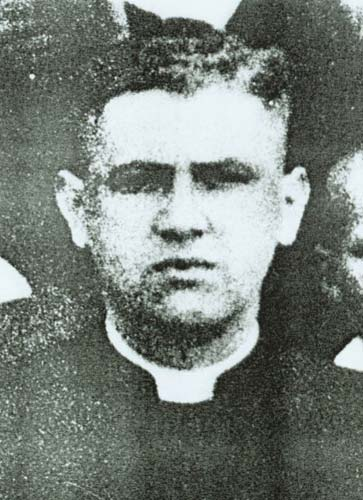
Franciszek Nogalski

Franciszek Nogalski (16 January 1911 – 24 October 1939) was a Polish Roman Catholic priest and parochial vicar in Raciąż. He was executed by Nazi German occupants during the Rudzki Most massacre. Before his death Nogalski unsuccessfully tried to save other hostages by sacrificing himself. He has been accorded the title of Servant of God and he is one of the 122 Polish martyrs of the Second World War whose beatification process started in 2003.

== Early life ==
He was born in 1911 in Wąbrzeźno (then German Empire, present day Poland). He was a son of Franciszek Nogalski, a stonemason, and Wiktoria née Lwandowska. He attended Wąbrzeźno high school where he passed the Baccalaureate Exam (1932). Then he entered Pelplin Higher Priest Seminary where he study philosophy and theology. He was ordained on 11 June 1938. After the ordination he take up ministry as the parochial vicar in Raciąż village near Tuchola.

== Death ==
After the Nazi invasion of Poland Nogalski was arrested and imprisoned. His detention was an element of the Intelligenzaktion in Pomerania (Intelligence Action Pomerania), a part of an overall Intelligenzaktion by Nazi Germany aimed at liquidating the Polish elite – especially Roman Catholic clergy and intelligentsia.

In Tuchola County German authorities tried to find a convenient pretext to execute the arrested members of the Polish intelligentsia. On the night of 21 October 1939 a barn which belonged to Hugo Fritz – a local ethnic German – was burned to the ground in Piastoszyn village. In the same night shocked Fritz died of a heart attack. It was commonly known that drunken Fritz left a lit cigar in the building. However Nazi authorities accused the local Poles of setting fire to the barn and the "murder" of Fritz.

On 24 October 1939 the first group of 45 hostages – among them Nogalski – was taken to the place of execution in the forest near Rudzki Most. The massacre was to be carried out by members of the so-called Volksdeutscher Selbstschutz, a paramilitary organization of ethnic Germans who were previously Polish citizens. Before the execution, local Selbstschutz leader, Kurt Gehrt, made a speech to the Polish hostages. He claimed that "Poles murdered Hugo Fritz, the best German man in the area" and then promised that the hostages would be released if the arsonist identified himself. Hearing this, Nogalski stepped forward and said that he was the one who set fire to the barn. Confused and angry, Gehrt said to his comrades: "This bloody priest is looking for an excuse to save the others. We must hang him!". However, they did not find a suitable tree so they violently beat the priest and then shot him.

Nogalski's sacrifice did not stop the massacre. Between 24 October and 10 November 1939 about 335 Poles were executed in Rudzki Most.

== Beatification process ==
Nogalski has been accorded the title of Servant of God. He is currently one of the 122 Polish martyrs of the Second World War who are included in the beatification process initiated in 1994, whose first beatification session was held in Warsaw on 17 September 2003.
