= Siciny =

Siciny may refer to the following places in Poland:

- Siciny, Lower Silesian Voivodeship (south-west Poland)
- Siciny, Kuyavian-Pomeranian Voivodeship (north-central Poland)

== See also ==
- Sicini, a tribe of flies
