= Linsk =

Linsk may refer to:

- Lesko in Subcarpathian Voivodeship
- Lińsk in Kuyavian-Pomeranian Voivodeship
- A synonym for Ropshitz (Hasidic dynasty), a Hasidic dynasty founded by Rabbi Naftali Tzvi Horowitz, son of Rabbi Menachem Mendel of Linsk
- Linsk (Hasidic dynasty), a Hasidic dynasty founded by Rabbi Avraham Chaim Horowitz of Linsk, a branch of the Ropshitz dynasty
