= Raciąż, Kuyavian-Pomeranian Voivodeship =

Raciąż
- Village
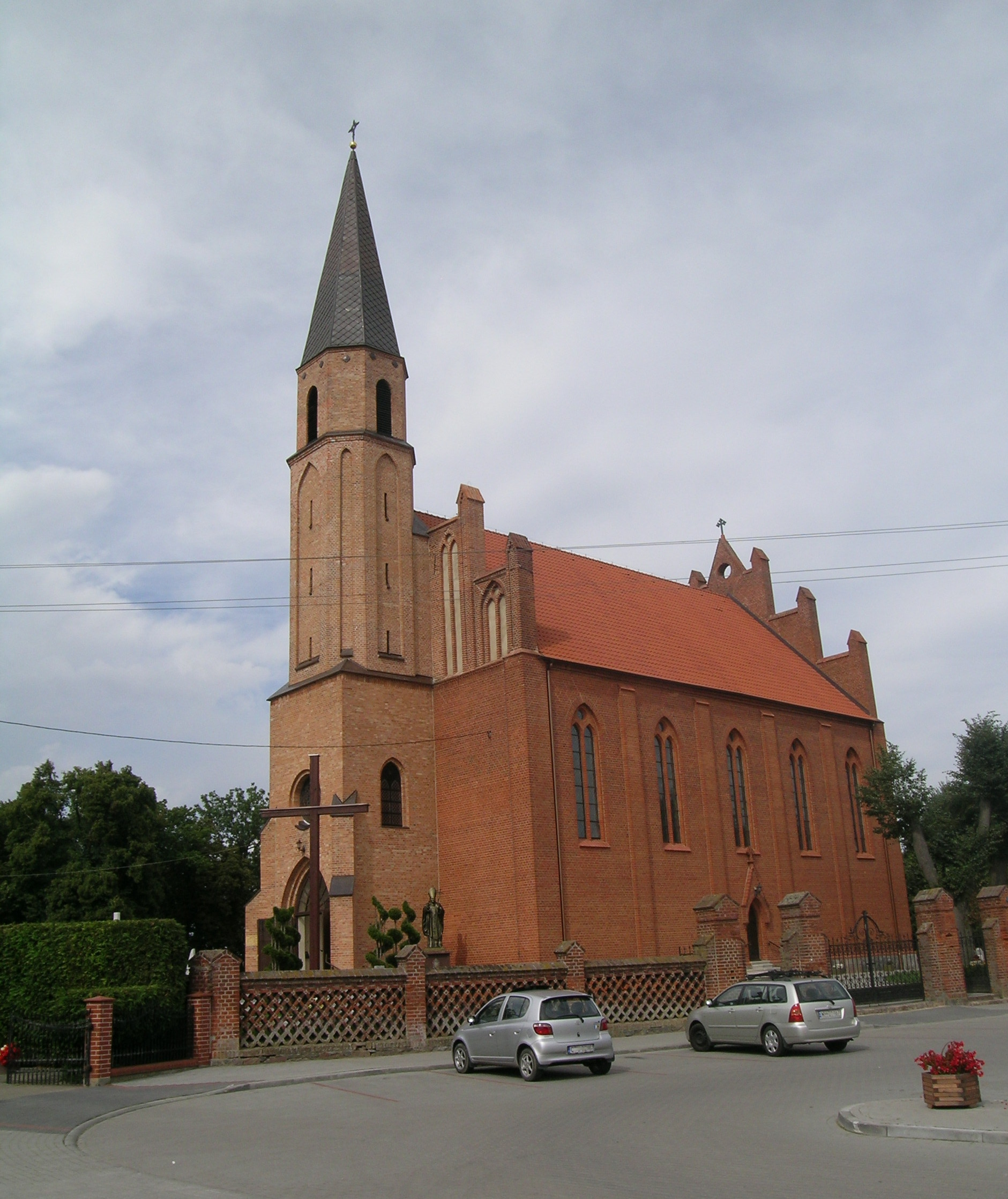
- Holy Trinity church in Raciąż

- Location within Poland
- Coordinates: 53°39′48″N 17°47′6″E
- Country: Poland
- Voivodeship: Kuyavian-Pomeranian
- County: Tuchola
- Gmina: Tuchola
- Population: 756
- Time zone: UTC+1 (CET)
  - Summer (DST): UTC+2 (CEST)
- Vehicle registration: CTU

Raciąż ([ˈrat͡ɕɔ̃ʂ]; German: Reetz) is a village in the administrative district of Gmina Tuchola, within Tuchola County, Kuyavian-Pomeranian Voivodeship, in north-central Poland. It is located in the Tuchola Forest in the historic region of Pomerania.

== History ==
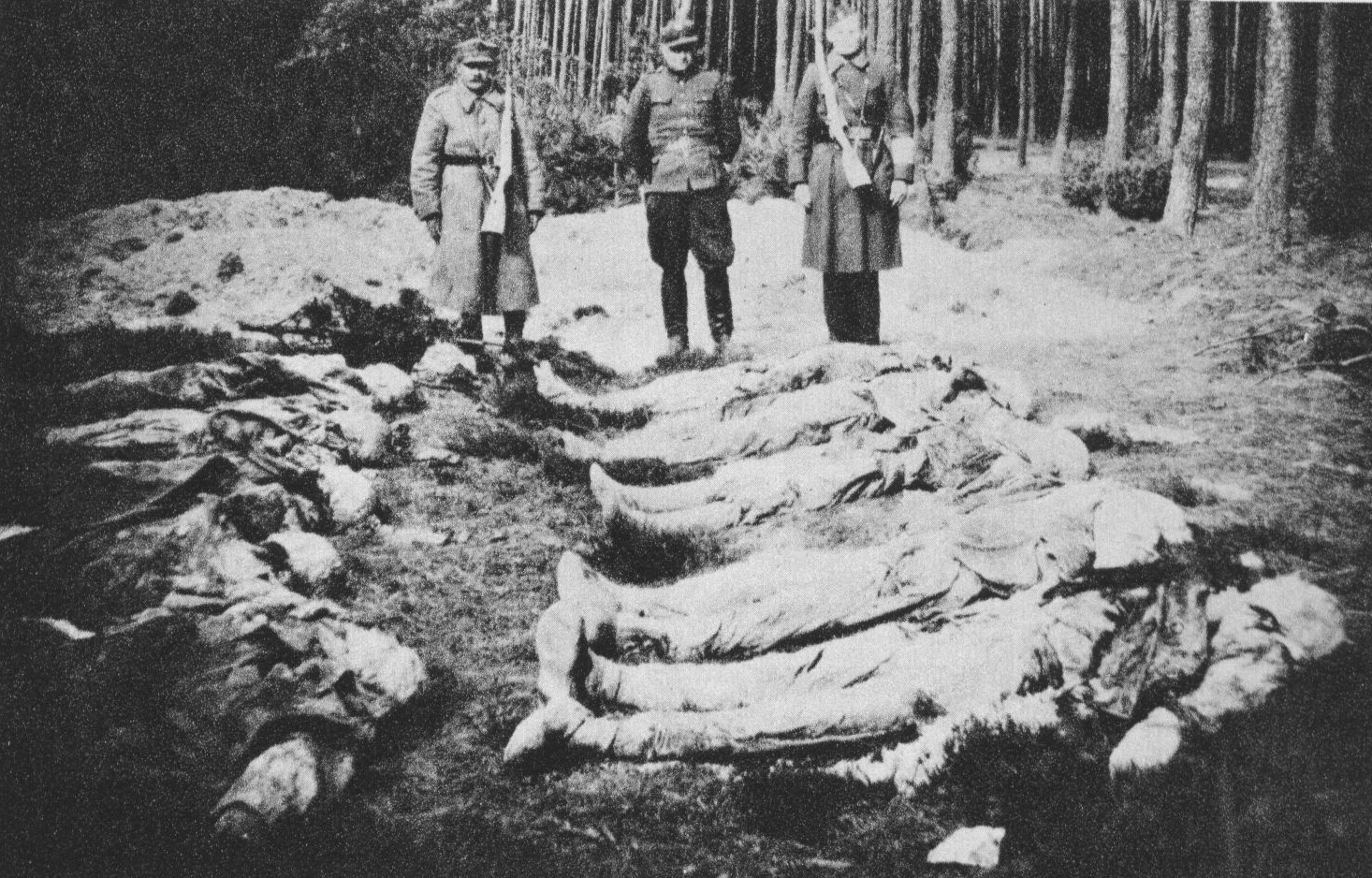
Exhumation of Poles executed by the Germans in Raciąż in 1940

The village was mentioned in medieval documents in 1198, when it was part of the fragmented Kingdom of Poland. A medieval stronghold was located at the site, and it is today an archaeological site. Raciąż was a royal village of the Polish Crown, administratively located in the Tuchola County in the Pomeranian Voivodeship.

During the German occupation of Poland (World War II), several Polish inhabitants of Raciąż, including two Catholic priests were among over 50 Poles murdered by the Germans in Rudzki Most on October 24, 1939 (see also Nazi crimes against the Polish nation). Many Polish farmers from Raciąż were murdered in further massacres in Rudzki Most. In 1940, 1942 and 1943, the occupiers carried out expulsions of Poles, whose houses were then handed over to German colonists as part of the Lebensraum policy. Expelled Poles were often either imprisoned in the Potulice concentration camp, deported to forced labour in Germany or enslaved as forced labour of new German colonists at the site.

== Notable people ==
- Kazimierz Kręcki (1817–1856), Polish priest and activist, co-founder of the Liga Polska organization
- Jan Walenty Kręcki (1823–1894), Polish priest and insurgent of the Greater Poland uprising (1848)
- Franciszek Nogalski (1911–1939), Polish Roman Catholic priest, Servant of God and martyr, parochial vicar in Raciąż in 1938–1939, murdered by the Germans in the Rudzki Most massacre.
