= Jeleńcz, Kuyavian-Pomeranian Voivodeship =

Jeleńcz
- Village
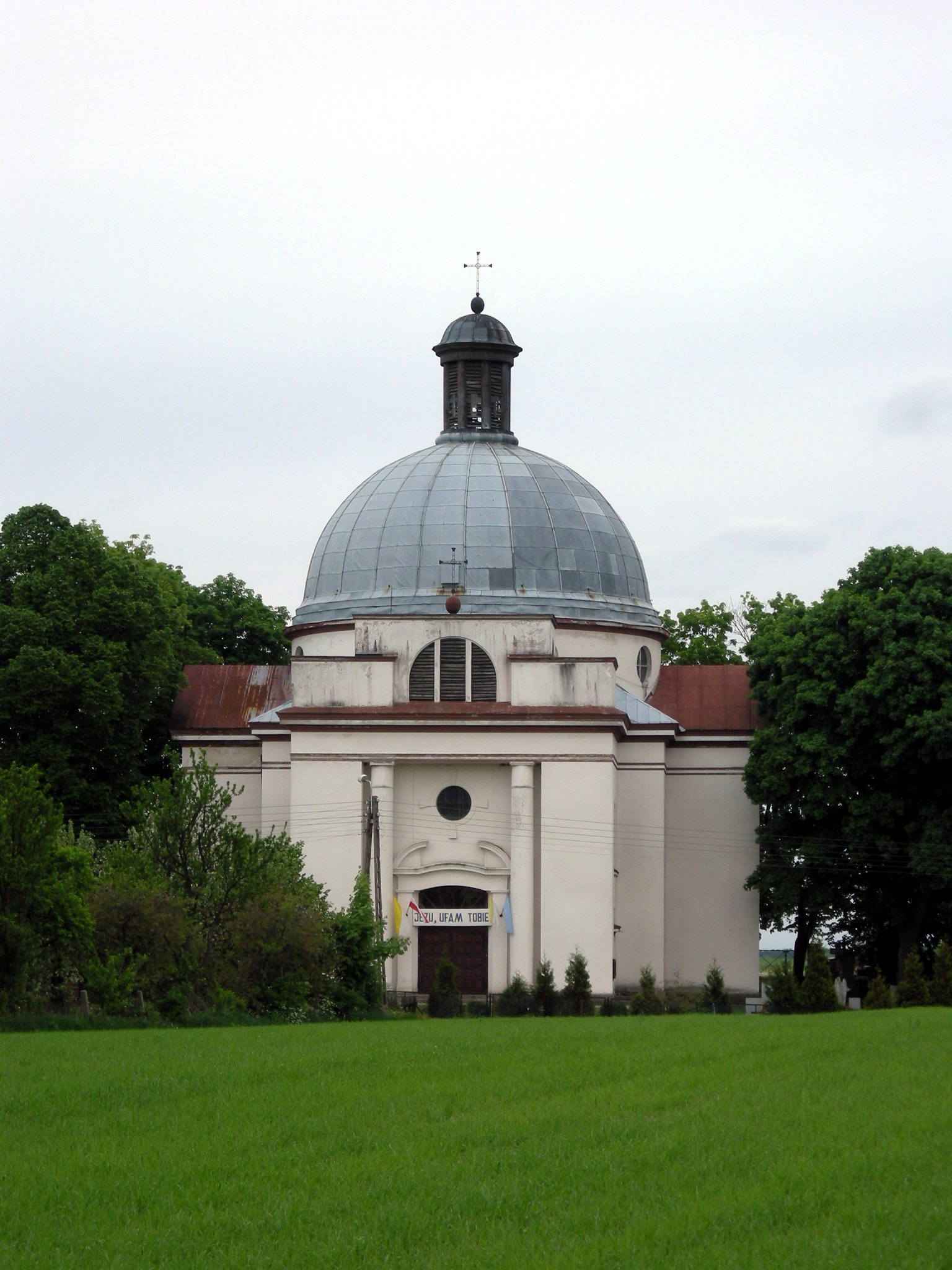
- Christ the King church in Jeleńcz

- Location within Poland
- Coordinates: 53°33′34″N 17°44′43″E
- Country: Poland
- Voivodeship: Kuyavian-Pomeranian
- County: Tuchola
- Gmina: Kęsowo

Population
  - Total: 200
- Time zone: UTC+1 (CET)
  - Summer (DST): UTC+2 (CEST)
- Vehicle registration: CTU

Jeleńcz [ˈjɛlɛɲt͡ʂ] is a village in the administrative district of Gmina Kęsowo, within Tuchola County, Kuyavian-Pomeranian Voivodeship, in north-central Poland. It is located within the historic region of Pomerania.

== History ==
Jeleńcz was a royal village of the Polish Crown, administratively located in the Tuchola County in the Pomeranian Voivodeship.

During the German occupation of Poland (World War II), the Germans murdered the sołtys of Jeleńcz (head of the local administration) in the massacre in Rudzki Most as part of the Intelligenzaktion, and carried out expulsions of local Poles, whose farms were then handed over to German colonists as part of the Lebensraum policy. Some Poles were deported to forced labour to Germany.
