= Przyrowa, Tuchola County =

Przyrowa
- Village
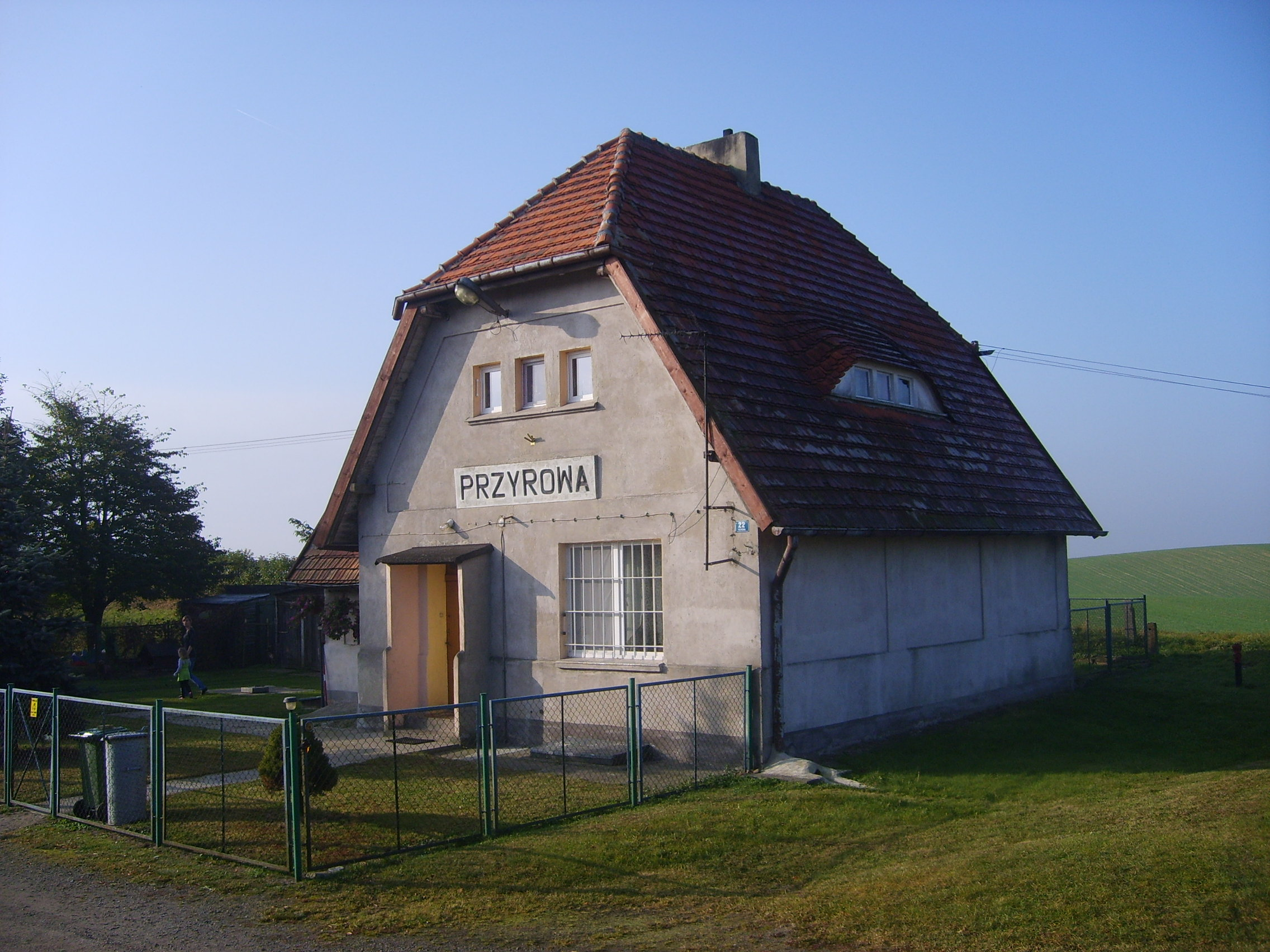

- Location within Poland
- Coordinates: 53°32′N 17°47′E
- Country: Poland
- Voivodeship: Kuyavian-Pomeranian
- County: Tuchola
- Gmina: Gostycyn
- Time zone: UTC+1 (CET)
  - Summer (DST): UTC+2 (CEST)
- Vehicle registration: CWL

Przyrowa [pʂɨˈrɔva] is a village in the administrative district of Gmina Gostycyn, within Tuchola County, Kuyavian-Pomeranian Voivodeship, in north-central Poland.

== History ==
The existence of the village is documented in 1374. Przyrowa was a private village of Polish nobility, including the Przeworski and Węsierski families, administratively located in the Tuchola County in the Pomeranian Voivodeship of the Kingdom of Poland. In 1867, the village had a population of 124.

Following the joint German-Soviet invasion of Poland, which started World War II in September 1939, the village was occupied by Germany until 1945. In 1939, a local Polish teacher was among Poles from the region, who were massacred by the Germans in Rudzki Most during the genocidal Intelligenzaktion campaign. In 1942–1943, the occupiers carried out expulsions of Poles, who were deported to the Potulice concentration camp, while their houses were handed over to new German colonists as part of the Lebensraum policy.
