= Gmina Kęsowo =

Gmina Kęsowo Kęsowo Commune
- Gmina
- Flag Coat of arms
- Interactive map of Gmina Kęsowo
- Coordinates (Kęsowo): 53°33′31″N 17°42′47″E
- Country: Poland
- Voivodeship: Kuyavian-Pomeranian
- County: Tuchola
- Seat: Kęsowo

Area
  - Total: 108.82 km^{2} (42.02 sq mi)

Population (2006)
  - Total: 4,381
  - Density: 40.26/km^{2} (104.3/sq mi)
- Website: http://www.kesowo.las.pl

Gmina Kęsowo is a rural gmina (administrative district) in Tuchola County, Kuyavian-Pomeranian Voivodeship, in north-central Poland. Its seat is the village of Kęsowo, which lies approximately 11 kilometres (7 mi) south-west of Tuchola and 53 km (33 mi) north of Bydgoszcz.

The gmina covers an area of 108.82 square kilometres (42.0 sq mi), and as of 2006 its total population is 4,381.

== Villages ==
Gmina Kęsowo contains the villages and settlements of Adamkowo, Bralewnica, Brzuchowo, Drożdzienica, Grochowo, Jeleńcz, Kęsowo, Krajenki, Ludwichowo, Nowe Żalno, Obrowo, Pamiętowo, Piastoszyn, Przymuszewo, Sicinki, Siciny, Tuchółka, Wieszczyce and Żalno.

== Neighbouring gminas ==
Gmina Kęsowo is bordered by the gminas of Chojnice, Gostycyn, Kamień Krajeński, Sępólno Krajeńskie and Tuchola.
