= Pamiętowo =

- Village
- Location within Poland
- Coordinates: 53°30′48″N 17°40′14″E
- Country: Poland
- Voivodeship: Kuyavian-Pomeranian
- County: Tuchola
- Gmina: Kęsowo
- Population: 230

Pamiętowo [pamjɛnˈtɔvɔ] is a village in the administrative district of Gmina Kęsowo, within Tuchola County, Kuyavian-Pomeranian Voivodeship, in north-central Poland.
