= Brzuchowo =

- Village
- Location within Poland
- Coordinates: 53°32′40″N 17°46′18″E
- Country: Poland
- Voivodeship: Kuyavian-Pomeranian
- County: Tuchola
- Gmina: Kęsowo
- Population: 130

Brzuchowo [bʐuˈxɔvɔ] is a village in the administrative district of Gmina Kęsowo, within Tuchola County, Kuyavian-Pomeranian Voivodeship, in north-central Poland.
