= Bagienica =

- Village
- Location within Poland
- Coordinates: 53°28′N 17°47′E
- Country: Poland
- Voivodeship: Kuyavian-Pomeranian
- County: Tuchola
- Gmina: Gostycyn

Population
  - Total: 310
- Time zone: UTC+1 (CET)
  - Summer (DST): UTC+2 (CEST)
- Vehicle registration: CTU

Bagienica [baɡʲɛˈnit͡sa] is a village in the administrative district of Gmina Gostycyn, within Tuchola County, Kuyavian-Pomeranian Voivodeship, in north-central Poland.

== History ==
Following the joint German-Soviet invasion of Poland, which started World War II in September 1939, the village was occupied by Germany until 1945. In 1939, local farmers were among Poles from the region, who were massacred by the Germans in Rudzki Most during the genocidal Intelligenzaktion campaign. In 1942, the occupiers carried out expulsions of Poles, who were deported to the Potulice concentration camp, while their houses were handed over to new German colonists as part of the Lebensraum policy. In 1943, Poles from other nearby villages were enslaved as forced labour of the German colonists.
