= Obrowo, Tuchola County =

Obrowo
- Village
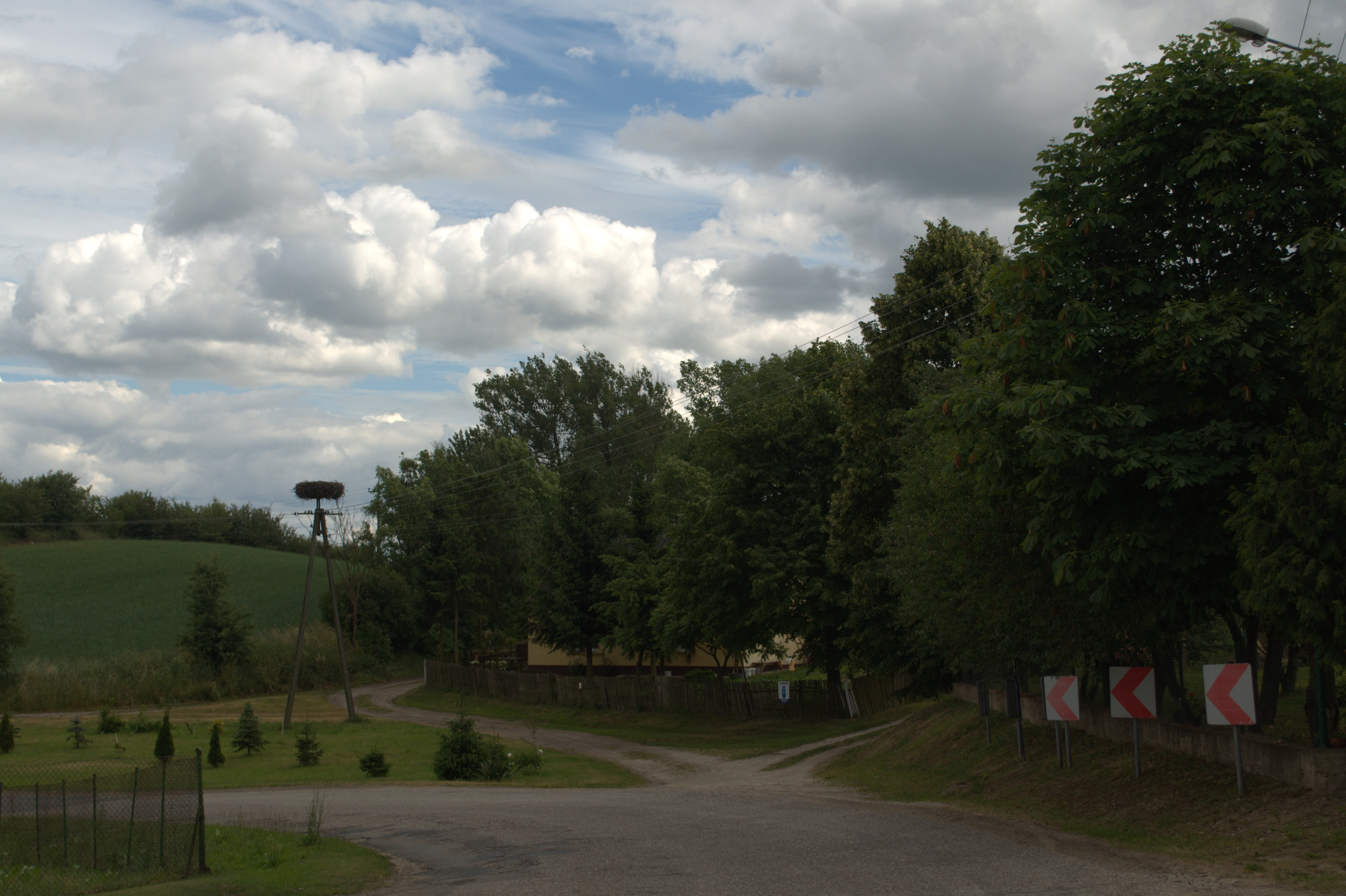

- Location within Poland
- Coordinates: 53°35′11″N 17°40′55″E
- Country: Poland
- Voivodeship: Kuyavian-Pomeranian
- County: Tuchola
- Gmina: Kęsowo

Population
  - Total: 160
- Time zone: UTC+1 (CET)
  - Summer (DST): UTC+2 (CEST)
- Vehicle registration: CTU

Obrowo [ɔˈbrɔvɔ] is a village in the administrative district of Gmina Kęsowo, within Tuchola County, Kuyavian-Pomeranian Voivodeship, in northern Poland.

== Geography ==
Obrowo lies approximately 4 kilometres (2 mi) north-west of Kęsowo, 12 km (7 mi) west of Tuchola, and 57 km (35 mi) north of Bydgoszcz. It is located in the Tuchola Forest in the historic region of Pomerania.

== History ==
Obrowo was administratively located in the Tuchola County in the Pomeranian Voivodeship in the province of Royal Prussia in the Greater Poland Province of the Kingdom of Poland, from 1569 part of the Polish–Lithuanian Commonwealth. In the 16th century, the village was possibly purchased by the nearby town of Chojnice. As of 1727, it was a possession of Sebastian Tuchołka. In 1753, Michał Sapieha granted Obrowo to five men as a hereditary possession, with exemption from taxes, which was confirmed by King Augustus III of Poland in 1754 in Warsaw.

In 1772 in the course of the First Partition of Poland the Kingdom of Prussia seized Obrowo, as ratified by the Partition Sejm in 1773. In 1871 the Kingdom of Prussia merged in the newly formed German Empire. After World War I Obrowo became part of the Second Polish Republic following the Peace of Versailles. During World War II Nazi Germany occupied and annexed Obrowo. This unilateral act was reversed by Germany's defeat in 1945.
