= Stobno, Kuyavian-Pomeranian Voivodeship =

Stobno
- Village
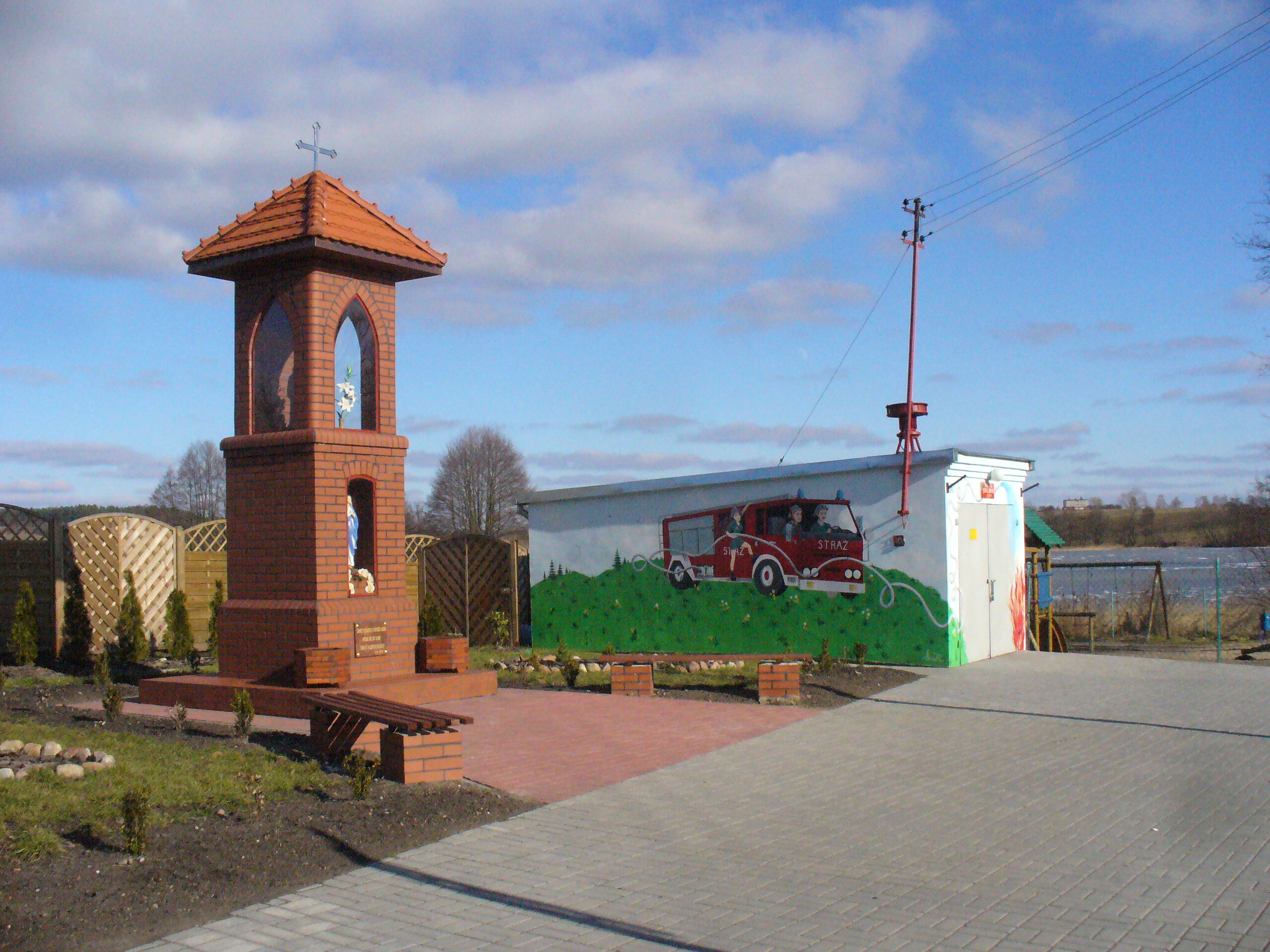
- Wayside shrine in Stobno

- Location within Poland
- Coordinates: 53°38′47″N 17°48′46″E
- Country: Poland
- Voivodeship: Kuyavian-Pomeranian
- County: Tuchola
- Gmina: Tuchola
- Time zone: UTC+1 (CET)
  - Summer (DST): UTC+2 (CEST)
- Vehicle registration: CTU

Stobno ([ˈstɔbnɔ]; German: Stobno, 1942-45 Stübensee) is a village in the administrative district of Gmina Tuchola, within Tuchola County, Kuyavian-Pomeranian Voivodeship, in north-central Poland. It is located to the southwest of Lake Stobno, within the historic region of Pomerania.

== History ==
Stobno was a royal village of the Polish Crown, administratively located in the Tuchola County in the Pomeranian Voivodeship.

During the German occupation of Poland (World War II), the Germans murdered several Polish inhabitants of Stobno during large massacres of Poles carried out in nearby Rudzki Most in 1939. In 1942, the occupiers carried out expulsions of Poles, who then were imprisoned in the Potulice concentration camp, and afterwards some were deported to forced labour in Germany, while their farms were handed over to German colonists as part of the Lebensraum policy.
