= Otton Steinborn =

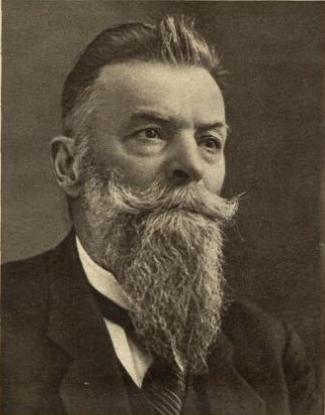

Otton Andrzej Steinborn (26 May 1868, in Nowy Sumin, Bory Tucholskie – 4 July 1936, in Toruń) was a Polish dermatologist and mayor of Toruń. He was awarded the Cross of Merit and Order of Polonia Restituta.

== Early life ==
He came from a German family. Initially he studied theology but moved to medicine. He studied in Würzburg, Berlin, Rostock and Leipzig, where he defended his doctoral thesis. As a 14-year-old he was a member of a secret Polish student associations - Philomath.

== Career ==
After obtaining his doctorate, he came to Toruń, where practiced medicine. He defended the national rights of the Polish population and personally directed the preparations to welcome the Polish Army in Torun. He welcomed the military to the city on 18 January 1920. That same day he was appointed president receivership of Torun. He held this position until 9 February 1920. He was awarded the Silver Cross of Merit and the Officer's Cross of the Order of Polonia Restituta.

Though born in a family of German, Steinborn was a Pole by choice, a Polish patriot and social activist. He took an active part in Polish cultural and scientific life. He actively worked towards regaining Polish independence. He married Helena Kawczyńska, a veteran social activist.

Parallel to his medical practice, he worked in the Toruń Scientific Society (TNT), serving in the interwar period, reaching Vice President. In 1923, he initiated the creation of the City Library. Nicolaus Copernicus University emerged in Toruń. According to his idea Książnica City became a research library. merged collections of the Toruń Scientific Society, Coppernicus-Verein für Wissenschaft und Kunst, Academic Gymnasium and the City Council of Toruń.

When in November 1918, after losing the war, Toruń became part of Poland. Steinborn served on the local People's Council, from its inception. At the end of 1919, he became president.

Otto Steinborn gave a speech on January 18, 1920, to welcome Polish troops under the command of Col. Stanislaw Skrzyński, as they entered Toruń. On the same day Steinborn became the town's first Polish mayor. He held this position until February 9, 1920. In the years 1922-1930 he held the title of Senator Steinborn. In December 1920, Steinborn participated in the creation of the Confraternity of Artists, as one of its 12 co-founders.
