= Tuchółka =

- Village
- Location within Poland
- Coordinates: 53°34′25″N 17°44′54″E
- Country: Poland
- Voivodeship: Kuyavian-Pomeranian
- County: Tuchola
- Gmina: Kęsowo
- Population: 248

Tuchółka [tuˈxuu̯ka] is a village in the administrative district of Gmina Kęsowo, within Tuchola County, Kuyavian-Pomeranian Voivodeship, in north-central Poland.
