= Wieszczyce, Kuyavian-Pomeranian Voivodeship =

Wieszczyce
- Village
- Location within Poland
- Coordinates: 53°32′22″N 17°44′34″E
- Country: Poland
- Voivodeship: Kuyavian-Pomeranian
- County: Tuchola
- Gmina: Kęsowo
- Population: 320

Wieszczyce [vjɛʂˈt͡ʂɨt͡sɛ] is a village in the administrative district of Gmina Kęsowo, within Tuchola County, Kuyavian-Pomeranian Voivodeship, in north-central Poland.
