= Bralewnica =

- Village
- Location within Poland
- Coordinates: 53°31′0″N 17°44′57″E
- Country: Poland
- Voivodeship: Kuyavian-Pomeranian
- County: Tuchola
- Gmina: Kęsowo
- Population: 70
- Time zone: UTC+1 (CET)
  - Summer (DST): UTC+2 (CEST)
- Vehicle registration: CTU

Bralewnica [bralɛvˈnit͡sa] is a village in the administrative district of Gmina Kęsowo, within Tuchola County, Kuyavian-Pomeranian Voivodeship, in north-central Poland. It is located within the historic region of Pomerania.

== History ==
Bralewnica was mentioned in medieval documents in 1300, 1369 and 1385. It was a royal village of the Polish Crown, administratively located in the Tuchola County in the Pomeranian Voivodeship.

During the German occupation of Poland (World War II), the Germans murdered several Polish inhabitants of Bralewnica on 3 November 1940, and then on November 5 they expelled the families of the victims, while their farms were handed over to Germans as part of the Lebensraum policy.
