= Żalno =

- Village
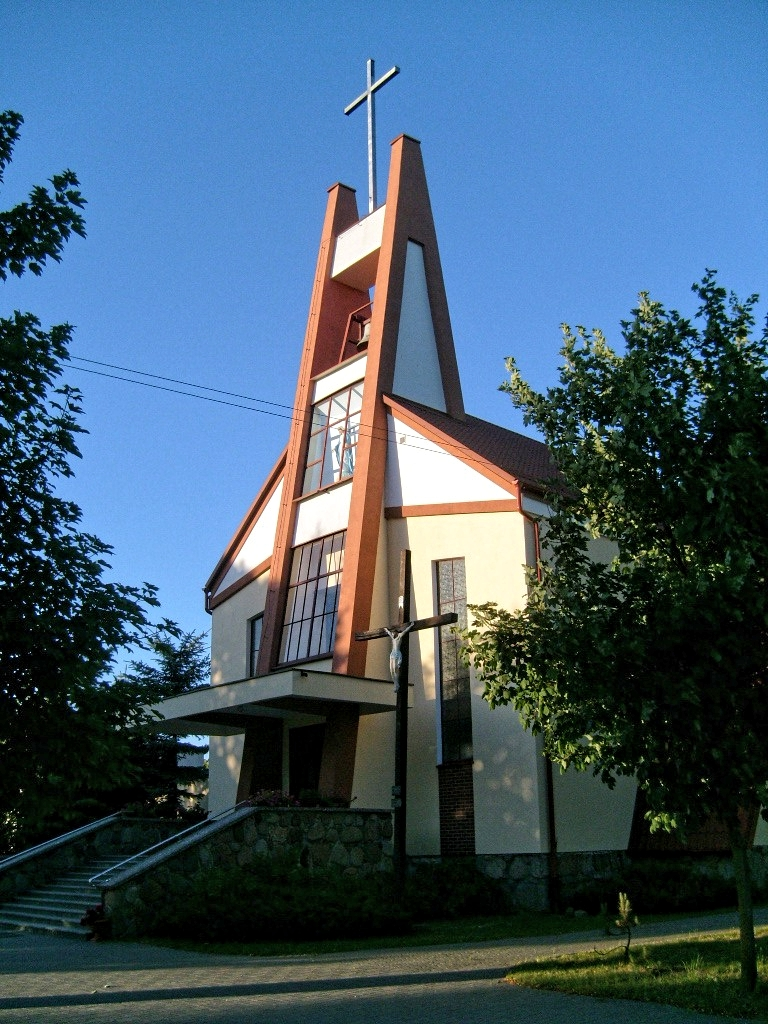
- Our Lady of Perpetual Help church in Żalno

- Location within Poland
- Coordinates: 53°36′N 17°46′E
- Country: Poland
- Voivodeship: Kuyavian-Pomeranian
- County: Tuchola
- Gmina: Kęsowo
- Population: 851
- Time zone: UTC+1 (CET)
  - Summer (DST): UTC+2 (CEST)
- Vehicle registration: CTU

Żalno [ˈʐalnɔ] is a village in the administrative district of Gmina Kęsowo, within Tuchola County, Kuyavian-Pomeranian Voivodeship, in north-central Poland.

== History ==
Żalno was a private village of the Żaliński noble family of Poraj coat of arms, administratively located in the Tuchola County in the Pomeranian Voivodeship of the Kingdom of Poland. It was annexed by Prussia in the First Partition of Poland in 1772. Following World War I, Poland regained independence and control of the village.

During the German occupation of Poland (World War II), Żalno was one of the sites of executions of Poles, carried out by the Germans in 1939 as part of the Intelligenzaktion. Polish farmers from Żalno were also among the victims of large massacres of Poles from the region, perpetrated by the Selbstschutz in 1939 in nearby Rudzki Most. In 1941, the occupiers carried out expulsions of Poles, who then were deported to forced labour in Germany, while their houses were handed over to German colonists as part of the Lebensraum policy. Further expulsions of Polish inhabitants were carried out in 1942 and 1943, and the Poles were deported to the Potulice concentration camp, and some were eventually sent to forced labour in Germany.
