= Sicinki =

- Village
- Location within Poland
- Coordinates: 53°35′33″N 17°42′29″E
- Country: Poland
- Voivodeship: Kuyavian-Pomeranian
- County: Tuchola
- Gmina: Kęsowo

Sicinki [ɕiˈt͡ɕiŋki] is a village in the administrative district of Gmina Kęsowo, within Tuchola County, Kuyavian-Pomeranian Voivodeship, in north-central Poland.
