= Przymuszewo, Kuyavian-Pomeranian Voivodeship =

Przymuszewo
- Village
- Location within Poland
- Coordinates: 53°32′42″N 17°39′7″E
- Country: Poland
- Voivodeship: Kuyavian-Pomeranian
- County: Tuchola
- Gmina: Kęsowo
- Population: 180

Przymuszewo [pʂɨmuˈʂɛvɔ] is a village in the administrative district of Gmina Kęsowo, within Tuchola County, Kuyavian-Pomeranian Voivodeship, in north-central Poland.
