= Ludwichowo, Gmina Kęsowo =

Ludwichowo
- Village
- Location within Poland
- Coordinates: 53°32′34″N 17°38′16″E
- Country: Poland
- Voivodeship: Kuyavian-Pomeranian
- County: Tuchola
- Gmina: Kęsowo
- Population: 42

Ludwichowo [ludviˈxɔvɔ] is a village in the administrative district of Gmina Kęsowo, within Tuchola County, Kuyavian-Pomeranian Voivodeship, in north-central Poland.
