= Lińsk =

Village in Kociewie

- Village
- Location within Poland
- Coordinates: 53°41′18″N 18°8′21″E
- Country: Poland
- Voivodeship: Kuyavian-Pomeranian
- County: Tuchola
- Gmina: Śliwice
- Population: 570
- Time zone: UTC+1 (CET)
  - Summer (DST): UTC+2 (CEST)
- Vehicle registration: CTU

Lińsk [liɲsk] is a village in the administrative district of Gmina Śliwice, within Tuchola County, Kuyavian-Pomeranian Voivodeship, in north-central Poland. It is located in the Tuchola Forest in the historic region of Pomerania.

== History ==
Lińsk was a private village of the Wulkowski noble family of Chomąto coat of arms, administratively located in the Świecie County in the Pomeranian Voivodeship of the Kingdom of Poland. It was annexed by Prussia in the First Partition of Poland in 1772. Following World War I, Poland regained independence and control of the village.

During the German occupation of Poland (World War II), Lińsk was one of the sites of executions of Poles, carried out by the Germans in 1939 as part of the Intelligenzaktion. A local Polish teacher was among Poles murdered in the large massacre in Rudzki Most. In 1943–1944, the occupiers also carried out expulsions of Poles, who were enslaved as forced labour of new German colonists in the region.
