= Nowy Sumin =

- Village
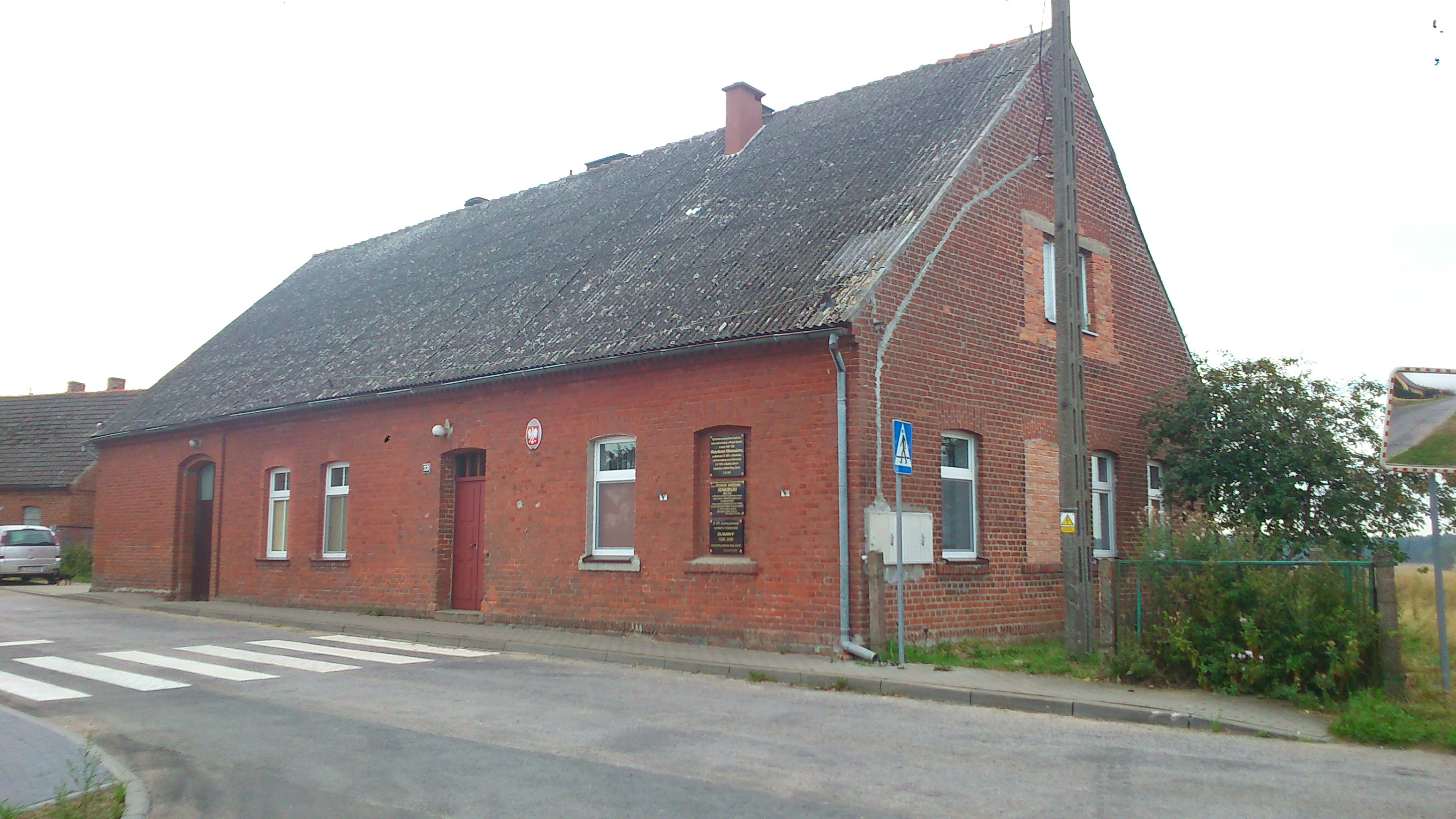
- Former school, with plaque for Otton Steinborn

- Location within Poland
- Coordinates: 53°35′20″N 17°59′12″E
- Country: Poland
- Voivodeship: Kuyavian-Pomeranian
- County: Tuchola
- Gmina: Cekcyn
- Population: 140

Nowy Sumin [ˈnɔvɨ ˈsumin] is a village in the administrative district of Gmina Cekcyn, within Tuchola County, Kuyavian-Pomeranian Voivodeship, in north-central Poland.
