= Wielkie Budziska =

- Village
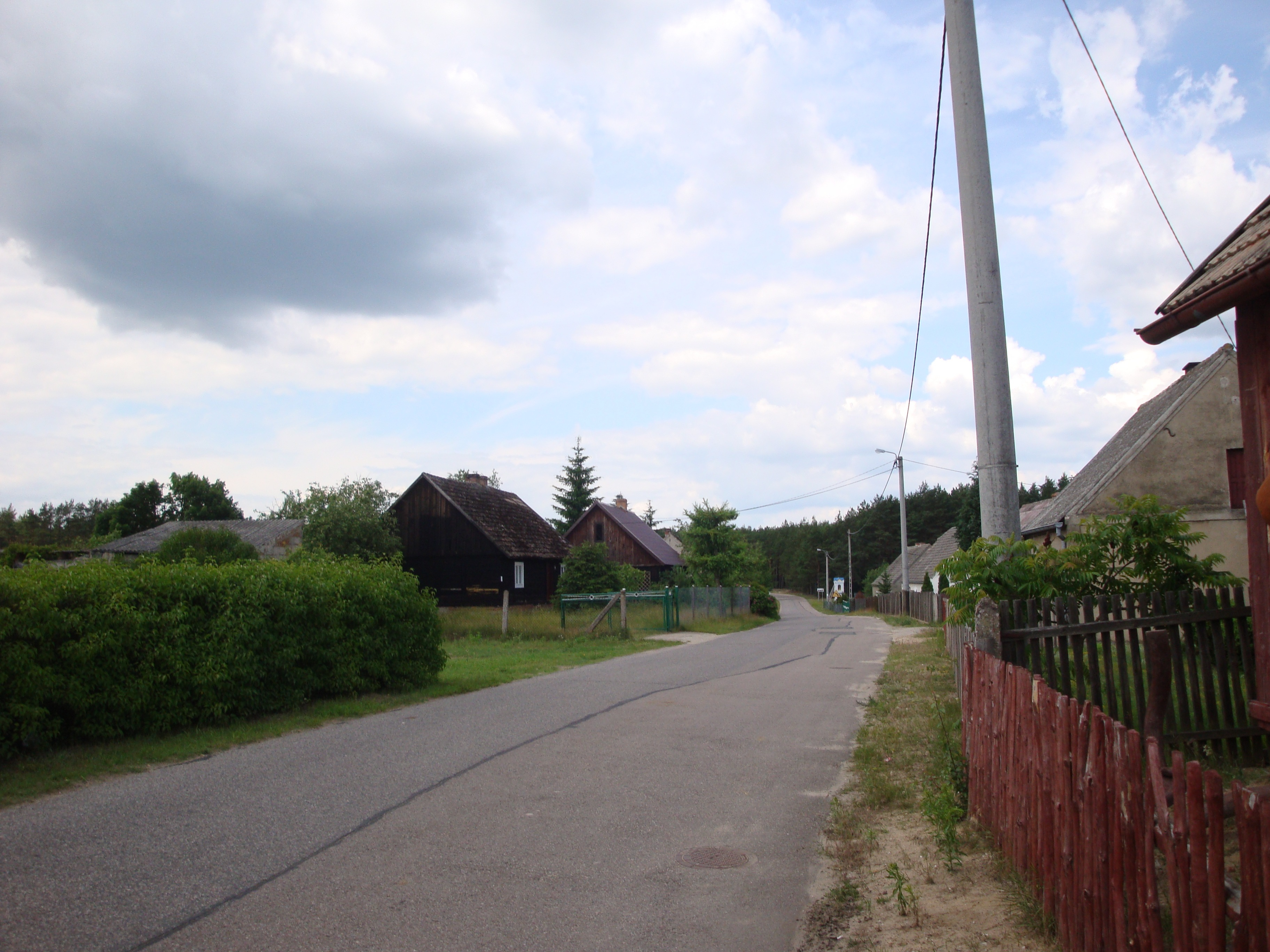

- Location within Poland
- Coordinates: 53°37′N 18°5′E
- Country: Poland
- Voivodeship: Kuyavian-Pomeranian
- County: Tuchola
- Gmina: Cekcyn
- Population: 120

Wielkie Budziska [ˈvjɛlkʲɛ buˈd͡ʑiska] is a village in the administrative district of Gmina Cekcyn, within Tuchola County, Kuyavian-Pomeranian Voivodeship, in north-central Poland.
