= Krajenki =

- Village
- Location within Poland
- Coordinates: 53°32′54″N 17°41′1″E
- Country: Poland
- Voivodeship: Kuyavian-Pomeranian
- County: Tuchola
- Gmina: Kęsowo
- Population: 150

Krajenki [kraˈjɛnki] is a village in the administrative district of Gmina Kęsowo, within Tuchola County, Kuyavian-Pomeranian Voivodeship, in north-central Poland.
