= Grochowo, Kuyavian-Pomeranian Voivodeship =

Grochowo
- Village
- Location within Poland
- Coordinates: 53°39′0″N 17°44′29″E
- Country: Poland
- Voivodeship: Kuyavian-Pomeranian
- County: Tuchola
- Gmina: Kęsowo
- Population: 70

Grochowo [ɡrɔˈxɔvɔ] is a village in the administrative district of Gmina Kęsowo, within Tuchola County, Kuyavian-Pomeranian Voivodeship, in north-central Poland.
