= Piastoszyn =

- Village
- Location within Poland
- Coordinates: 53°37′37″N 17°43′54″E
- Country: Poland
- Voivodeship: Kuyavian-Pomeranian
- County: Tuchola
- Gmina: Kęsowo
- Population: 560
- Time zone: UTC+1 (CET)
  - Summer (DST): UTC+2 (CEST)
- Vehicle registration: CTU

Piastoszyn [pjasˈtɔʂɨn] is a village in the administrative district of Gmina Kęsowo, within Tuchola County, Kuyavian-Pomeranian Voivodeship, in north-central Poland. It is located in the Tuchola Forest in the historic region of Pomerania.

== History ==
The Teutonic Order, which annexed the area from Poland in the 14th century, had installed an Ordenshof (yard of the order) in Piastoszyn. In 1454, King Casimir IV Jagiellon signed the act of reincorporation of the region to the Kingdom of Poland, what was eventually recognized by the Teutonic Knights in 1466. Within Poland, Piastoszyn was a royal village of the Polish Crown, administratively located in the Tuchola County in the Pomeranian Voivodeship. In 1744 Paweł Rhode used to be Schulz and Oberschulz of Piastoszyn. It is documented, that Franz Lucowicz bought the village from royal starost Michał Antoni Sapieha in 1753 who gave it to the municipal of Piastoszynlater: He assigned it to Schulz (village major, lat. sculteto) Andreas Behrendt, son of Laurentius Behrendt, and the whole village in Piastoszyn. Andreas Behrendt and his wife Helene Elisabeth Patin from Ciechocin had been acknowledged by Polish King Stanisław August Poniatowski as Schulz of Piastoszyn during the same year. Andreas Behrendt's successor was his son Anton Berendt, followed by Anton Berendt's son Anton Joseph Behrendt.

In 1772 the village was annexed by Prussia in the First Partition of Poland. In 1773 Petztin had 202 inhabitants including Schulz Andreas Behrendt. The following farmers were documented: Thomas Klunder, Casimir Schwemin, Paul Scheffts, Lorentz Schreiber, Adam Gehrs, Mattes Weyland, Martin Klinger Lorentz Scheffts, Krüger Johann Weyland, Georg Behrendt, Mattes Goersch and Lorentz Görsch. From 1882 to 1885 Joseph Behrendt was a member of parliament for the electoral district Konitz-Tuchel. His son August Maria Behrendt inherited the commission. He was followed by his sons Maria Leo Behrendt and Johannes Behrendt. The village was reintegrated with Poland, after the country regained independence in 1918, following World War I.

During the German occupation of Poland (World War II), several Polish inhabitants of Piastoszyn were among over 50 Poles murdered by the Germans in Rudzki Most on October 24, 1939 (see also Nazi crimes against the Polish nation).

In 1975–1998 Piastoszyn administratively belonged to the Bydgoszcz Voivodeship.
