= Komierowo =

- Village
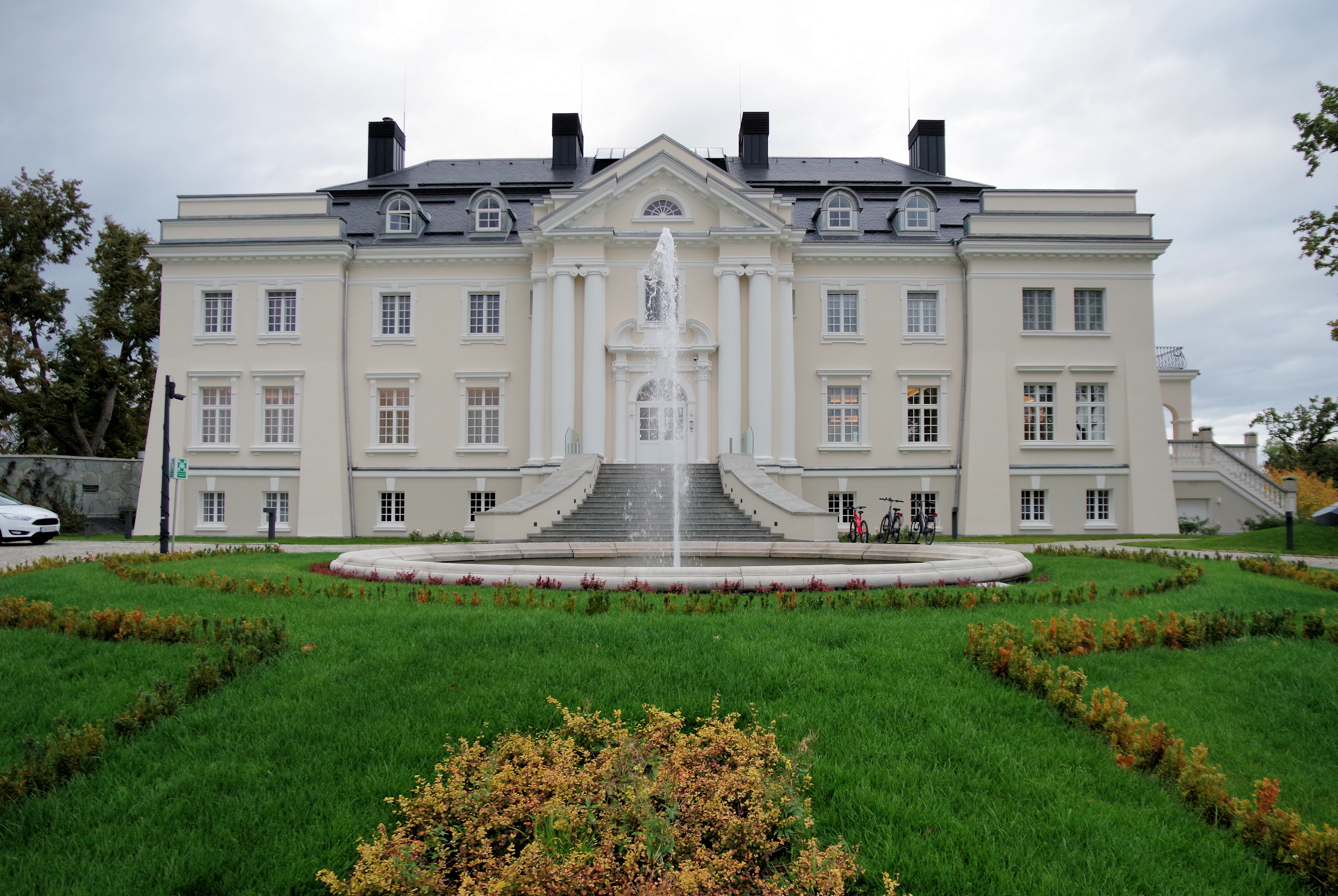
- Palace in Komierowo

- Location within Poland
- Coordinates: 53°27′N 17°40′E
- Country: Poland
- Voivodeship: Kuyavian-Pomeranian
- County: Sępólno
- Gmina: Sępólno Krajeńskie

Population
  - Total: 340
- Time zone: UTC+1 (CET)
  - Summer (DST): UTC+2 (CEST)
- Vehicle registration: CSE

Komierowo [kɔmjɛˈrɔvɔ] is a village in the administrative district of Gmina Sępólno Krajeńskie, within Sępólno County, Kuyavian-Pomeranian Voivodeship, in north-central Poland.

Five Polish citizens were murdered by Nazi Germany in the village during World War II.
