= Krąg, Kuyavian-Pomeranian Voivodeship =

Krąg
- Village
- Location within Poland
- Coordinates: 53°44′39″N 18°3′37″E
- Country: Poland
- Voivodeship: Kuyavian-Pomeranian
- County: Tuchola
- Gmina: Śliwice
- Population: 100

Krąg [krɔnk] Krąg is a village in the administrative district of Gmina Śliwice, within Tuchola County, Kuyavian-Pomeranian Voivodeship, in north-central Poland.
