= Rudzki Młyn =

- Village
- Location within Poland
- Coordinates: 53°33′17″N 17°54′17″E
- Country: Poland
- Voivodeship: Kuyavian-Pomeranian
- County: Tuchola
- Gmina: Cekcyn
- Time zone: UTC+1 (CET)
  - Summer (DST): UTC+2 (CEST)
- Vehicle registration: CTU

Rudzki Młyn [ˈrut͡ski ˈmwɨn] is a village in the administrative district of Gmina Cekcyn, within Tuchola County, Kuyavian-Pomeranian Voivodeship, in north-central Poland. It is located in the Tuchola Forest in the historic region of Pomerania.

Rudzki Młyn was a royal village of the Polish Crown, administratively located in the Tuchola County in the Pomeranian Voivodeship.
