= Minikowo, Tuchola County =

Minikowo
- Village
- Location within Poland
- Coordinates: 53°29′6″N 17°56′10″E
- Country: Poland
- Voivodeship: Kuyavian-Pomeranian
- County: Tuchola
- Gmina: Lubiewo
- Population: 390

Minikowo [miniˈkɔvɔ] is a village in the administrative district of Gmina Lubiewo, within Tuchola County, Kuyavian-Pomeranian Voivodeship, in north-central Poland.
