= Dąbrówka, Tuchola County =

Dąbrówka
- Village
- Location within Poland
- Coordinates: 53°39′11″N 17°52′28″E
- Country: Poland
- Voivodeship: Kuyavian-Pomeranian
- County: Tuchola
- Gmina: Tuchola
- Population: 40

Dąbrówka ([dɔmˈbrufka]; German: Dombrowka) is a village in the administrative district of Gmina Tuchola, within Tuchola County, Kuyavian-Pomeranian Voivodeship, in north-central Poland.
