= Wielki Mędromierz =

- Village
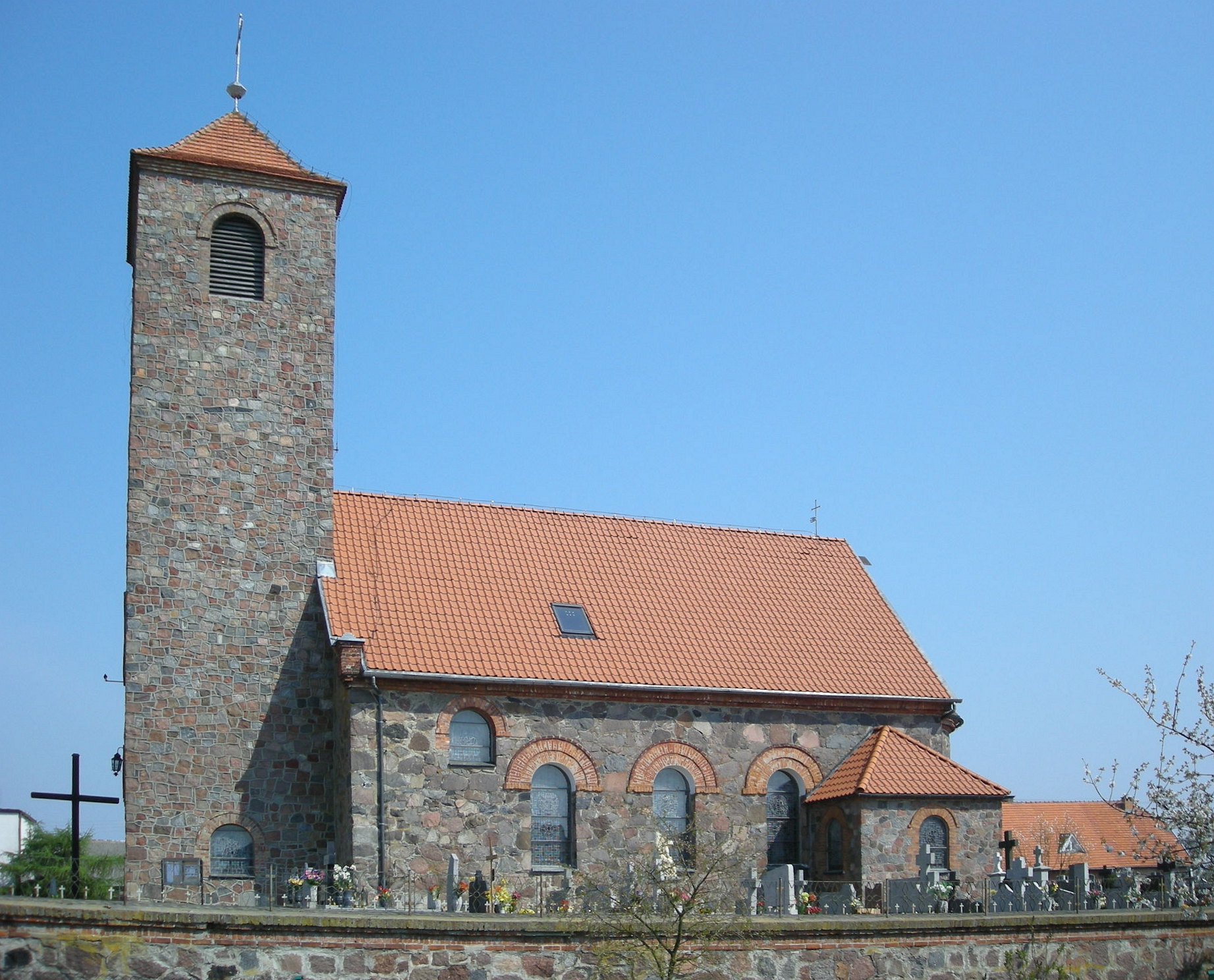
- Saint Stanislaus church in Wielki Mędromierz

- Location within Poland
- Coordinates: 53°32′11″N 17°47′54″E
- Country: Poland
- Voivodeship: Kuyavian-Pomeranian
- County: Tuchola
- Gmina: Gostycyn
- Time zone: UTC+1 (CET)
  - Summer (DST): UTC+2 (CEST)
- Vehicle registration: CTU

Wielki Mędromierz (Polish pronunciation: [ˈvjɛlkʲi mɛnˈdrɔmjɛʂ]) is a village in the administrative district of Gmina Gostycyn, within Tuchola County, Kuyavian-Pomeranian Voivodeship, in north-central Poland. It is located within the historic region of Pomerania.

== History ==
7 June 1313 is the date of the first known document to mention the village. The Święców family was buying it from the Teutonic Order.

Wielki Mędromierz was a royal village of the Polish Crown, administratively located in the Tuchola County in the Pomeranian Voivodeship.

During the German occupation of Poland (World War II), in 1940–1942 and 1944, the Germans carried out expulsions of Poles, whose houses were then handed over to Germans as part of the Lebensraum policy. Many of the expelled Poles were initially imprisoned in the Potulice concentration camp and then enslaved as forced labour of new German colonists.
