= Krzywogoniec =

- Village
- Location within Poland
- Coordinates: 53°36′04″N 18°02′23″E
- Country: Poland
- Voivodeship: Kuyavian-Pomeranian
- County: Tuchola
- Gmina: Cekcyn
- Population: 190

Krzywogoniec [kʂɨvɔˈɡɔɲɛt͡s] is a village in the administrative district of Gmina Cekcyn, within Tuchola County, Kuyavian-Pomeranian Voivodeship, in north-central Poland. A village in Poland founded by Borowiacy Tucholscy (an ethnic group in Poland).

In 1975-1998 the village administratively belonged to the Bydgoszcz Voivodeship. There are three lakes within the village: Krzywogoniec, Okoninek and Wołyczek. The village is surrounded by coniferous forests that are full of wild mushrooms, hence the nickname Krzywogoniec got in 2005: “the Mushroom Village”. The idea of a thematic village was conceived during the workshop for rural tourism leaders in Austria, and Krzywogoniec was the first thematic village in the Tuchola Forest. The thing that distinguishes Krzywogoniec from other villages is that there are plates with pictures of various mushroom species on every building in the village. Every year there is a Mushroom Festival that draws crowds of visitors. Tourists who want to taste local traditions, dishes and delicious potato pie with a mushroom relish, here known as szandar, and a local speciality, borowiacki bread, which is baked on site. Every year the Mushroom Festival is held here, which attracts many tourists
