= Trzebciny =

Village in Kociewie

- Village
- Location within Poland
- Coordinates: 53°37′48″N 18°10′8″E
- Country: Poland
- Voivodeship: Kuyavian-Pomeranian
- County: Tuchola
- Gmina: Cekcyn
- Population: 110

Trzebciny [tʂɛpˈt͡ɕinɨ] is a village in the administrative district of Gmina Cekcyn, within Tuchola County, Kuyavian-Pomeranian Voivodeship, in north-central Poland.
