= Siciny, Kuyavian-Pomeranian Voivodeship =

Siciny
- Village
- Location within Poland
- Coordinates: 53°34′13″N 17°43′44″E
- Country: Poland
- Voivodeship: Kuyavian-Pomeranian
- County: Tuchola
- Gmina: Kęsowo
- Population: 60

Siciny [ɕiˈt͡ɕinɨ] is a village in the administrative district of Gmina Kęsowo, within Tuchola County, Kuyavian-Pomeranian Voivodeship, in north-central Poland.
