= Kęsowo =

- Village
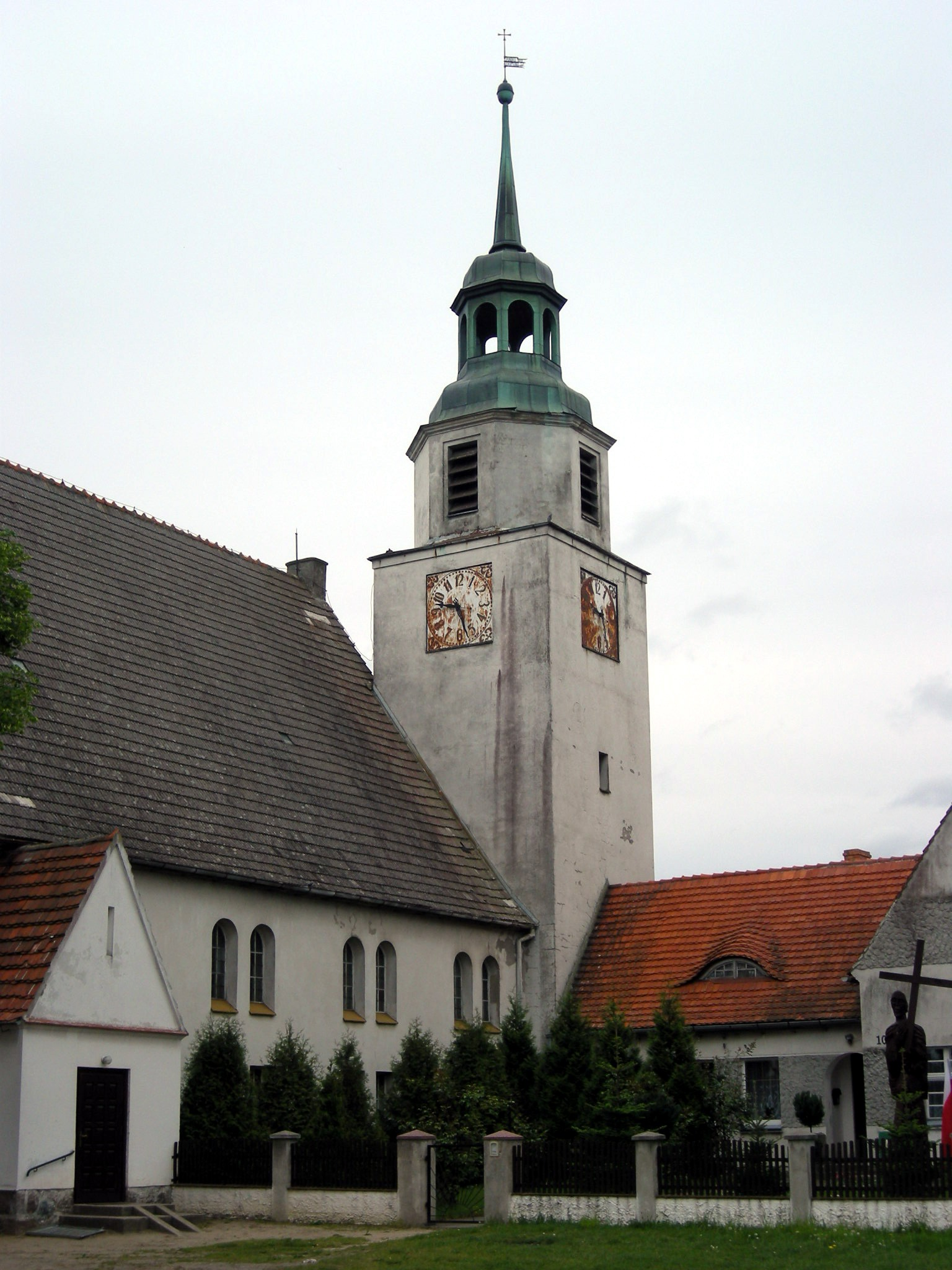
- Church of Saint Bernard

- Location within Poland
- Coordinates: 53°33′31″N 17°42′47″E
- Country: Poland
- Voivodeship: Kuyavian-Pomeranian
- County: Tuchola
- Gmina: Kęsowo

Population
  - Total: 790

Kęsowo ([kɛ̃ˈsɔvɔ]; German: Kensau) is a village in Tuchola County, Kuyavian-Pomeranian Voivodeship, in north-central Poland. It is the seat of the gmina (administrative district) called Gmina Kęsowo.
