= Rudzki Most =

- District of Tuchola
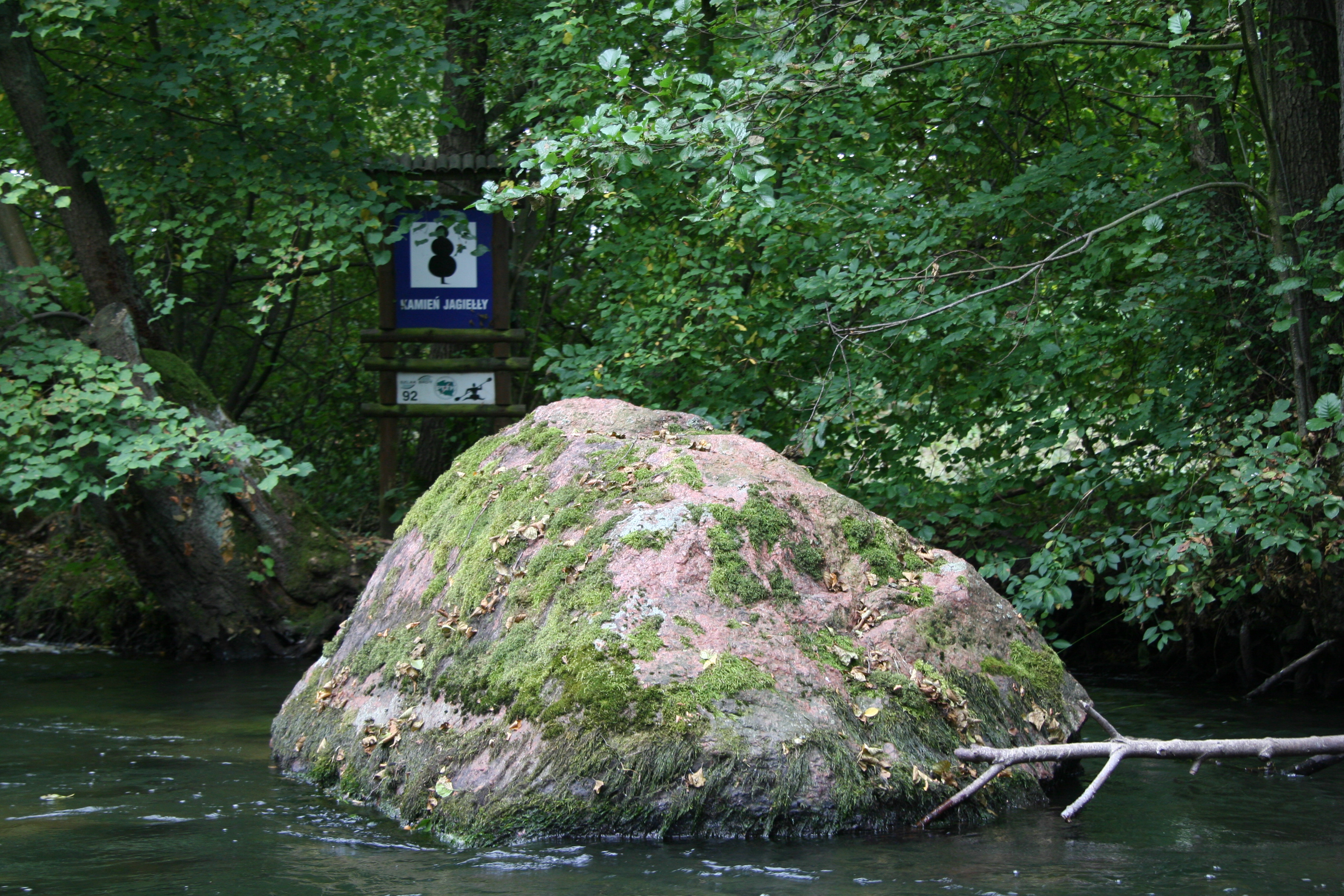
- King Jagiełło's Stone is a natural landmark near Rudzki Most.

- Location within Poland
- Coordinates: 53°34′8.93″N 17°53′33.11″E
- Country: Poland
- Voivodeship: Kuyavian-Pomeranian
- County: Tuchola
- Gmina: Tuchola
- Town: Tuchola
- Within town limits: 1955
- Time zone: UTC+1 (CET)
  - Summer (DST): UTC+2 (CEST)
- Vehicle registration: CTU

Rudzki Most ([ˈrut͡ski ˈmɔst]; German: Rudabrück) is a district of Tuchola, Poland, located in the south-eastern part of the town, along the west bank of the Brda River. It is on the edge of the Tuchola Landscape Park, and was incorporated into the town limits and jurisdiction of Tuchola in 1955.

There is a launching point for canoeing on the Brda River, and in the river near the bridge is a notable large boulder called King Jagiełło's Stone, with a circumference about 7 metres (23 ft). The Roman Catholic Parish of Divine Providence is located in the district as well.

== Etymology ==
The district takes its name from wooden bridge over the Brda, which was most recently replaced in 1958 by the current road bridge, part of route 240, and from the Ruda River, which flows through the nearby village of Rudzki Młyn.

== History ==
According to the 1921 census, the village had a population of 22, entirely Polish by nationality and Roman Catholic by confession.

=== German occupation ===
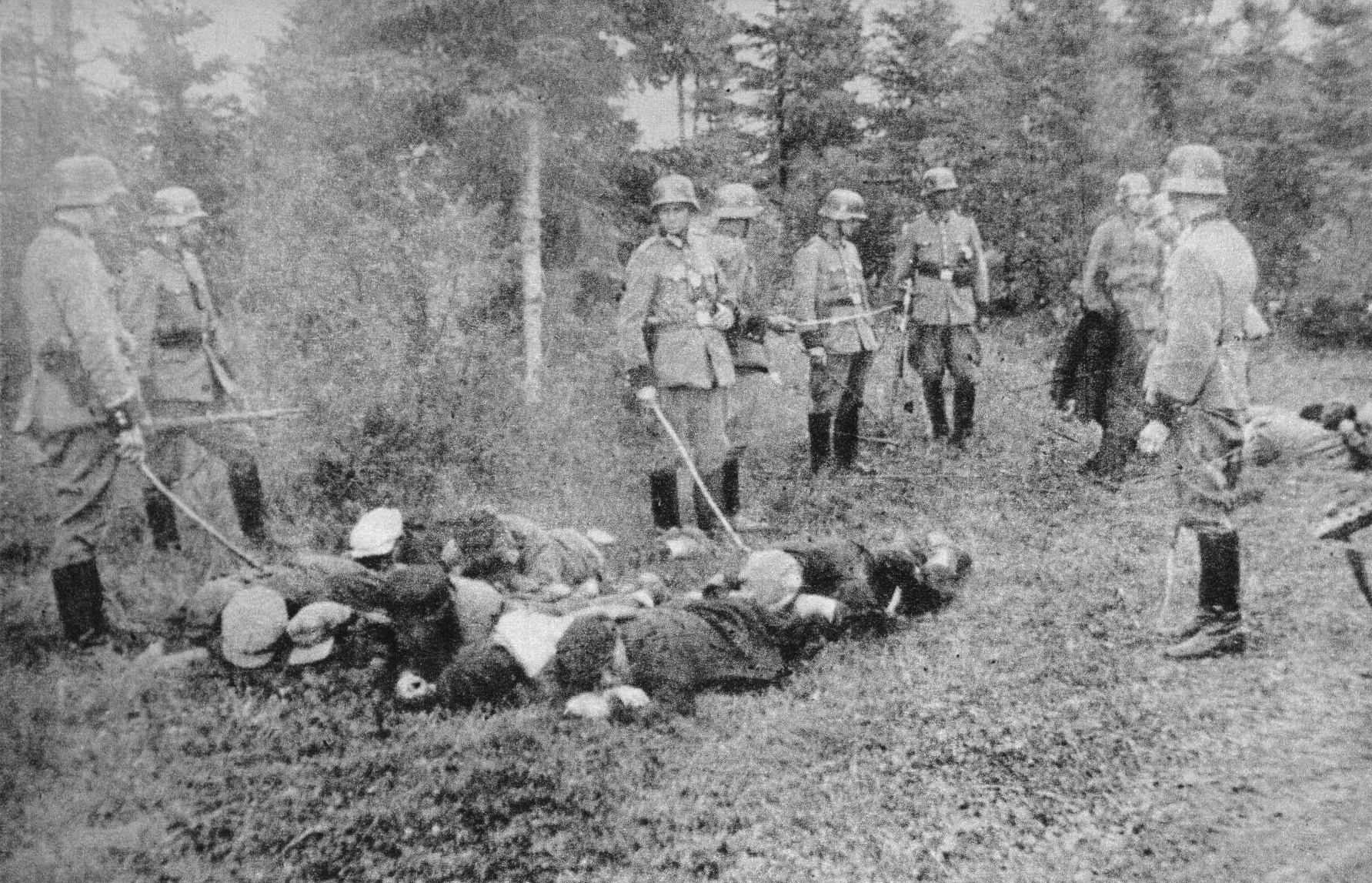
German Volksdeutscher Selbstschutz members conducted mass executions in October and November 1939 near Rudzki Most.

On October 24, 27 and 30, and on November 2, 6 and 10, 1939, at the beginning of the German occupation of Poland, Germans carried out mass shootings of local Poles, mainly of the intelligentsia as part of the larger Intelligenzaktion Pommern, in the surrounding forests. The priest Franciszek Nogalski attempted to negotiate the release of many those to be executed, but was ultimately killed himself. In 1943 the German occupiers renamed the village Raudenbrück.

After the war, in November 1946, the bones of 227 victims were exhumed, 34 of which were unidentified, and reburied in Tuchola, where a mausoleum was later built. There is now a monument at the site of the mass graves of the murdered.

== See also ==
- Rudzki Młyn
- Tuchola Forest
