= Serwitut =

Serwitut may refer to the following places:

- Serwitut (sołectwo Czarna) in Łódź Voivodeship (central Poland)
- Serwitut (sołectwo Stolec) in Łódź Voivodeship (central Poland)
- Serwitut, Opole Voivodeship (south-west Poland)
