= Lesiaki =

Lesiaki may refer to the following places:

- Lesiaki, Gmina Klonowa in Łódź Voivodeship (central Poland)
- Lesiaki, Gmina Złoczew in Łódź Voivodeship (central Poland)
- Lesiaki, Pomeranian Voivodeship (north Poland)
