= Stefanów Ruszkowski =

- Village
- Location within Poland
- Coordinates: 51°31′N 18°41′E
- Country: Poland
- Voivodeship: Łódź
- County: Sieradz
- Gmina: Brzeźnio

Stefanów Ruszkowski [stɛˈfanuf ruʂˈkɔfski] is a village in the administrative district of Gmina Brzeźnio, within Sieradz County, Łódź Voivodeship, in central Poland. It is located approximately 5 km (3 mi) north-east of Brzeźnio, 11 km (7 mi) south-west of Sieradz, and 62 km (39 mi) south-west of the regional capital Łódź.
