= Siekanie =

- Village
- Location within Poland
- Coordinates: 51°22′58″N 18°37′49″E
- Country: Poland
- Voivodeship: Łódź
- County: Sieradz
- Gmina: Złoczew

Siekanie [ɕɛˈkaɲɛ] is a village in the administrative district of Gmina Złoczew, within Sieradz County, Łódź Voivodeship, in central Poland.
