= Kliczków Wielki =

- Village
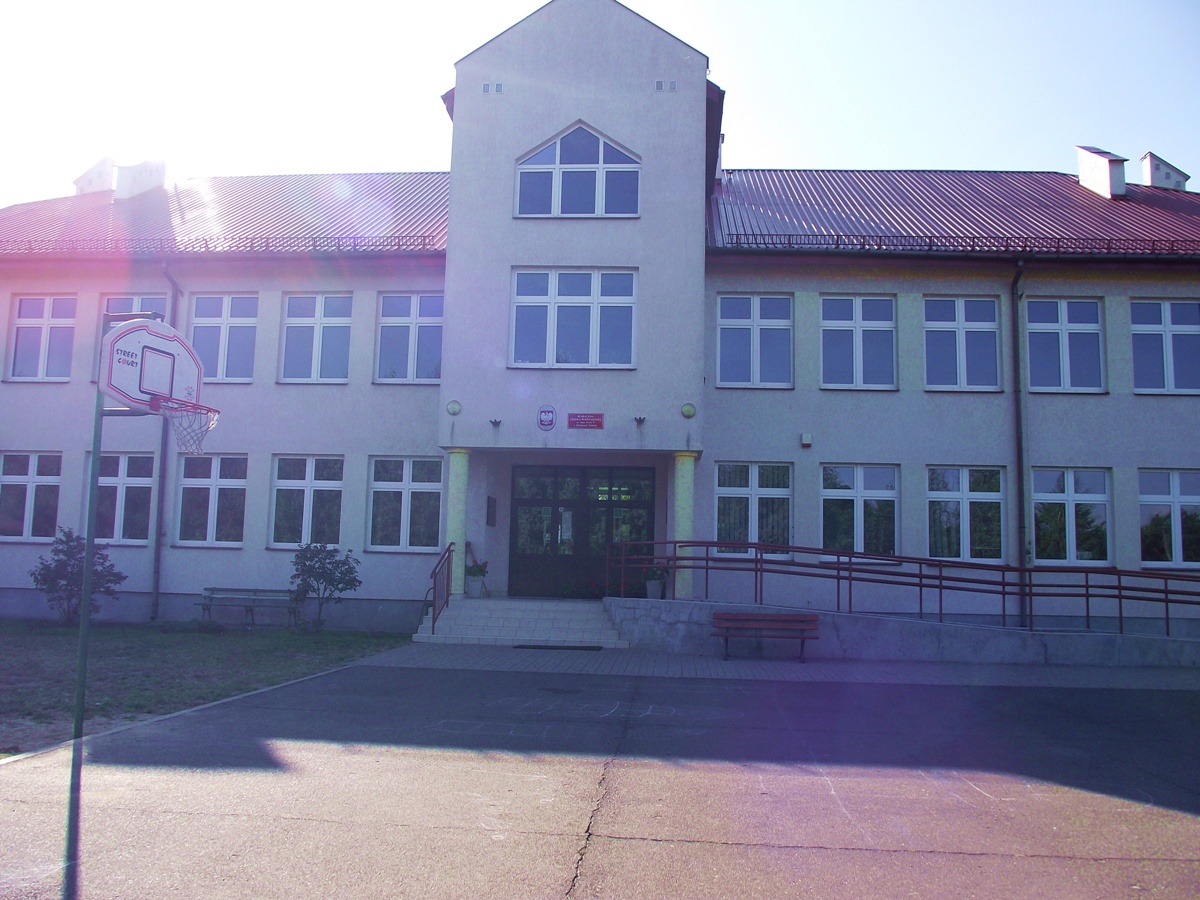
- School

- Location within Poland
- Coordinates: 51°32′6″N 18°34′18″E
- Country: Poland
- Voivodeship: Łódź
- County: Sieradz
- Gmina: Brzeźnio

Kliczków Wielki (Polish pronunciation: [ˈklitʂkuv ˈvjɛlkʲi]) is a village in the administrative district of Gmina Brzeźnio, within Sieradz County, Łódź Voivodeship, in central Poland.
