= Świątki =

Świątki may refer to the following places:

- Świątki, Łódź Voivodeship (central Poland)
- Świątki, Warmian-Masurian Voivodeship (north Poland)
- Świątki, Myślibórz County in West Pomeranian Voivodeship (north-west Poland)
- Świątki, Szczecinek County in West Pomeranian Voivodeship (north-west Poland)
