= Kuźnica Błońska =

- Village
- Location within Poland
- Coordinates: 51°27′46″N 18°24′14″E
- Country: Poland
- Voivodeship: Łódź
- County: Sieradz
- Gmina: Klonowa

Kuźnica Błońska (Polish pronunciation: [kuʑˈɲit͡sa ˈbwɔj̃ska]) is a village in the administrative district of Gmina Klonowa, within Sieradz County, Łódź Voivodeship, in central Poland.
