= Żuraw, Łódź Voivodeship =

Żuraw
- Village
- Location within Poland
- Coordinates: 51°31′25″N 18°24′19″E
- Country: Poland
- Voivodeship: Łódź
- County: Sieradz
- Gmina: Brąszewice

Żuraw [ˈʐuraf] is a village in the administrative district of Gmina Brąszewice, within Sieradz County, Łódź Voivodeship, in central Poland.
