= Ostrów, Sieradz County =

Ostrów
- Village
- Location within Poland
- Coordinates: 51°29′33″N 18°34′37″E
- Country: Poland
- Voivodeship: Łódź
- County: Sieradz
- Gmina: Brzeźnio
- Population: 460

Ostrów [ˈɔstruf] is a village in the administrative district of Gmina Brzeźnio, within Sieradz County, Łódź Voivodeship, in central Poland.
