= Stanisławów, Sieradz County =

Stanisławów
- Village
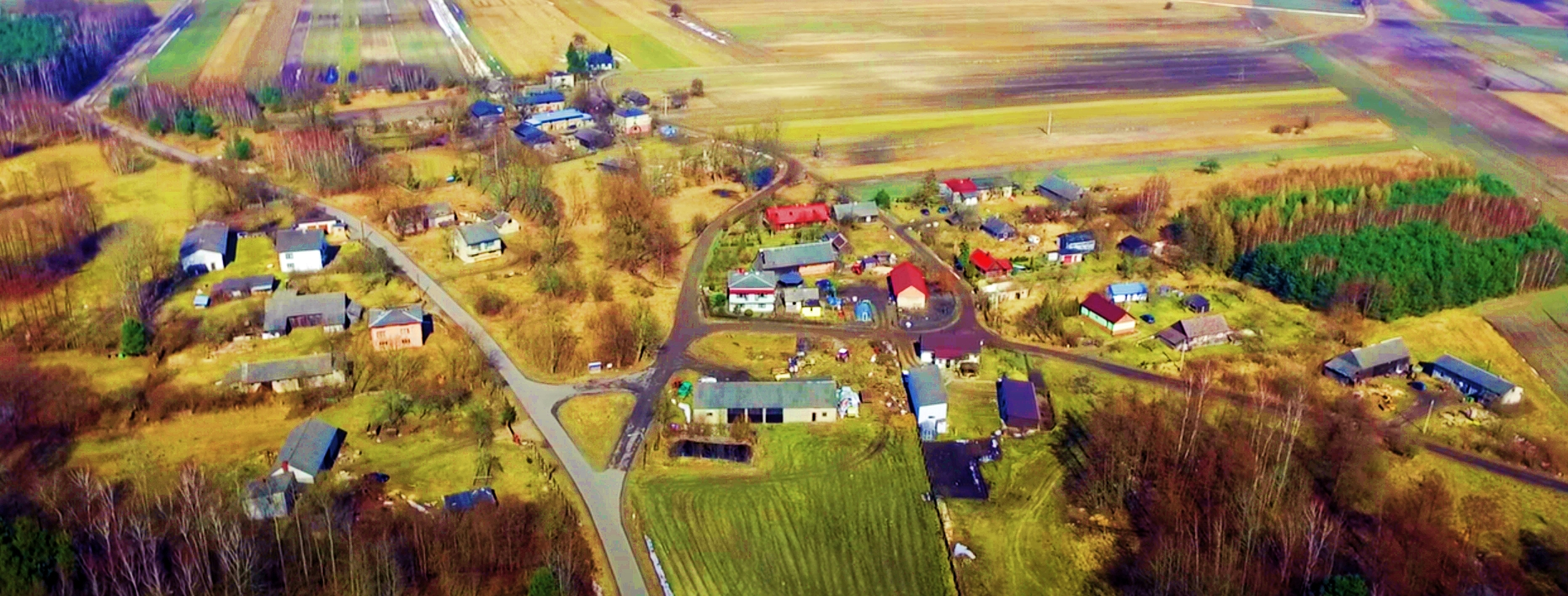

- Location within Poland
- Coordinates: 51°27′30″N 18°34′51″E
- Country: Poland
- Voivodeship: Łódź
- County: Sieradz
- Gmina: Złoczew

Stanisławów [staniˈswavuf] is a village in the administrative district of Gmina Złoczew, within Sieradz County, Łódź Voivodeship, in central Poland.
