= Zapowiednik =

- Village
- Location within Poland
- Coordinates: 51°23′48″N 18°39′29″E
- Country: Poland
- Voivodeship: Łódź
- County: Sieradz
- Gmina: Złoczew
- Population: 70

Zapowiednik [zapɔˈvjɛdnik] is a village in the administrative district of Gmina Złoczew, within Sieradz County, Łódź Voivodeship, in central Poland.
