= Rybníček =

Rybníček may refer to places in the Czech Republic:

- Rybníček (Havlíčkův Brod District), a municipality and village in the Vysočina Region
- Rybníček (Vyškov District), a municipality and village in the South Moravian Region
- Rybníček, a village and part of Brada-Rybníček in the Hradec Králové Region
- Rybníček, a village and part of Nové Hrady (Ústí nad Orlicí District) in the Pardubice Region
- Rybníček, a village and part of Pelhřimov in the Vysočina Region
- Rybníček, a village and part of Újezd (Olomouc District) in the Olomouc Region

== See also ==
- Rybník (disambiguation)
- Rybníky (disambiguation)
