= Andrzejówka, Łódź Voivodeship =

Andrzejówka
- Village
- Location within Poland
- Coordinates: 51°25′5″N 18°40′34″E
- Country: Poland
- Voivodeship: Łódź
- County: Sieradz
- Gmina: Złoczew

Andrzejówka [andʐɛˈjufka] is a village in the administrative district of Gmina Złoczew, within Sieradz County, Łódź Voivodeship, in central Poland.
