= Rybnik (disambiguation) =

Rybnik is a city in Silesian Voivodeship (south Poland).

Rybnik may also refer to:

- Rybnik, Sieradz County in Łódź Voivodeship (central Poland)
- Rybnik, Pomeranian Voivodeship (north Poland)
- Rybník (disambiguation), places in the Czech Republic and Slovakia
