= Zapole, Sieradz County =

Zapole
- Village
- Location within Poland
- Coordinates: 51°29′21″N 18°39′17″E
- Country: Poland
- Voivodeship: Łódź
- County: Sieradz
- Gmina: Brzeźnio

Zapole [zaˈpɔlɛ] is a village in the administrative district of Gmina Brzeźnio, within Sieradz County, Łódź Voivodeship, in central Poland.
