= Wólka Klonowska, Łódź Voivodeship =

Wólka Klonowska
- Village
- Location within Poland
- Coordinates: 51°30′2″N 18°28′33″E
- Country: Poland
- Voivodeship: Łódź
- County: Sieradz
- Gmina: Brąszewice

Wólka Klonowska [ˈvulka klɔˈnɔfska] is a village in the administrative district of Gmina Brąszewice, within Sieradz County, Łódź Voivodeship, in central Poland.
