= Dębołęka =

Dębołęka may refer to the following places:

- Dębołęka, Kuyavian-Pomeranian Voivodeship (north-central Poland)
- Dębołęka, Łódź Voivodeship (central Poland)
- Dębołęka, West Pomeranian Voivodeship (north-west Poland)
