= Łagiewniki, Sieradz County =

Łagiewniki
- Village
- Location within Poland
- Coordinates: 51°27′56″N 18°32′57″E
- Country: Poland
- Voivodeship: Łódź
- County: Sieradz
- Gmina: Złoczew
- Population: 70

Łagiewniki [waɡʲɛvˈniki] is a village in the administrative district of Gmina Złoczew, within Sieradz County, Łódź Voivodeship, in central Poland.
