= Obojęcie =

- Village
- Location within Poland
- Coordinates: 51°25′56″N 18°31′57″E
- Country: Poland
- Voivodeship: Łódź
- County: Sieradz
- Gmina: Złoczew

Obojęcie [ɔbɔˈjɛnt͡ɕɛ] is a village in the administrative district of Gmina Złoczew, within Sieradz County, Łódź Voivodeship, in central Poland.
