= Galbierka =

- Village
- Location within Poland
- Coordinates: 51°22′49″N 18°35′42″E
- Country: Poland
- Voivodeship: Łódź
- County: Sieradz
- Gmina: Złoczew

Galbierka [ɡalˈbjɛrka] is a village located in the administrative district of Gmina Złoczew, within Sieradz County in the Łódź Voivodeship of central Poland.
