= Gałki =

Gałki may refer to the following places:

- Gałki, Łódź Voivodeship (central Poland)
- Gałki, Gmina Gielniów in Masovian Voivodeship (east-central Poland)
- Gałki, Gmina Rusinów in Masovian Voivodeship (east-central Poland)
- Gałki, Sokołów County in Masovian Voivodeship (east-central Poland)
- Gałki, Węgrów County in Masovian Voivodeship (east-central Poland)
