= Stefanów Barczewski Pierwszy =

- Village
- Location within Poland
- Coordinates: 51°28′30″N 18°42′25″E
- Country: Poland
- Voivodeship: Łódź
- County: Sieradz
- Gmina: Brzeźnio

Stefanów Barczewski Pierwszy [stɛˈfanuf barˈt͡ʂɛfski ˈpjɛrfʂɨ] is a village in the administrative district of Gmina Brzeźnio, within Sieradz County, Łódź Voivodeship, in central Poland.
