= Kresy (disambiguation) =

Kresy is the short form of the term "Kresy Wschodnie", former Polish Eastern borderlands.

Kresy may also refer to the following villages:

- Kresy, Łódź Voivodeship (central Poland)
- Kresy, Podlaskie Voivodeship (north-east Poland)

== See also ==
- Kresy Zachodnie, or Western borderlands
