= Górki, Sieradz County =

Górki
- Village
- Location within Poland
- Coordinates: 51°24′47″N 18°33′14″E
- Country: Poland
- Voivodeship: Łódź
- County: Sieradz
- Gmina: Złoczew

Górki [ˈɡurki] is a village in the administrative district of Gmina Złoczew, within Sieradz County, Łódź Voivodeship, in central Poland.
