= Kita, Łódź Voivodeship =

Kita
- Village
- Location within Poland
- Coordinates: 51°24′03″N 18°33′30″E
- Country: Poland
- Voivodeship: Łódź
- County: Sieradz
- Gmina: Złoczew

Kita [ˈkita] is a small village in the administrative district of Gmina Złoczew.

It is located within Sieradz County, Łódź Voivodeship, in central Poland.
