= Zwierzyniec (disambiguation) =

Zwierzyniec is a Polish word for an animal park. It may refer to the following places:

- Zwierzyniec, a town in Lublin Voivodeship (east Poland)
- Zwierzyniec Brewery, a brewery in that town, belonging to the company Browary Lubelskie
- Zwierzyniec, Kraków, a district of Kraków
- Zwierzyniec, Greater Poland Voivodeship (west-central Poland)
- Zwierzyniec, Kuyavian-Pomeranian Voivodeship (north-central Poland)
- Zwierzyniec, Łódź Voivodeship (central Poland)
- Zwierzyniec, Lower Silesian Voivodeship (south-west Poland)
- Zwierzyniec, Krasnystaw County in Lublin Voivodeship (east Poland)
- Zwierzyniec, Lubusz Voivodeship (west Poland)
- Zwierzyniec, Kozienice County in Masovian Voivodeship (east-central Poland)
- Zwierzyniec, Maków County in Masovian Voivodeship (east-central Poland)
- Zwierzyniec, Wołomin County in Masovian Voivodeship (east-central Poland)
- Zwierzyniec, Podlaskie Voivodeship (north-east Poland)
- Zwierzyniec, Świętokrzyskie Voivodeship (south-central Poland)
- Zwierzyniec, Lidzbark County in Warmian-Masurian Voivodeship (north Poland)
- Zwierzyniec, Ostróda County in Warmian-Masurian Voivodeship (north Poland)
- Zwierzyniec, the Polish name for the Žvėrynas district of Vilnius
