= Uników-Kolonia =

- Village
- Location within Poland
- Coordinates: 51°24′41″N 18°32′43″E
- Country: Poland
- Voivodeship: Łódź
- County: Sieradz
- Gmina: Złoczew

Uników-Kolonia [uˈnikuf kɔˈlɔɲa] is a village in the administrative district of Gmina Złoczew, within Sieradz County, Łódź Voivodeship, in central Poland.
