= Biesiec, Łódź Voivodeship =

Biesiec
- Village
- Location within Poland
- Coordinates: 51°23′26″N 18°42′49″E
- Country: Poland
- Voivodeship: Łódź
- County: Sieradz
- Gmina: Złoczew

Biesiec [ˈbjɛɕɛt͡s] is a village in the administrative district of Gmina Złoczew, within Sieradz County, Łódź Voivodeship, in central Poland.
