= Proba =

Proba may refer to:

people

- Faltonia Betitia Proba, fourth-century Latin poet
- Anicia Faltonia Proba, her niece and the recipient of letters from Saint Augustine and Saint John Chrysostom

places

- Próba, Łódź Voivodeship, village in the administrative district of Gmina Brzeźnio, within Sieradz County, Łódź Voivodeship, in central Poland.
- Proba, Leningrad Oblast, settlement in Russia

other uses

- Proba (bug), a genus of insects in the tribe Mirini
- PROBA, a series of low-cost satellites from the European Space Agency
