= Chajew =

- Village
- Location within Poland
- Coordinates: 51°32′N 18°30′E
- Country: Poland
- Voivodeship: Łódź
- County: Sieradz
- Gmina: Brąszewice

Chajew [ˈxajɛf] is a village in the administrative district of Gmina Brąszewice, within Sieradz County, Łódź Voivodeship, in central Poland.
