= Krzaki, Łódź Voivodeship =

Krzaki
- Village
- Location within Poland
- Coordinates: 51°31′N 18°36′E
- Country: Poland
- Voivodeship: Łódź
- County: Sieradz
- Gmina: Brzeźnio
- Population: 300

Krzaki [ˈkʂaki] is a village in the administrative district of Gmina Brzeźnio, within Sieradz County, Łódź Voivodeship, in central Poland.
