= Pawelce =

- Village
- Location within Poland
- Coordinates: 51°23′42″N 18°22′42″E
- Country: Poland
- Voivodeship: Łódź
- County: Sieradz
- Gmina: Klonowa

Pawelce [paˈvɛlt͡sɛ] is a village in the administrative district of Gmina Klonowa, within Sieradz County, Łódź Voivodeship, in central Poland.
