= Kliczków-Kolonia =

Village in Gmina Brzeźnio, Poland

- Village
- Location within Poland
- Coordinates: 51°32′10″N 18°33′21″E
- Country: Poland
- Voivodeship: Łódź
- County: Sieradz
- Gmina: Brzeźnio

Kliczków-Kolonia [ˈklit͡ʂkuf kɔˈlɔɲa] is a village in the administrative district of Gmina Brzeźnio, within Sieradz County, Łódź Voivodeship, in central Poland.
