= Zawiatraki =

- Village
- Country: Poland
- Voivodeship: Łódź
- County: Sieradz
- Gmina: Złoczew

Zawiatraki [zavjaˈtraki] is a village in the administrative district of Gmina Złoczew, within Sieradz County, Łódź Voivodeship, in central Poland.
