= Koźliny =

Koźliny may refer to the following places:

- Koźliny, Kuyavian-Pomeranian Voivodeship (north-central Poland)
- Koźliny, Łódź Voivodeship (central Poland)
- Koźliny, Pomeranian Voivodeship (north Poland)
