= Krzyżanka, Łódź Voivodeship =

Krzyżanka
- Village
- Location within Poland
- Coordinates: 51°22′26″N 18°40′18″E
- Country: Poland
- Voivodeship: Łódź
- County: Sieradz
- Gmina: Złoczew

Krzyżanka [kʂɨˈʐanka] is a village in the administrative district of Gmina Złoczew, within Sieradz County, Łódź Voivodeship, in central Poland.
