= Czartoryja, Łódź Voivodeship =

Czartoryja
- Village
- Location within Poland
- Coordinates: 51°29′45″N 18°29′35″E
- Country: Poland
- Voivodeship: Łódź
- County: Sieradz
- Gmina: Brąszewice

Czartoryja [t͡ʂartɔˈrɨja] is a village in the administrative district of Gmina Brąszewice, within Sieradz County, Łódź Voivodeship, in central Poland.
