= Starce =

- Village
- Location within Poland
- Coordinates: 51°28′N 18°33′E
- Country: Poland
- Voivodeship: Łódź
- County: Sieradz
- Gmina: Brąszewice

Starce [ˈstart͡sɛ] is a village in the administrative district of Gmina Brąszewice, within Sieradz County, Łódź Voivodeship, in central Poland.
