= Bujnów =

- Village
- Location within Poland
- Coordinates: 51°25′N 18°34′E
- Country: Poland
- Voivodeship: Łódź
- County: Sieradz
- Gmina: Złoczew

Bujnów [ˈbui̯nuf] is a village in the administrative district of Gmina Złoczew, within Sieradz County, Łódź Voivodeship, in central Poland.
