= Barczew =

- Village
- Location within Poland
- Coordinates: 51°29′N 18°42′E
- Country: Poland
- Voivodeship: Łódź
- County: Sieradz
- Gmina: Brzeźnio

Barczew [ˈbart͡ʂɛf] is a village in the administrative district of Gmina Brzeźnio, within Sieradz County, Łódź Voivodeship, in central Poland.
