= Grójec Wielki-Gajówka =

- Village
- Location within Poland
- Coordinates: 51°25′48″N 18°31′56″E
- Country: Poland
- Voivodeship: Łódź
- County: Sieradz
- Gmina: Złoczew

Grójec Wielki-Gajówka (Polish pronunciation: [ˈɡrujɛts ˈfjɛlkʲi ɡaˈjufka]) is a village in the administrative district of Gmina Złoczew, within Sieradz County, Łódź Voivodeship, in central Poland.
