= Jaryszek =

- Village
- Location within Poland
- Coordinates: 51°24′29″N 18°33′03″E
- Country: Poland
- Voivodeship: Łódź
- County: Sieradz
- Gmina: Złoczew

Jaryszek [jaˈrɨʂɛk] is a village in the administrative district of Gmina Złoczew, within Sieradz County, Łódź Voivodeship, in central Poland.
