= Miklesz =

- Village
- Location within Poland
- Coordinates: 51°24′27″N 18°38′13″E
- Country: Poland
- Voivodeship: Łódź
- County: Sieradz
- Gmina: Złoczew

Miklesz [ˈmiklɛʂ] is a village in the administrative district of Gmina Złoczew, within Sieradz County, Łódź Voivodeship, in central Poland.The ethnic majority are Polish.
