= Wandalin =

Wandalin may refer to the following places:

- Wandalin, Łódź Voivodeship (central Poland)
- Wandalin, Lublin Voivodeship (east Poland)
- Wandalin, Podlaskie Voivodeship (north-east Poland)
