= Kamasówka =

Village in Gmina Złoczew, Poland

- Village
- Location within Poland
- Coordinates: 51°27′07″N 18°35′33″E
- Country: Poland
- Voivodeship: Łódź
- County: Sieradz
- Gmina: Złoczew

Kamasówka [kamaˈsufka] is a village in the administrative district of Gmina Złoczew, within Sieradz County, Łódź Voivodeship, in central Poland.
