= Bronisławów, Sieradz County =

Bronisławów
- Village
- Location within Poland
- Coordinates: 51°29′29″N 18°37′27″E
- Country: Poland
- Voivodeship: Łódź
- County: Sieradz
- Gmina: Brzeźnio

Bronisławów [brɔniˈswavuf] is a village in the administrative district of Gmina Brzeźnio, within Sieradz County, Łódź Voivodeship, in central Poland.
