= Jaźwiny =

Jaźwiny may refer to the following places in Poland:

- Jaźwiny, Lower Silesian Voivodeship (south-west Poland)
- Jaźwiny, Lublin Voivodeship (east Poland)
- Jaźwiny, Łódź Voivodeship (central Poland)
- Jaźwiny, Subcarpathian Voivodeship (south-east Poland)
- Jaźwiny, Gmina Borowie in Masovian Voivodeship (east-central Poland)
- Jaźwiny, Gmina Pilawa in Masovian Voivodeship (east-central Poland)
- Jaźwiny, Przasnysz County in Masovian Voivodeship (east-central Poland)
- Jaźwiny, Sierpc County in Masovian Voivodeship (east-central Poland)
- Jaźwiny, Konin County in Greater Poland Voivodeship (west-central Poland)
- Jaźwiny, Krotoszyn County in Greater Poland Voivodeship (west-central Poland)
- Jaźwiny, Ostrzeszów County in Greater Poland Voivodeship (west-central Poland)
- Jaźwiny, Silesian Voivodeship (south Poland)
- Jaźwiny, Choszczno County in West Pomeranian Voivodeship (north-west Poland)
- Jaźwiny, Świdwin County in West Pomeranian Voivodeship (north-west Poland)
