= Jeże =

Jeże may refer to the following places:

- Jeże, Łódź Voivodeship (central Poland)
- Jeże, Lubusz Voivodeship (west Poland)
- Jeże, Masovian Voivodeship (east-central Poland)
- Jeże, Pomeranian Voivodeship (north Poland)
- Jeże, Warmian-Masurian Voivodeship (north Poland)
