= Czarna, Łódź Voivodeship =

Czarna
- Village
- Location within Poland
- Coordinates: 51°23′36″N 18°37′55″E
- Country: Poland
- Voivodeship: Łódź
- County: Sieradz
- Gmina: Złoczew

Czarna [ˈt͡ʂarna] is a village in the administrative district of Gmina Złoczew, within Sieradz County, Łódź Voivodeship, in central Poland.
