= Wandalin nad Szosą =

- Village
- Location within Poland
- Coordinates: 51°24′6″N 18°31′25″E
- Country: Poland
- Voivodeship: Łódź
- County: Sieradz
- Gmina: Złoczew

Wandalin nad Szosą [vanˈdalin ˌnat ˈʂɔsɔ̃] is a village in the administrative district of Gmina Złoczew, within Sieradz County, Łódź Voivodeship, in central Poland.
