= Sokolenie =

- Village
- Location within Poland
- Coordinates: 51°28′N 18°28′E
- Country: Poland
- Voivodeship: Łódź
- County: Sieradz
- Gmina: Brąszewice

Sokolenie [sɔkɔˈlɛɲɛ] is a village in the administrative district of Gmina Brąszewice, within Sieradz County, Łódź Voivodeship, in central Poland.
