= Owieczki =

Owieczki may refer to the following places:

- Owieczki, Gniezno County in Greater Poland Voivodeship (west-central Poland)
- Owieczki, Łódź Voivodeship (central Poland)
- Owieczki, Podlaskie Voivodeship (north-east Poland)
- Owieczki, Oborniki County in Greater Poland Voivodeship (west-central Poland)
