= Pustelnik =

Pustelnik may refer to the following places in Poland:

- Pustelnik, Lower Silesian Voivodeship (south-west Poland)
- Pustelnik, Lublin Voivodeship (east Poland)
- Pustelnik, Łódź Voivodeship (central Poland)
- Pustelnik, Marki — part of the Marki city
- Pustelnik, Mińsk County in Masovian Voivodeship (east-central Poland)
- Pustelnik, Sokołów County in Masovian Voivodeship (east-central Poland)
