= Złotowizna =

- Village
- Location within Poland
- Coordinates: 51°32′3″N 18°35′46″E
- Country: Poland
- Voivodeship: Łódź
- County: Sieradz
- Gmina: Brzeźnio

Złotowizna [zwɔtɔˈvizna] is a village in the administrative district of Gmina Brzeźnio, within Sieradz County, Łódź Voivodeship, in central Poland.
