= Rydzew =

- Village
- Location within Poland
- Coordinates: 51°30′13″N 18°33′16″E
- Country: Poland
- Voivodeship: Łódź
- County: Sieradz
- Gmina: Brzeźnio

Rydzew [ˈrɨd͡zɛf] is a village in the administrative district of Gmina Brzeźnio, within Sieradz County, Łódź Voivodeship, in central Poland.
