= Przerwa, Łódź Voivodeship =

Przerwa
- Village
- Location within Poland
- Coordinates: 51°22′52″N 18°34′54″E
- Country: Poland
- Voivodeship: Łódź
- County: Sieradz
- Gmina: Złoczew

Przerwa [ˈpʂɛrva] is a village in the administrative district of Gmina Złoczew, within Sieradz County, Łódź Voivodeship, in central Poland.
