= Szklana Huta =

Szklana Huta may refer to the following places:

- Szklana Huta, Kuyavian-Pomeranian Voivodeship (north-central Poland)
- Szklana Huta, Łódź Voivodeship (central Poland)
- Szklana Huta, Świętokrzyskie Voivodeship (south-central Poland)
- Szklana Huta, Greater Poland Voivodeship (west-central Poland)
- Szklana Huta, Silesian Voivodeship (south Poland)
- Szklana Huta, Pomeranian Voivodeship
- Szklana Huta, Kartuzy County in Pomeranian Voivodeship (north Poland)
- Szklana Huta, Wejherowo County in Pomeranian Voivodeship (north Poland)
