= Struga, Łódź Voivodeship =

Struga
- Village
- Location within Poland
- Coordinates: 51°22′27″N 18°39′3″E
- Country: Poland
- Voivodeship: Łódź
- County: Sieradz
- Gmina: Złoczew

Struga [ˈstruɡa] is a village in the administrative district of Gmina Złoczew, within Sieradz County, Łódź Voivodeship, in central Poland.
