= Szlachecka, Łódź Voivodeship =

Szlachecka
- Village
- Location within Poland
- Coordinates: 51°24′41″N 18°32′40″E
- Country: Poland
- Voivodeship: Łódź
- County: Sieradz
- Gmina: Złoczew

Szlachecka [ʂlaˈxɛt͡ska] is a village in the administrative district of Gmina Złoczew, within Sieradz County, Łódź Voivodeship, in central Poland.
