= Stefanów Barczewski Drugi =

- Village
- Location within Poland
- Coordinates: 51°28′25″N 18°41′44″E
- Country: Poland
- Voivodeship: Łódź
- County: Sieradz
- Gmina: Brzeźnio

Stefanów Barczewski Drugi [stɛˈfanuf barˈt͡ʂɛfski ˈdruɡi] is a village in the administrative district of Gmina Brzeźnio, within Sieradz County, Łódź Voivodeship, in central Poland.
