= Trzcinka, Łódź Voivodeship =

Trzcinka
- Village
- Location within Poland
- Coordinates: 51°32′1″N 18°23′58″E
- Country: Poland
- Voivodeship: Łódź
- County: Sieradz
- Gmina: Brąszewice

Trzcinka [ˈtʂt͡ɕiŋka] is a village in the administrative district of Gmina Brąszewice, within Sieradz County, Łódź Voivodeship, in central Poland.
