= Wierzbowa, Sieradz County =

Wierzbowa
- Village
- Location within Poland
- Coordinates: 51°27′35″N 18°41′3″E
- Country: Poland
- Voivodeship: Łódź
- County: Sieradz
- Gmina: Brzeźnio

Wierzbowa [vjɛʐˈbɔva] is a village in the administrative district of Gmina Brzeźnio, within Sieradz County, Łódź Voivodeship, in central Poland.
