= Kamasze =

- Village
- Location within Poland
- Coordinates: 51°25′15″N 18°32′24″E
- Country: Poland
- Voivodeship: Łódź
- County: Sieradz
- Gmina: Złoczew

Kamasze [kaˈmaʂɛ] is a village in the administrative district of Gmina Złoczew, within Sieradz County, Łódź Voivodeship, in central Poland.
