= Kuźnica Zagrzebska =

- Village
- Location within Poland
- Coordinates: 51°28′7″N 18°23′15″E
- Country: Poland
- Voivodeship: Łódź
- County: Sieradz
- Gmina: Klonowa

Kuźnica Zagrzebska (Polish pronunciation: [kuʑˈɲit͡sa zaˈɡʐɛpska]) is a village in the administrative district of Gmina Klonowa, within Sieradz County, Łódź Voivodeship, in central Poland.
