= Rembów, Sieradz County =

Rembów
- Village
- Location within Poland
- Coordinates: 51°29′1″N 18°38′19″E
- Country: Poland
- Voivodeship: Łódź
- County: Sieradz
- Gmina: Brzeźnio

Rembów [ˈrɛmbuf] is a village in the administrative district of Gmina Brzeźnio, within Sieradz County, Łódź Voivodeship, in central Poland.
