= Grzyb =

Grzyb (Polish pronunciation: [ˈɡʐɨp]) is a surname of Polish-language origin (meaning "fungus"). Archaic feminine forms are Grzybowa (by husband), Grzybówna (by father); they still can be used colloquially. Notable people with the surname include:

- Andrzej Grzyb (born 1956), Polish politician
- Joe Thomas (born Joseph Grzyb, 1956–2024), American producer, businessman, multi-instrumentalist, and songwriter
- Kinga Grzyb (born 1982), Polish handball player
- Magdalena Grzyb (born 1984), Polish criminologist
- Rafał Grzyb (born 1983), Polish football manager and player
- Ryszard Grzyb (born 1956), Polish painter, poet, and graphic designer
- Wojciech Grzyb (born 1974), Polish footballer
- Wojciech Grzyb (born 1981), Polish volleyball player
- Wolfgang Grzyb (1940–2004), German footballer

== See also ==
- Grzyb, village in Poland
