= Stolec Poduchowny =

- Village
- Location within Poland
- Coordinates: 51°21′37″N 18°39′54″E
- Country: Poland
- Voivodeship: Łódź
- County: Sieradz
- Gmina: Złoczew

Stolec Poduchowny [ˈstɔlɛt͡s pɔduˈxɔvnɨ] is a village in the administrative district of Gmina Złoczew, within Sieradz County, Łódź Voivodeship, in central Poland.
