= Lipno, Łódź Voivodeship =

Lipno
- Village
- Location within Poland
- Coordinates: 51°26′38″N 18°41′33″E
- Country: Poland
- Voivodeship: Łódź
- County: Sieradz
- Gmina: Brzeźnio
- Population: 90

Lipno (Polish pronunciation: [ˈlipnɔ]) is a village in the administrative district of Gmina Brzeźnio, within Sieradz County, Łódź Voivodeship, in central Poland.
