= Uników, Łódź Voivodeship =

Uników
- Village
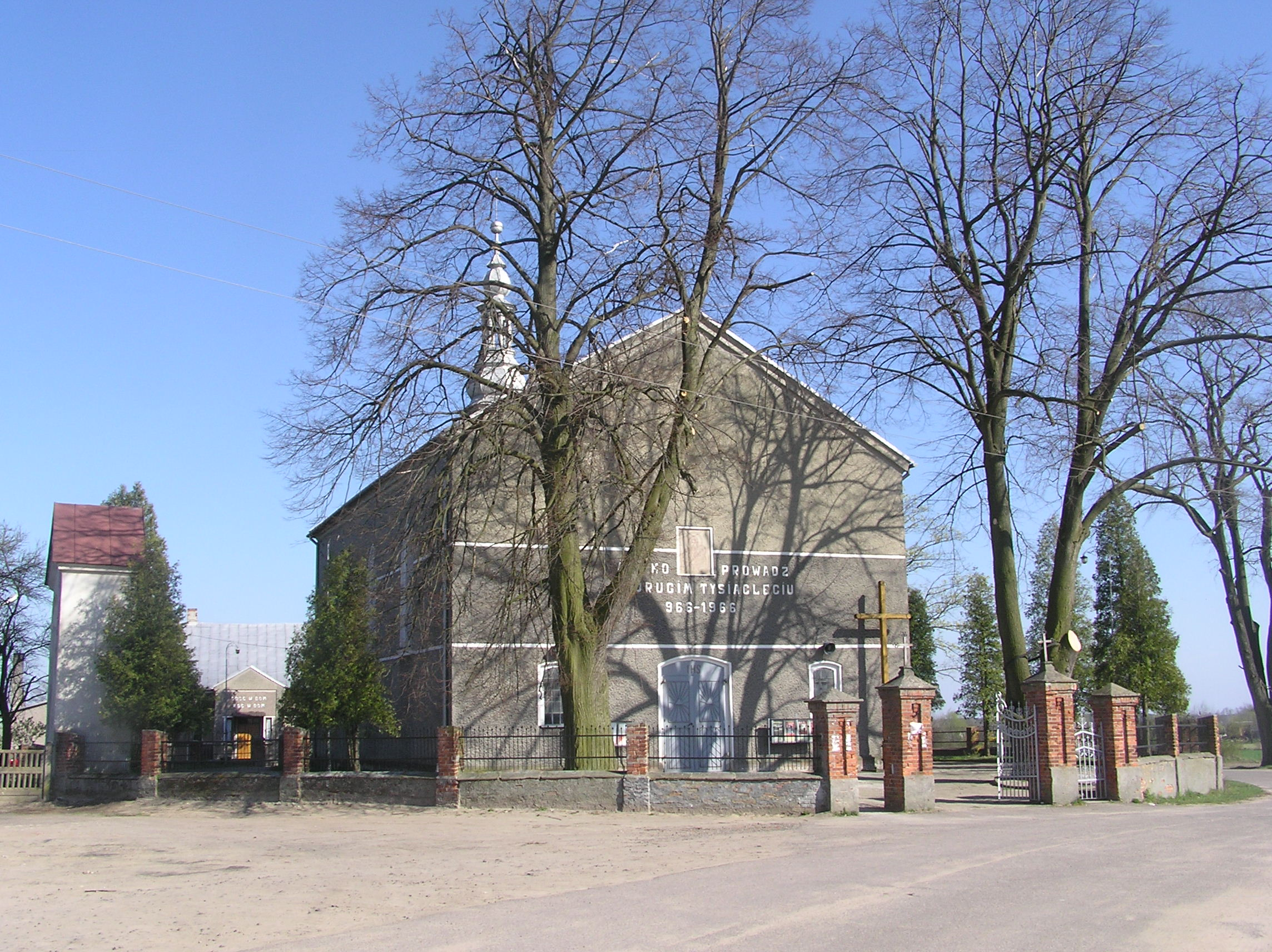
- Catholic church

- Location within Poland
- Coordinates: 51°24′3″N 18°32′38″E
- Country: Poland
- Voivodeship: Łódź
- County: Sieradz
- Gmina: Złoczew

Uników [uˈnikuf] is a village in the administrative district of Gmina Złoczew, within Sieradz County, Łódź Voivodeship, in central Poland.
