= Pieczyska, Sieradz County =

Pieczyska
- Village
- Location within Poland
- Coordinates: 51°25′50″N 18°33′51″E
- Country: Poland
- Voivodeship: Łódź
- County: Sieradz
- Gmina: Złoczew
- Population: 50

Pieczyska [pjɛˈt͡ʂɨska] is a village in the administrative district of Gmina Złoczew, within Sieradz County, Łódź Voivodeship, in central Poland.
