= Stolec =

Stolec may refer to the following places in Poland:

- Stolec, Lower Silesian Voivodeship (south-west Poland)
- Stolec, Łódź Voivodeship (central Poland)
- Stolec, West Pomeranian Voivodeship (north-west Poland)
