= Gęsina =

- Village
- Location within Poland
- Coordinates: 51°31′3″N 18°32′44″E
- Country: Poland
- Voivodeship: Łódź
- County: Sieradz
- Gmina: Brzeźnio

Gęsina [ɡɛ̃ˈɕina] is a village in the administrative district of Gmina Brzeźnio, within Sieradz County, Łódź Voivodeship, in central Poland.
