= Leliwa, Łódź Voivodeship =

Leliwa
- Village
- Location within Poland
- Coordinates: 51°24′33″N 18°22′2″E
- Country: Poland
- Voivodeship: Łódź
- County: Sieradz
- Gmina: Klonowa

Leliwa [lɛˈliva] is a village in the administrative district of Gmina Klonowa, within Sieradz County, Łódź Voivodeship, in central Poland.
