= Napłatek =

- Village
- Location within Poland
- Coordinates: 51°23′22″N 18°41′06″E
- Country: Poland
- Voivodeship: Łódź
- County: Sieradz
- Gmina: Złoczew

Napłatek [naˈpwatɛk] is a village in the administrative district of Gmina Złoczew, within Sieradz County, Łódź Voivodeship, in central Poland.
