= Podcabaje =

- Village
- Location within Poland
- Coordinates: 51°29′38″N 18°35′27″E
- Country: Poland
- Voivodeship: Łódź
- County: Sieradz
- Gmina: Brzeźnio

Podcabaje [pɔtt͡saˈbajɛ] is a village in the administrative district of Gmina Brzeźnio, within Sieradz County, Łódź Voivodeship, in central Poland.
