= Grójec Wielki-Leśniczówka =

- Village
- Location within Poland
- Coordinates: 51°25′53″N 18°34′40″E
- Country: Poland
- Voivodeship: Łódź
- County: Sieradz
- Gmina: Złoczew

Grójec Wielki-Leśniczówka (Polish pronunciation: [ˈɡrujɛts ˈfjɛlkʲi lɛɕɲiˈtʂufka]) is a village in the administrative district of Gmina Złoczew, within Sieradz County, Łódź Voivodeship, in central Poland.
