= Grójec Wielki, Łódź Voivodeship =

Grójec Wielki
- Village
- Location within Poland
- Coordinates: 51°26′42″N 18°33′27″E
- Country: Poland
- Voivodeship: Łódź
- County: Sieradz
- Gmina: Złoczew

Grójec Wielki (Polish pronunciation: [ˈɡrujɛts ˈfjɛlkʲi]) is a village in the administrative district of Gmina Złoczew, within Sieradz County, Łódź Voivodeship, in central Poland.
