= Lipiny, Gmina Złoczew =

Lipiny
- Village
- Location within Poland
- Coordinates: 51°26′35″N 18°41′47″E
- Country: Poland
- Voivodeship: Łódź
- County: Sieradz
- Gmina: Złoczew

Lipiny [liˈpinɨ] is a village in the administrative district of Gmina Złoczew, within Sieradz County, Łódź Voivodeship, in central Poland.
