= Gozdy, Łódź Voivodeship =

Gozdy
- Village
- Location within Poland
- Coordinates: 51°27′48″N 18°36′5″E
- Country: Poland
- Voivodeship: Łódź
- County: Sieradz
- Gmina: Brzeźnio

Gozdy [ˈɡɔzdɨ] is a village in the administrative district of Gmina Brzeźnio, within Sieradz County, Łódź Voivodeship, in central Poland.
