= Błota, Sieradz County =

Błota
- Village
- Location within Poland
- Coordinates: 51°29′10″N 18°24′31″E
- Country: Poland
- Voivodeship: Łódź
- County: Sieradz
- Gmina: Brąszewice

Błota [ˈbwɔta] is a village in the administrative district of Gmina Brąszewice, within Sieradz County, Łódź Voivodeship, in central Poland.
