= Lisy, Łódź Voivodeship =

Lisy
- Village
- Location within Poland
- Coordinates: 51°29′12″N 18°28′42.5″E
- Country: Poland
- Voivodeship: Łódź
- County: Sieradz
- Gmina: Brąszewice

Lisy [ˈlʲisɨ] is a village in the administrative district of Gmina Brąszewice, within Sieradz County, Łódź Voivodeship, in central Poland.
