= Nowa Wieś, Sieradz County =

Nowa Wieś
- Village
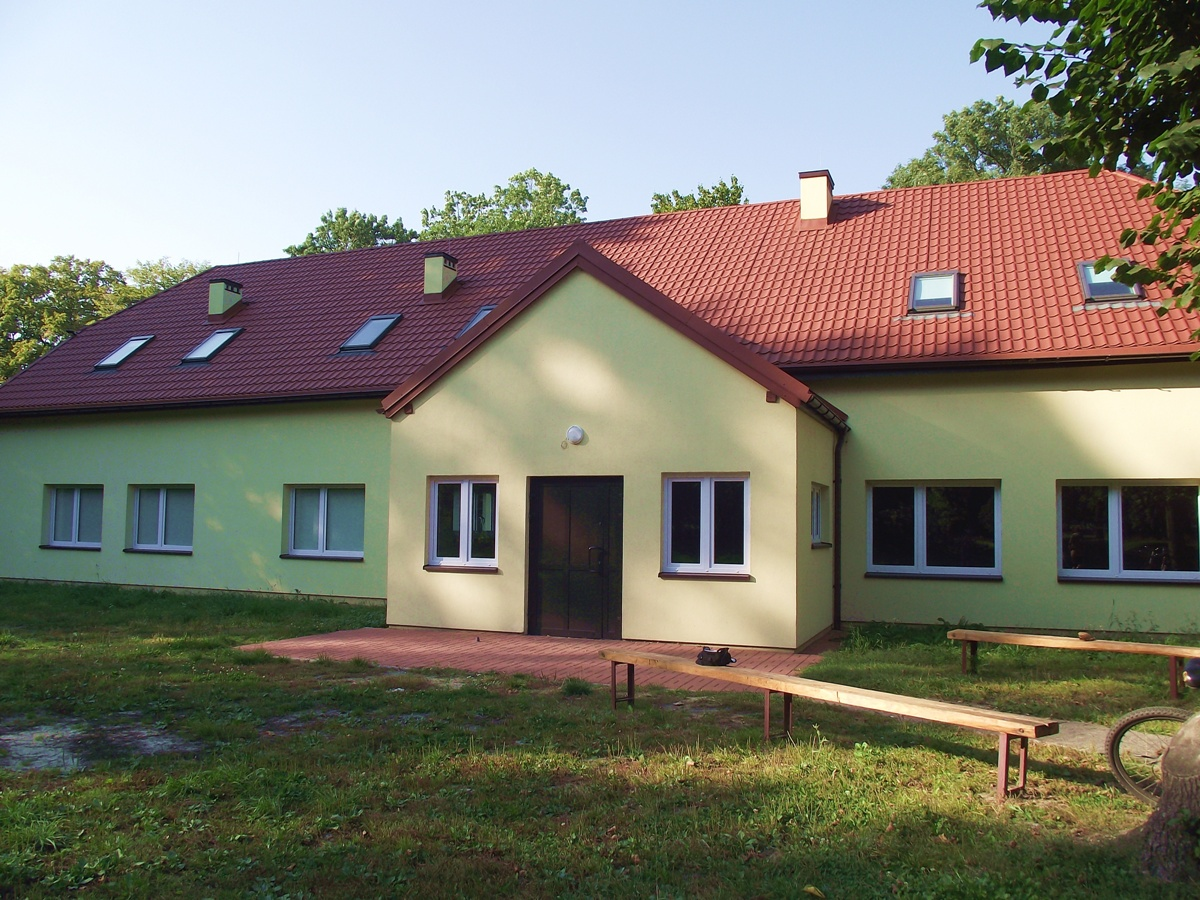

- Location within Poland
- Coordinates: 51°27′48″N 18°37′36″E
- Country: Poland
- Voivodeship: Łódź
- County: Sieradz
- Gmina: Brzeźnio

Nowa Wieś [ˈnɔva ˈvjɛɕ] is a village in the administrative district of Gmina Brzeźnio, within Sieradz County, Łódź Voivodeship, in central Poland.
