= Filipole =

- Village
- Location within Poland
- Coordinates: 51°23′2″N 18°42′7″E
- Country: Poland
- Voivodeship: Łódź
- County: Sieradz
- Gmina: Złoczew

Filipole [filiˈpɔlɛ] is a village in the administrative district of Gmina Złoczew, within Sieradz County, Łódź Voivodeship, in central Poland.
