= Stara Wieś, Sieradz County =

Stara Wieś
- Village
- Country: Poland
- Voivodeship: Łódź
- County: Sieradz
- Gmina: Złoczew

Stara Wieś [ˈstara ˈvjɛɕ] is a village in the administrative district of Gmina Złoczew, within Sieradz County, Łódź Voivodeship, in central Poland.
