= Ruszków =

Ruszków may refer to the following places:

- Ruszków, Łódź Voivodeship (central Poland)
- Ruszków, Masovian Voivodeship (east-central Poland)
- Ruszków, Świętokrzyskie Voivodeship (south-central Poland)
