= Lipicze, Łódź Voivodeship =

Lipicze
- Village
- Location within Poland
- Coordinates: 51°25′45″N 18°29′19″E
- Country: Poland
- Voivodeship: Łódź
- County: Sieradz
- Gmina: Klonowa

Lipicze [liˈpit͡ʂɛ] is a village in the administrative district of Gmina Klonowa, within Sieradz County, Łódź Voivodeship, in central Poland.
