= Emilianów, Sieradz County =

Emilianów
- Village
- Location within Poland
- Coordinates: 51°23′39″N 18°34′1″E
- Country: Poland
- Voivodeship: Łódź
- County: Sieradz
- Gmina: Złoczew

Emilianów [ɛmiˈljanuf] is a village in the administrative district of Gmina Złoczew, within Sieradz County, Łódź Voivodeship, in central Poland.
