= Grójec Mały, Łódź Voivodeship =

Grójec Mały
- Village
- Location within Poland
- Coordinates: 51°27′31″N 18°33′45″E
- Country: Poland
- Voivodeship: Łódź
- County: Sieradz
- Gmina: Złoczew

Grójec Mały [ˈɡrujɛt͡s ˈmawɨ] is a village in the administrative district of Gmina Złoczew, within Sieradz County, Łódź Voivodeship, in central Poland.
