= Kliczków Mały =

- Village
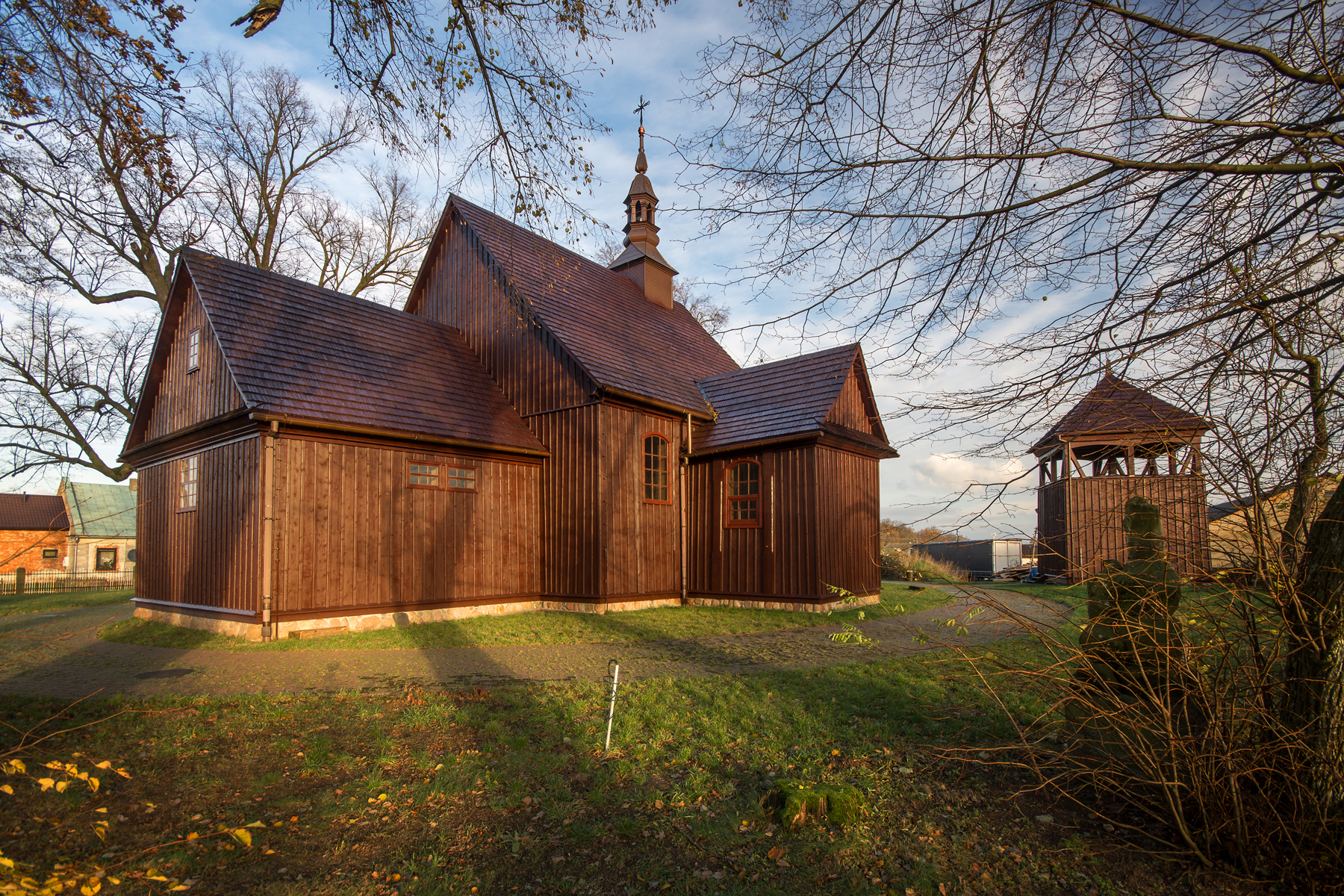
- Saint John church in Kliczków Mały

- Location within Poland
- Coordinates: 51°32′N 18°32′E
- Country: Poland
- Voivodeship: Łódź
- County: Sieradz
- Gmina: Brzeźnio

Population
  - Total: 410
- Time zone: UTC+1 (CET)
  - Summer (DST): UTC+2 (CEST)
- Postal code: 98-275
- Vehicle registration: ESI

Kliczków Mały [ˈklit͡ʂkuf ˈmawɨ] is a village in the administrative district of Gmina Brzeźnio, within Sieradz County, Łódź Voivodeship, in central Poland.
