= Godynice =

Village in Łódź Voivodeship, Poland

- Village
- Location within Poland
- Coordinates: 51°28′12″N 18°30′37″E
- Country: Poland
- Voivodeship: Łódź
- County: Sieradz
- Gmina: Brąszewice

Godynice [ɡɔdɨˈnit͡sɛ] is a village in the administrative district of Gmina Brąszewice, within Sieradz County, Łódź Voivodeship, in central Poland.
