= Borowiska =

- Village
- Location within Poland
- Coordinates: 51°28′N 18°37′E
- Country: Poland
- Voivodeship: Łódź
- County: Sieradz
- Gmina: Brzeźnio

Borowiska [bɔrɔˈviska] is a village in the administrative district of Gmina Brzeźnio, within Sieradz County, Łódź Voivodeship, in central Poland.
