= Kresy, Łódź Voivodeship =

Kresy
- Village
- Location within Poland
- Coordinates: 51°24′49″N 18°38′07″E
- Country: Poland
- Voivodeship: Łódź
- County: Sieradz
- Gmina: Złoczew

Kresy [ˈkrɛsɨ] is a village in the administrative district of Gmina Złoczew, within Sieradz County, Łódź Voivodeship, in central Poland.
