= Jaźwiny, Łódź Voivodeship =

Jaźwiny
- Village
- Location within Poland
- Coordinates: 51°23′57″N 18°40′14″E
- Country: Poland
- Voivodeship: Łódź
- County: Sieradz
- Gmina: Złoczew

Jaźwiny [jaʑˈvinɨ] is a village in the administrative district of Gmina Złoczew, within Sieradz County, Łódź Voivodeship, in central Poland.
