= Rybníky =

Rybníky may refer to places in the Czech Republic:

- Rybníky (Příbram District), a municipality and village in the Central Bohemian Region
- Rybníky (Znojmo District), a municipality and village in the South Moravian Region

== See also ==
- Rybník (disambiguation)
- Rybníček (disambiguation)
