= Grzyb, Łódź Voivodeship =

Grzyb
- Village
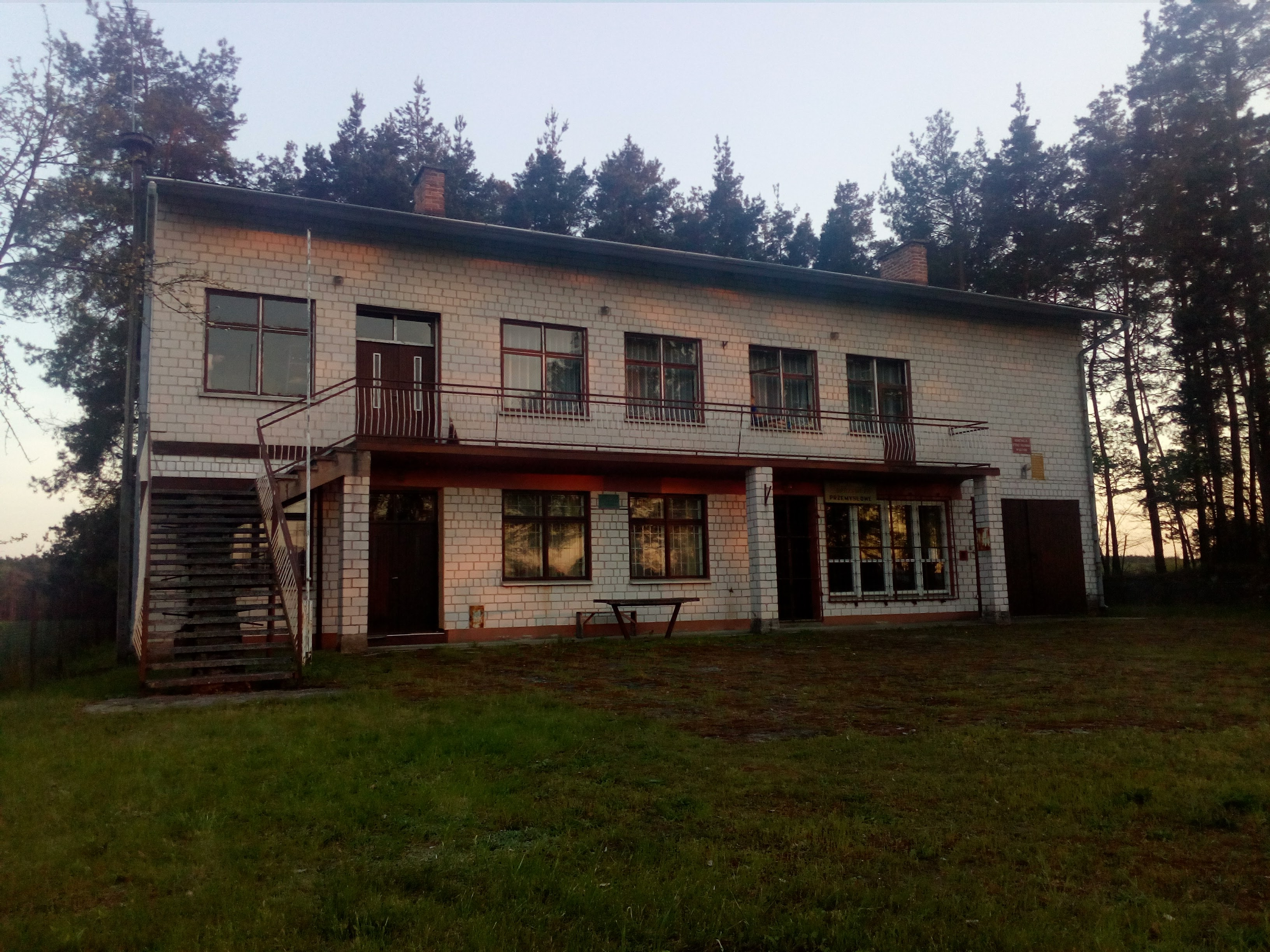
- Fire station

- Location within Poland
- Coordinates: 51°26′32″N 18°21′9″E
- Country: Poland
- Voivodeship: Łódź
- County: Sieradz
- Gmina: Klonowa

Grzyb [ɡʐɨp] is a village in the administrative district of Gmina Klonowa, within Sieradz County, Łódź Voivodeship, in central Poland.
