= Rybnik, Sieradz County =

Rybnik
- Village
- Location within Poland
- Coordinates: 51°28′21″N 18°34′49″E
- Country: Poland
- Voivodeship: Łódź
- County: Sieradz
- Gmina: Brzeźnio

Rybnik [ˈrɨbnik] is a village in the administrative district of Gmina Brzeźnio, within Sieradz County, Łódź Voivodeship, in central Poland.
