= Lesiaki, Gmina Klonowa =

Lesiaki
- Village
- Location within Poland
- Coordinates: 51°26′32″N 18°29′14″E
- Country: Poland
- Voivodeship: Łódź
- County: Sieradz
- Gmina: Klonowa

Lesiaki [lɛˈɕaki] is a village in the administrative district of Gmina Klonowa, within Sieradz County, Łódź Voivodeship, in central Poland.
