= Serwitut (sołectwo Czarna) =

Village in Gmina Złoczew, Poland

- Village
- Country: Poland
- Voivodeship: Łódź
- County: Sieradz
- Gmina: Złoczew

Serwitut [sɛrˈvitut] is a small village in the administrative district of Gmina Złoczew, within Sieradz County, Łódź Voivodeship, in the central area of Poland.
