= Koźliny, Łódź Voivodeship =

Koźliny
- Village
- Location within Poland
- Coordinates: 51°22′57″N 18°40′6″E
- Country: Poland
- Voivodeship: Łódź
- County: Sieradz
- Gmina: Złoczew

Koźliny [kɔˈʑlinɨ] is a village in the administrative district of Gmina Złoczew, within Sieradz County, Łódź Voivodeship, in central Poland.
