= Serwitut (sołectwo Stolec) =

- Village
- Location within Poland
- Coordinates: 51°22′31″N 18°39′42″E
- Country: Poland
- Voivodeship: Łódź
- County: Sieradz
- Gmina: Złoczew

Serwitut [sɛrˈvitut] is a village in the administrative district of Gmina Złoczew, within Sieradz County, Łódź Voivodeship, in central Poland.
