= Próba, Łódź Voivodeship =

Próba
- Village
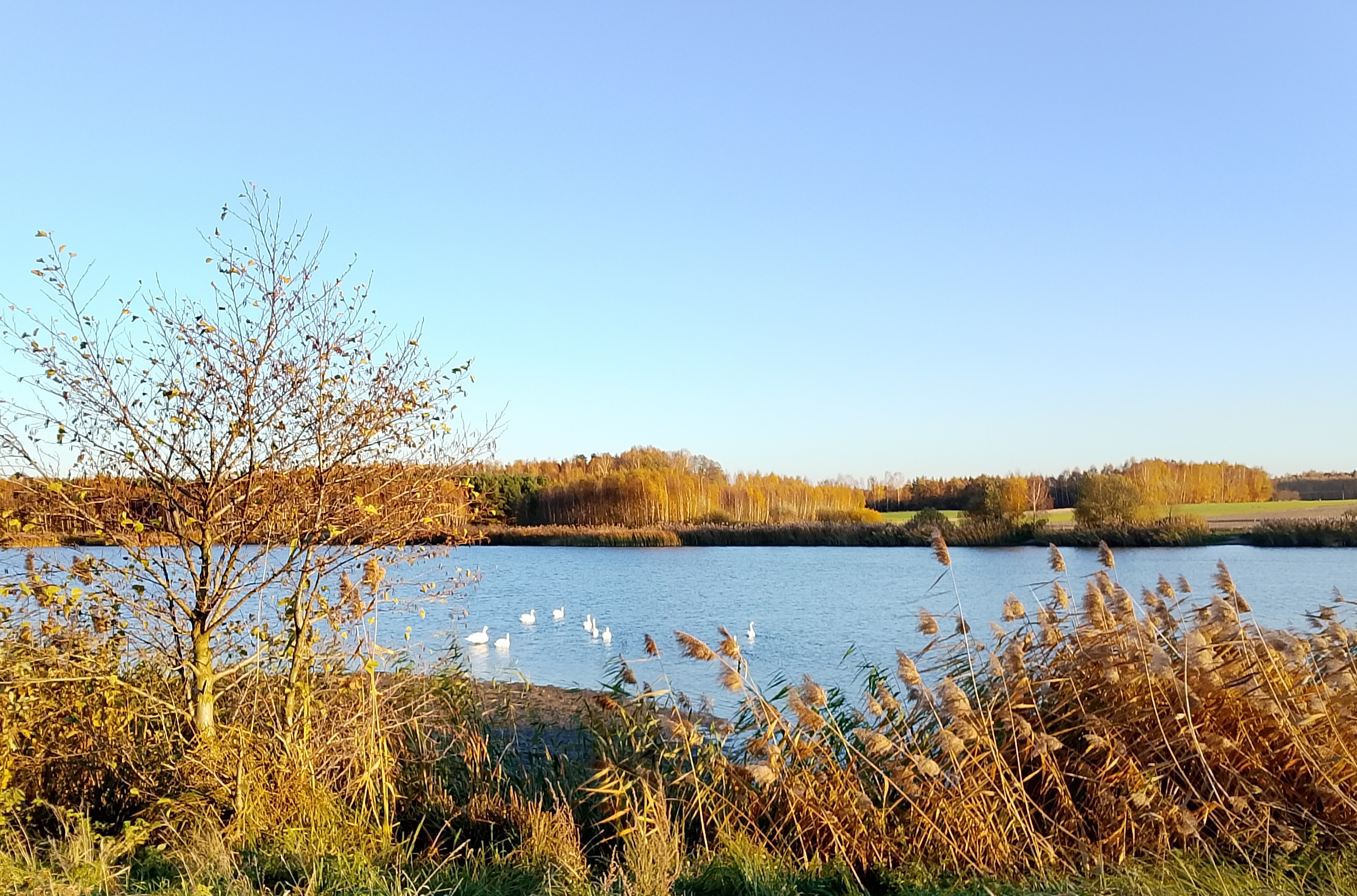

- Location within Poland
- Coordinates: 51°30′N 18°39′E
- Country: Poland
- Voivodeship: Łódź
- County: Sieradz
- Gmina: Brzeźnio

Próba [ˈpruba] is a village in the administrative district of Gmina Brzeźnio, within Sieradz County, Łódź Voivodeship, in central Poland.
