= Gałki, Łódź Voivodeship =

Gałki
- Village
- Location within Poland
- Coordinates: 51°31′38″N 18°25′57″E
- Country: Poland
- Voivodeship: Łódź
- County: Sieradz
- Gmina: Brąszewice

Gałki [ˈɡau̯ki] is a village in the administrative district of Gmina Brąszewice, within Sieradz County, Łódź Voivodeship, in central Poland.
