= Gmina Klonowa =

Gmina Klonowa Klonowa Commune
- Gmina
- Municipal hall

- Flag Coat of arms
- Interactive map of Gmina Klonowa
- Coordinates (Klonowa): 51°25′9″N 18°25′3″E
- Country: Poland
- Voivodeship: Łódź
- County: Sieradz
- Seat: Klonowa

Area
  - Total: 95.37 km^{2} (36.82 sq mi)

Population (2006)
  - Total: 3,059
  - Density: 32.08/km^{2} (83.07/sq mi)
- Time zone: UTC+1 (CET)
  - Summer (DST): UTC+2 (CEST)
- Car plates: ESI
- Website: www.klonowa.ug.gov.pl

Gmina Klonowa is a rural gmina (administrative district) in Sieradz County, Łódź Voivodeship, in central Poland. Its seat is the village of Klonowa, which lies approximately 31 kilometres (19 mi) south-west of Sieradz and 84 km (52 mi) south-west of the regional capital Łódź.

The gmina covers an area of 95.37 square kilometres (36.8 sq mi), and as of 2006, its total population is 3,059.

== Villages ==
Gmina Klonowa contains the villages and settlements of:

- Grzyb
- Klonowa
- Kuźnica Błońska
- Kuźnica Zagrzebska
- Leliwa
- Lesiaki
- Lipicze
- Owieczki
- Pawelce
- Świątki

== Neighbouring gminas ==
Gmina Klonowa is bordered by the gminas of Brąszewice, Czajków, Galewice, Lututów and Złoczew.
