= Jeże, Łódź Voivodeship =

Jeże
- Village
- Location within Poland
- Coordinates: 51°27′53″N 18°33′30″E
- Country: Poland
- Voivodeship: Łódź
- County: Sieradz
- Gmina: Złoczew

Jeże [ˈjɛʐɛ] is a village in the administrative district of Gmina Złoczew, within Sieradz County, Łódź Voivodeship, in central Poland.
