= Ruszków, Łódź Voivodeship =

Ruszków
- Village
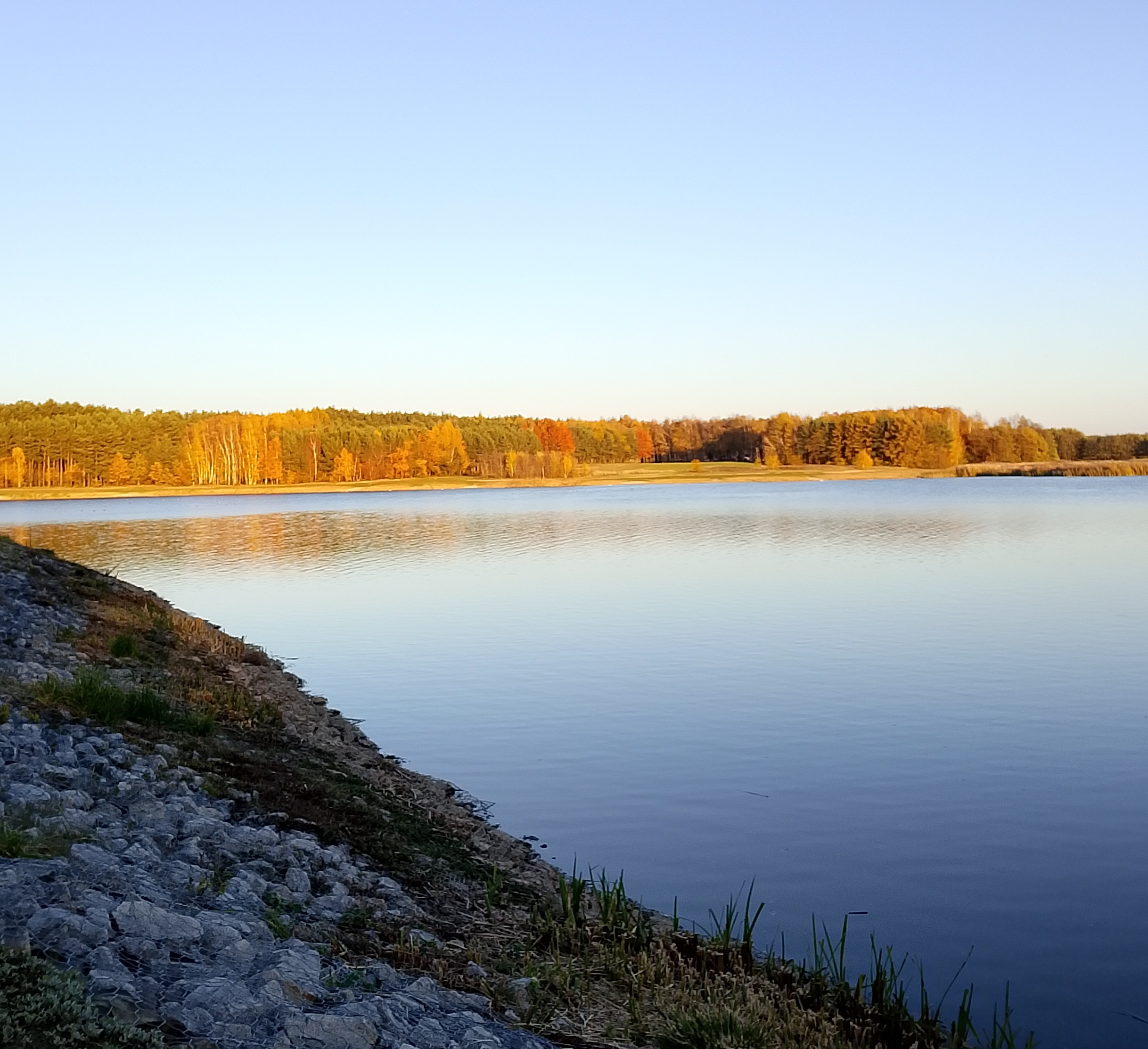

- Location within Poland
- Coordinates: 51°29′50″N 18°40′13″E
- Country: Poland
- Voivodeship: Łódź
- County: Sieradz
- Gmina: Brzeźnio

Ruszków [ˈruʂkuf] is a village in the administrative district of Gmina Brzeźnio, within Sieradz County, Łódź Voivodeship, in central Poland.
