= Klonowa, Łódź Voivodeship =

Klonowa
- Village
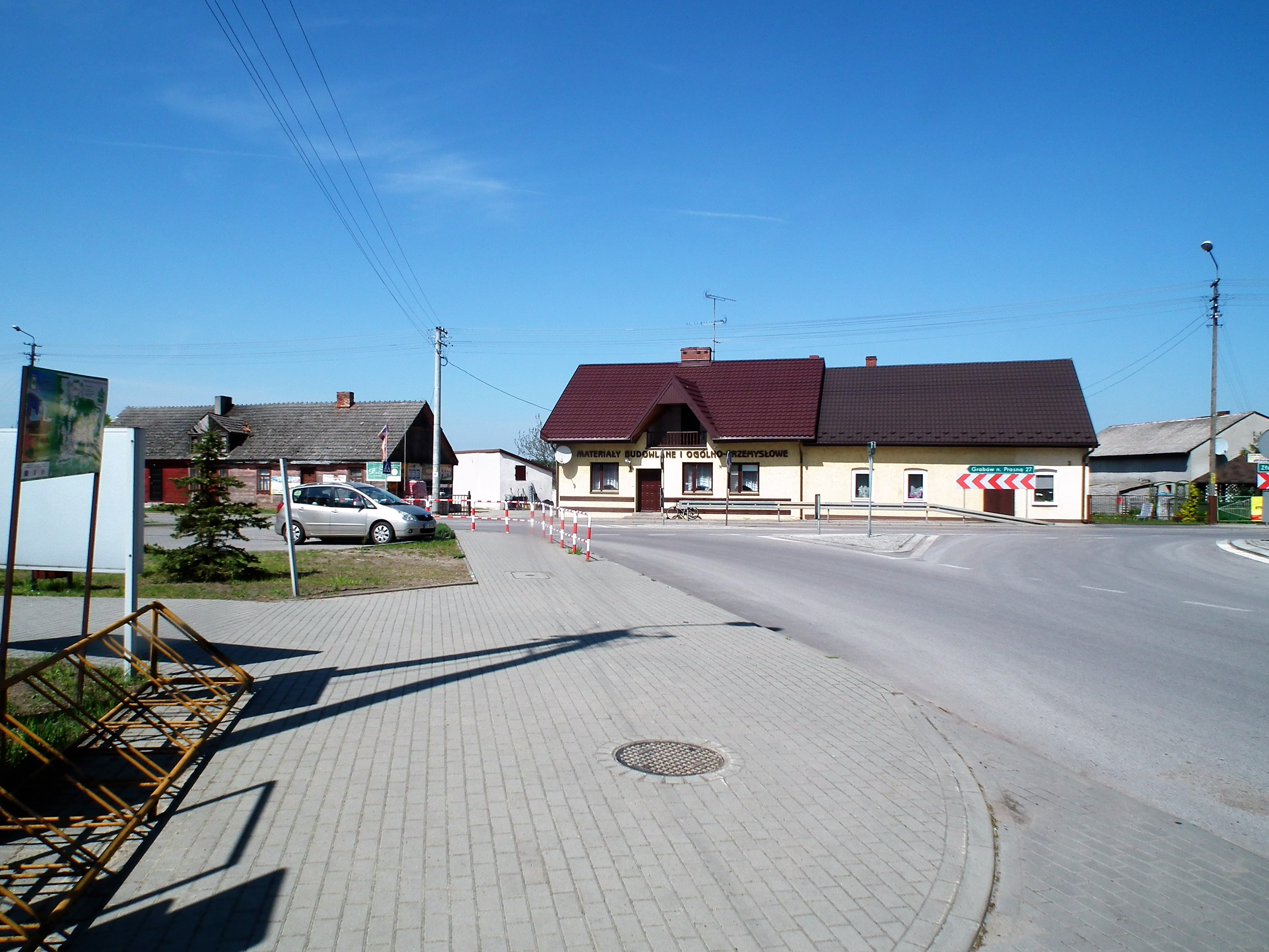

- Location within Poland
- Coordinates: 51°25′9″N 18°25′3″E
- Country: Poland
- Voivodeship: Łódź
- County: Sieradz
- Gmina: Klonowa
- Population: 950

Klonowa [klɔˈnɔva] is a village in Sieradz County, Łódź Voivodeship, in central Poland. It is the seat of the gmina (administrative district) called Gmina Klonowa.
