= Owieczki, Łódź Voivodeship =

Owieczki
- Village
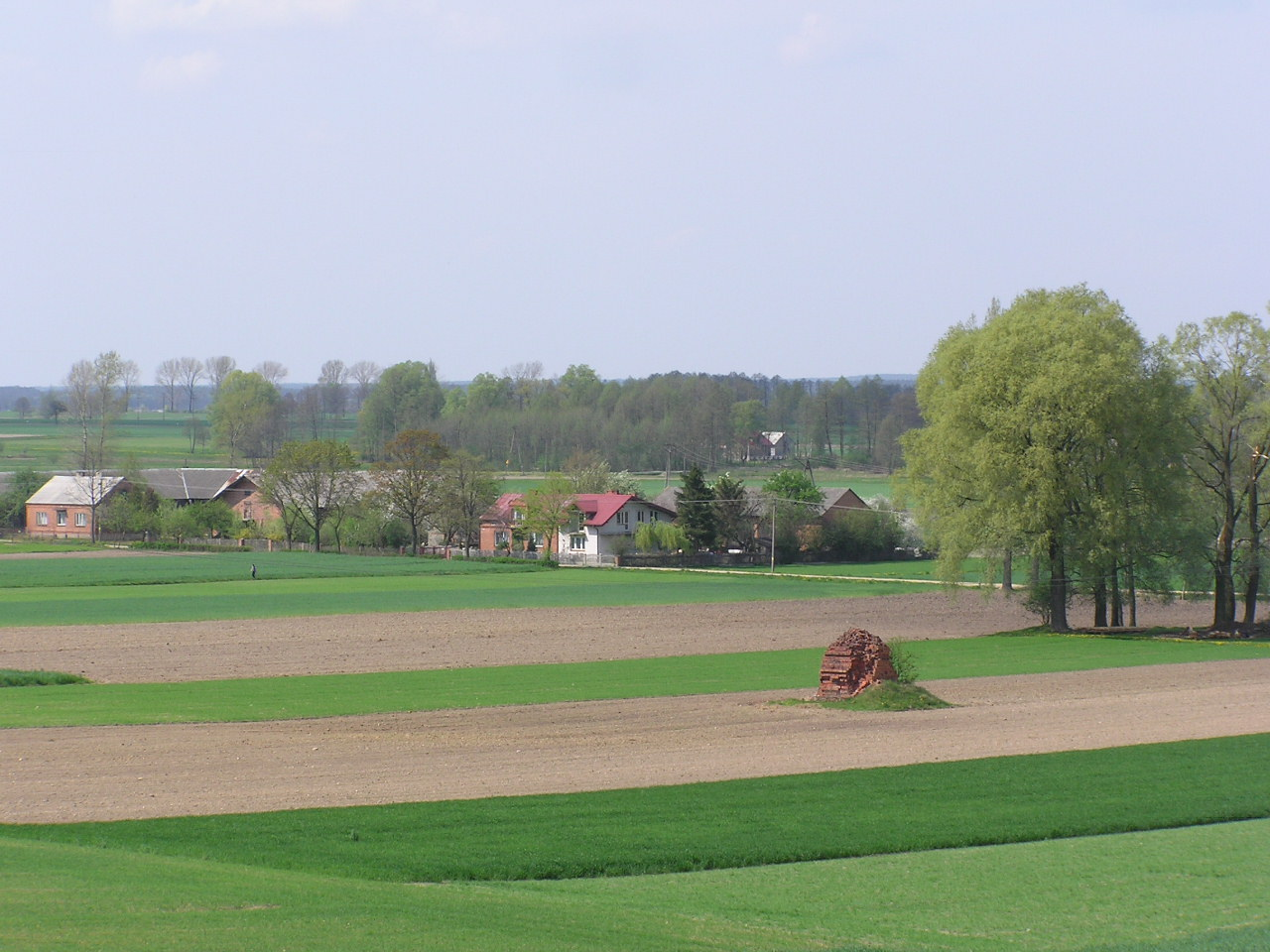

- Location within Poland
- Coordinates: 51°24′N 18°28′E
- Country: Poland
- Voivodeship: Łódź
- County: Sieradz
- Gmina: Klonowa
- Population (approx.): 450

Owieczki [ɔˈvjɛt͡ʂki] is a village in the administrative district of Gmina Klonowa, within Sieradz County, Łódź Voivodeship, in central Poland.

The village has an approximate population of 450.
