= Brąszewice =

- Village
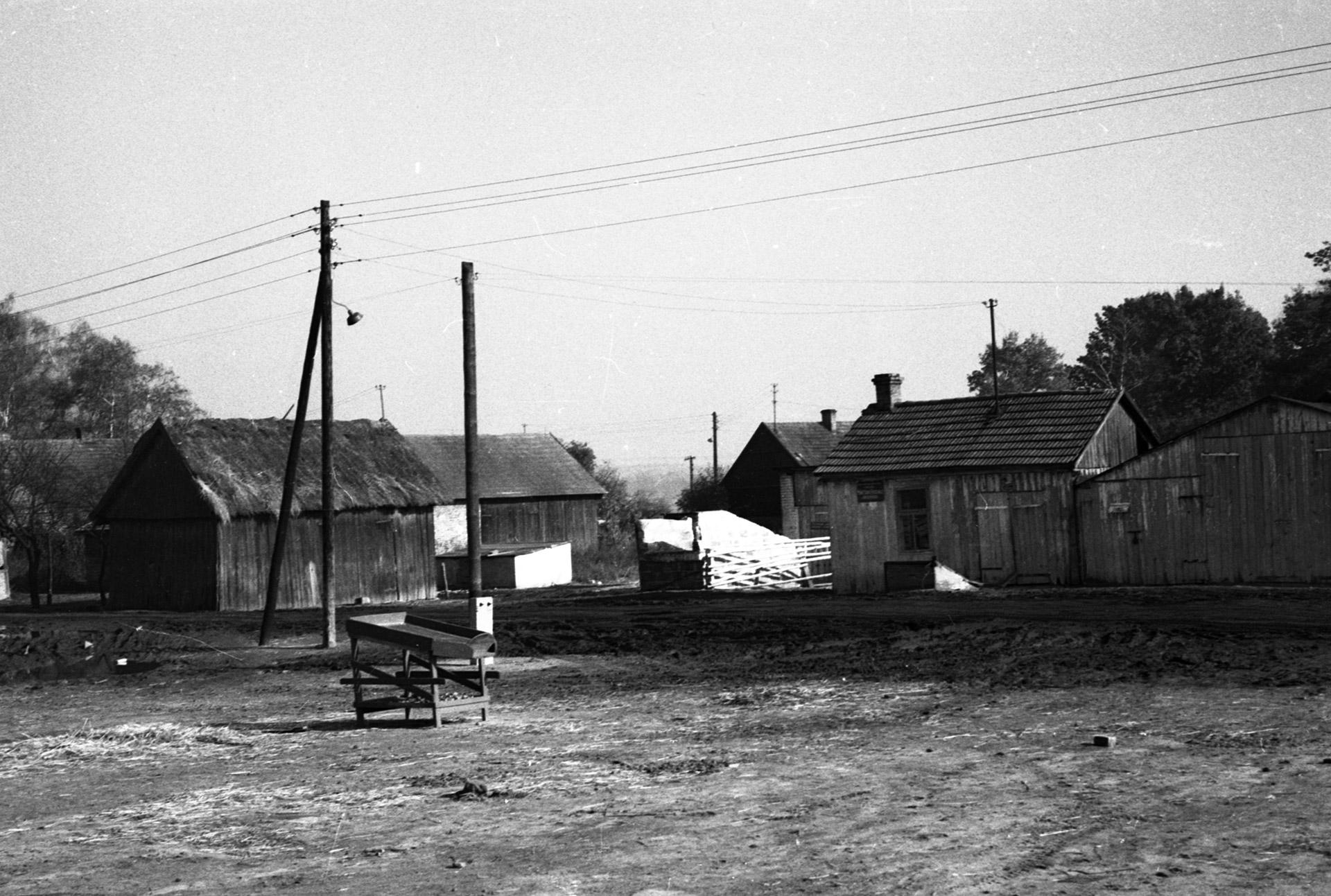

- Location within Poland
- Coordinates: 51°29′53″N 18°26′59″E
- Country: Poland
- Voivodeship: Łódź
- County: Sieradz
- Gmina: Brąszewice
- Population: 1,100

Brąszewice [brɔ̃ʂɛˈvit͡sɛ] is a village in Sieradz County, Łódź Voivodeship, in central Poland. It is the seat of the gmina (administrative district) called Gmina Brąszewice.
