= Zwierzyniec, Łódź Voivodeship =

Zwierzyniec
- Village
- Location within Poland
- Coordinates: 51°29′20″N 18°31′55″E
- Country: Poland
- Voivodeship: Łódź
- County: Sieradz
- Gmina: Brąszewice

Zwierzyniec (Polish pronunciation: [zvjɛˈʐɨɲɛt͡s]) is a village in the administrative district of Gmina Brąszewice, within Sieradz County, Łódź Voivodeship, in central Poland.
