= Gmina Brąszewice =

Gmina Brąszewice Brąszewice Commune
- Gmina
- Flag Coat of arms
- Interactive map of Gmina Brąszewice
- Coordinates (Brąszewice): 51°29′53″N 18°26′59″E
- Country: Poland
- Voivodeship: Łódź
- County: Sieradz
- Seat: Brąszewice

Area
  - Total: 106.33 km^{2} (41.05 sq mi)

Population (2006)
  - Total: 4,485
  - Density: 42.18/km^{2} (109.2/sq mi)
- Car plates: ESI
- Website: www.braszewice.pl

Gmina Brąszewice is a rural gmina (administrative district) in Sieradz County, Łódź Voivodeship, in central Poland. Its seat is the village of Brąszewice, which lies approximately 24 kilometres (15 mi) south-west of Sieradz and 78 km (48 mi) south-west of the regional capital Łódź.

The gmina covers an area of 106.33 square kilometres (41.1 sq mi), and as of 2006 its total population is 4,485.

== Villages ==
Gmina Brąszewice contains the villages and settlements of:

- Błota
- Brąszewice
- Bukowiec
- Chajew
- Chajew-Kolonia
- Czartoryja
- Gałki
- Godynice
- Kamieniki
- Kosatka
- Lisy
- Sokolenie
- Starce
- Trzcinka
- Wiertelaki
- Wojtyszki
- Wólka Klonowska
- Zadębieniec
- Żuraw
- Zwierzyniec

== Neighbouring gminas ==
Gmina Brąszewice is bordered by the gminas of Błaszki, Brzeziny, Brzeźnio, Czajków, Klonowa, Wróblew and Złoczew.
