= Gmina Brzeźnio =

Gmina Brzeźnio Brzeźnio Commune
- Gmina
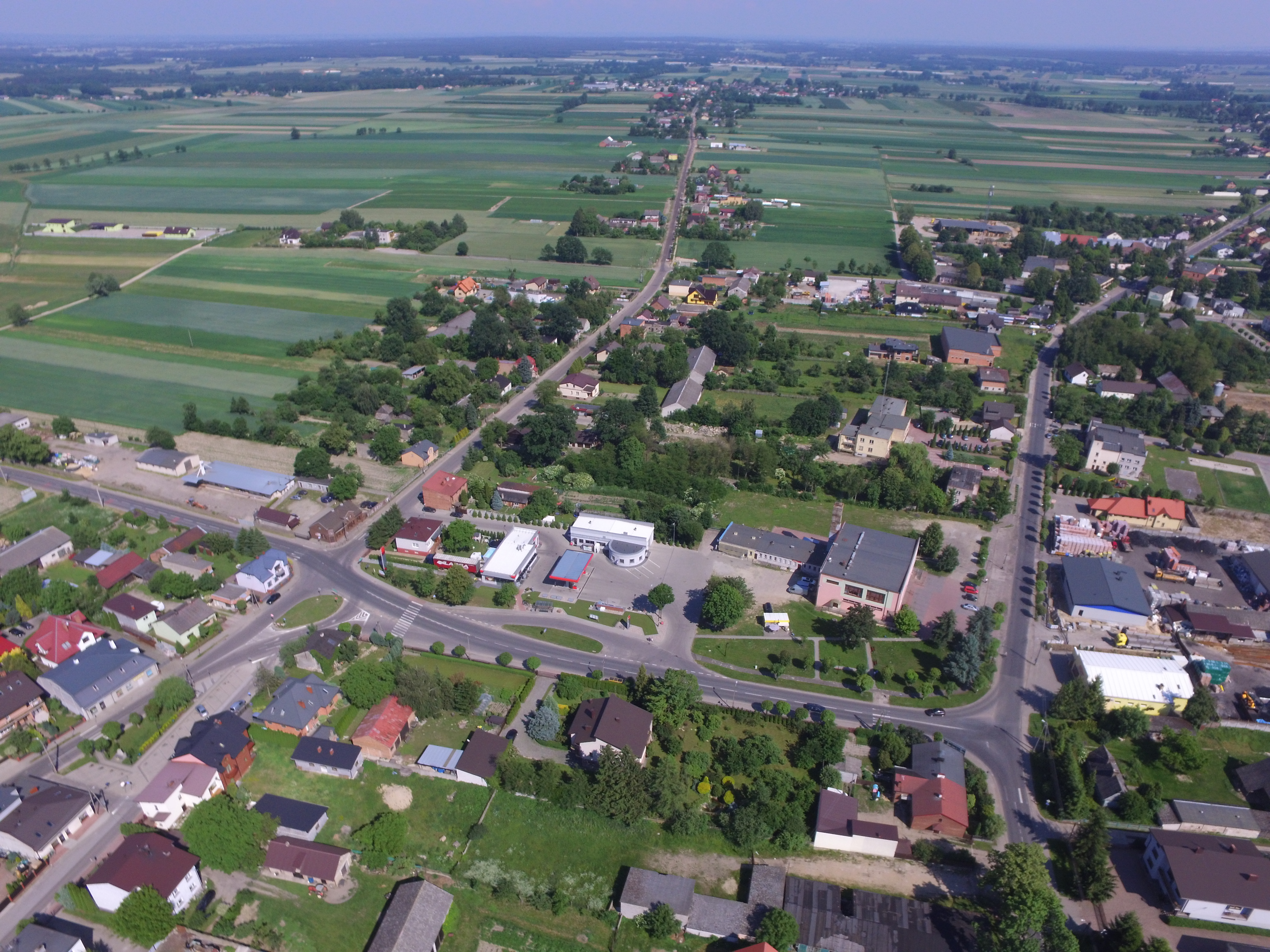

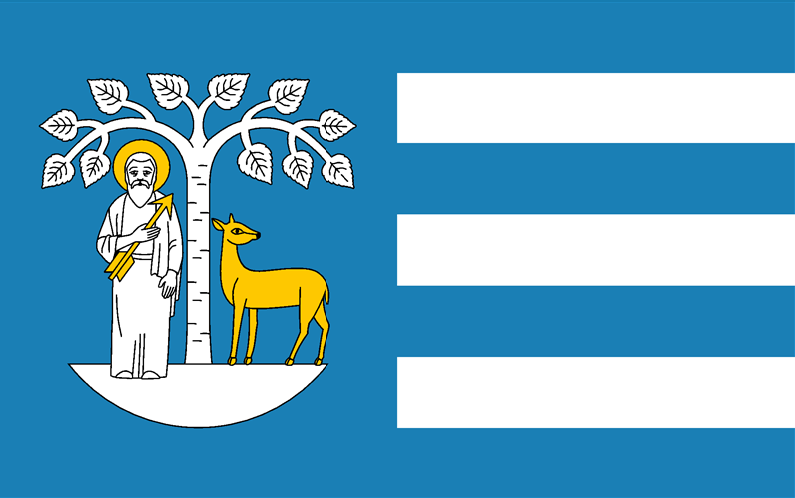
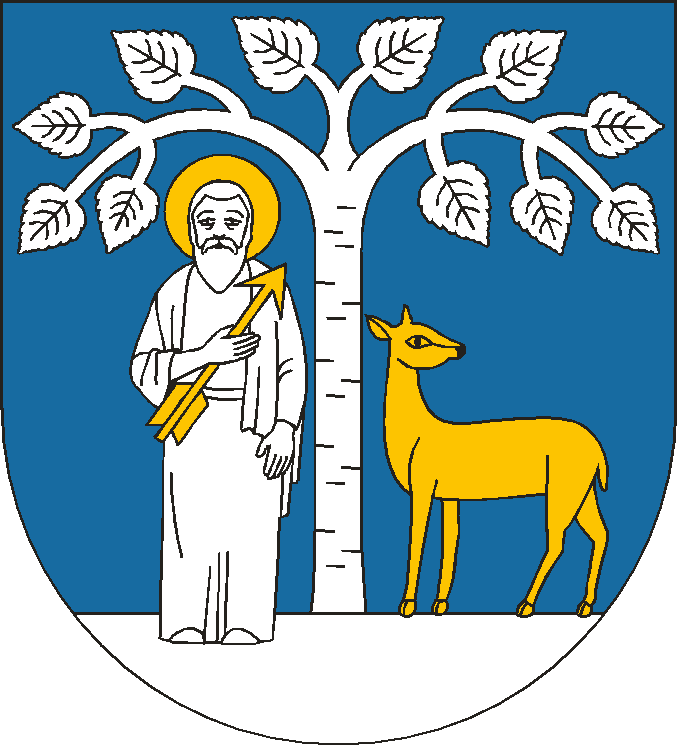
- Flag Coat of arms
- Interactive map of Gmina Brzeźnio
- Coordinates (Brzeźnio): 51°29′41″N 18°37′19″E
- Country: Poland
- Voivodeship: Łódź
- County: Sieradz
- Seat: Brzeźnio

Area
  - Total: 128.73 km^{2} (49.70 sq mi)

Population (2006)
  - Total: 6,351
  - Density: 49.34/km^{2} (127.8/sq mi)
- Car plates: ESI
- Website: www.brzeznio.pl

Gmina Brzeźnio is a rural gmina (administrative district) in Sieradz County, Łódź Voivodeship, in central Poland. Its seat is the village of Brzeźnio, which lies approximately 15 kilometres (9 mi) south-west of Sieradz and 67 km (42 mi) south-west of the regional capital Łódź.

The gmina covers an area of 128.73 square kilometres (49.7 sq mi), and as of 2006 its total population is 6,351.

== Villages ==
Gmina Brzeźnio contains the villages and settlements of:

- Barczew
- Borowiska
- Bronisławów
- Brzeźnio
- Dębołęka
- Gęsina
- Gozdy
- Kliczków Mały
- Kliczków Wielki
- Kliczków-Kolonia
- Krzaki
- Lipno
- Nowa Wieś
- Ostrów
- Podcabaje
- Próba
- Pustelnik
- Pyszków
- Rembów
- Ruszków
- Rybnik
- Rydzew
- Stefanów Barczewski Drugi
- Stefanów Barczewski Pierwszy
- Stefanów Ruszkowski
- Wierzbowa
- Wola Brzeźniowska
- Zapole
- Złotowizna

== Neighbouring gminas ==
Gmina Brzeźnio is bordered by the gminas of Brąszewice, Burzenin, Sieradz, Wróblew and Złoczew.
