= Świątki, Łódź Voivodeship =

Świątki
- Village
- Location within Poland
- Coordinates: 51°26′27″N 18°23′39″E
- Country: Poland
- Voivodeship: Łódź
- County: Sieradz
- Gmina: Klonowa

Świątki (Polish pronunciation: [ˈɕfjɔntkʲi]) is a small village in the administrative district of Gmina Klonowa, within Sieradz County, Łódź Voivodeship, in central Poland.
