= Rybník =

Rybník may refer to places:

== Czech Republic ==
- Rybník (Domažlice District), a municipality and village in the Plzeň Region
- Rybník (Ústí nad Orlicí District), a municipality and village in the Pardubice Region
- Rybník, a village and part of Dolní Dvořiště in the South Bohemian Region

== Slovakia ==
- Rybník, Levice District, a municipality and village in the Nitra Region
- Rybník, Revúca District, a municipality and village in the Banská Bystrica Region

== See also ==
- Rybnik (disambiguation)
- Rybníček (disambiguation)
- Rybníky (disambiguation)
