= Stolec, Łódź Voivodeship =

Stolec
- Village
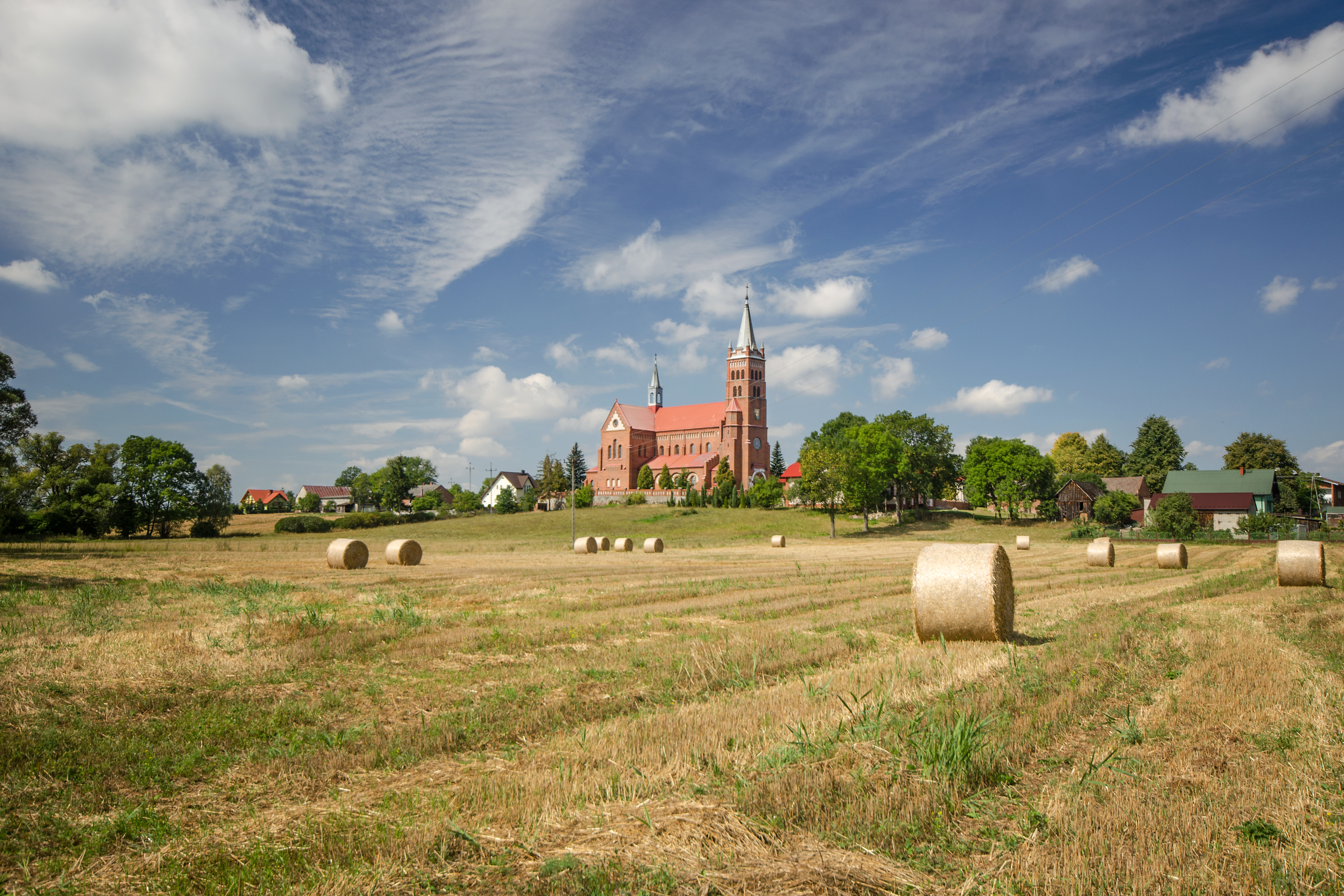

- Location within Poland
- Coordinates: 51°22′9″N 18°41′29″E
- Country: Poland
- Voivodeship: Łódź
- County: Sieradz
- Gmina: Złoczew
- Population: 440

Stolec ([ˈstɔlɛt͡s]) is a village in the administrative district of Gmina Złoczew, within Sieradz County, Łódź Voivodeship, in central Poland.
