= Szklana Huta, Łódź Voivodeship =

Szklana Huta
- Village
- Location within Poland
- Coordinates: 51°25′14″N 18°38′54″E
- Country: Poland
- Voivodeship: Łódź
- County: Sieradz
- Gmina: Złoczew

Szklana Huta [ˈʂklana ˈxuta] is a village in the administrative district of Gmina Złoczew, within Sieradz County, Łódź Voivodeship, in central Poland.
