= Pustelnik, Łódź Voivodeship =

Pustelnik
- Village
- Location within Poland
- Coordinates: 51°30′52″N 18°37′16″E
- Country: Poland
- Voivodeship: Łódź
- County: Sieradz
- Gmina: Brzeźnio
- Population: 120

Pustelnik [pusˈtɛlɲik] is a village in the administrative district of Gmina Brzeźnio, within Sieradz County, Łódź Voivodeship, in central Poland.
