= Rybníček (Havlíčkův Brod District) =

- Municipality
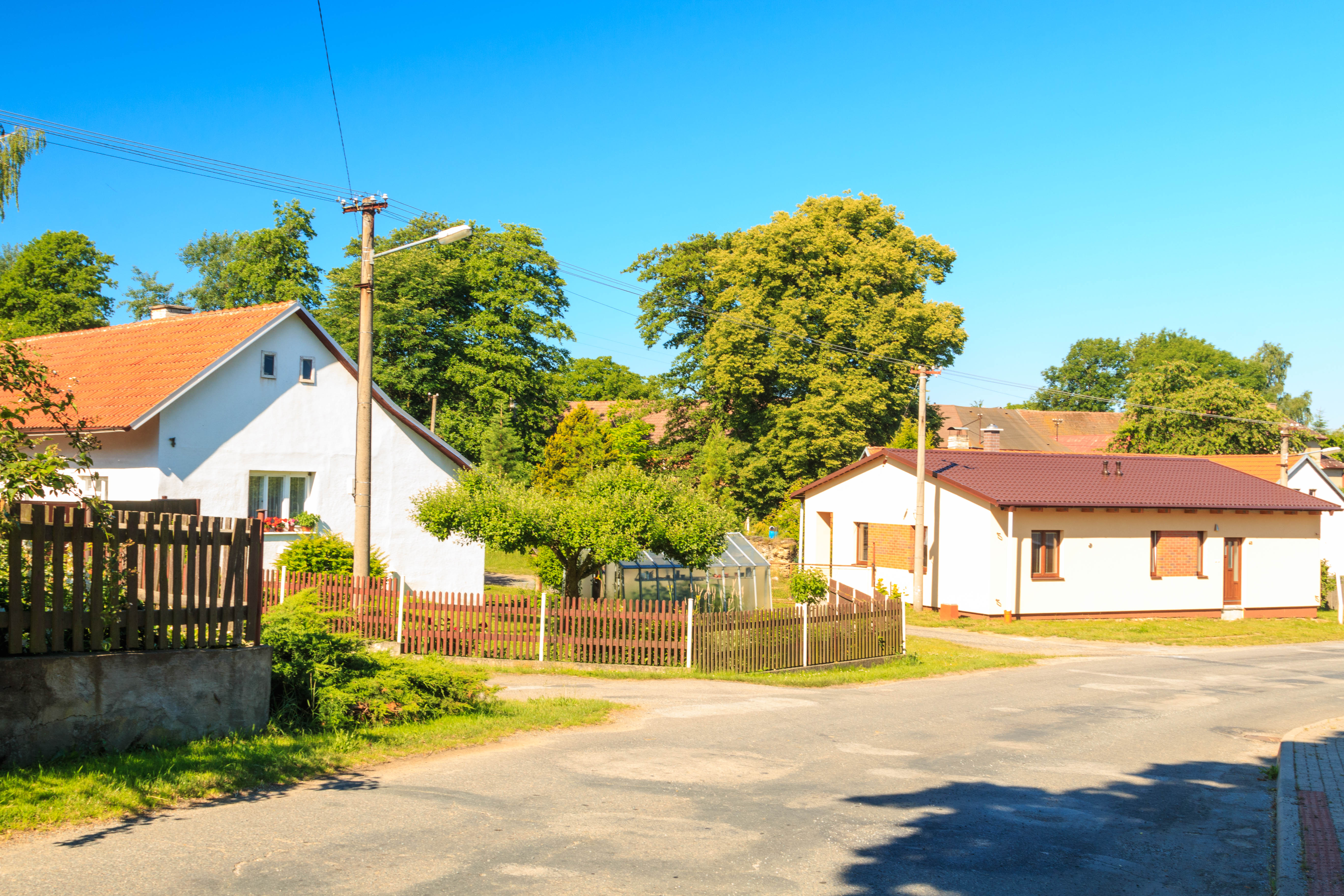
- Houses in the centre of Rybníček

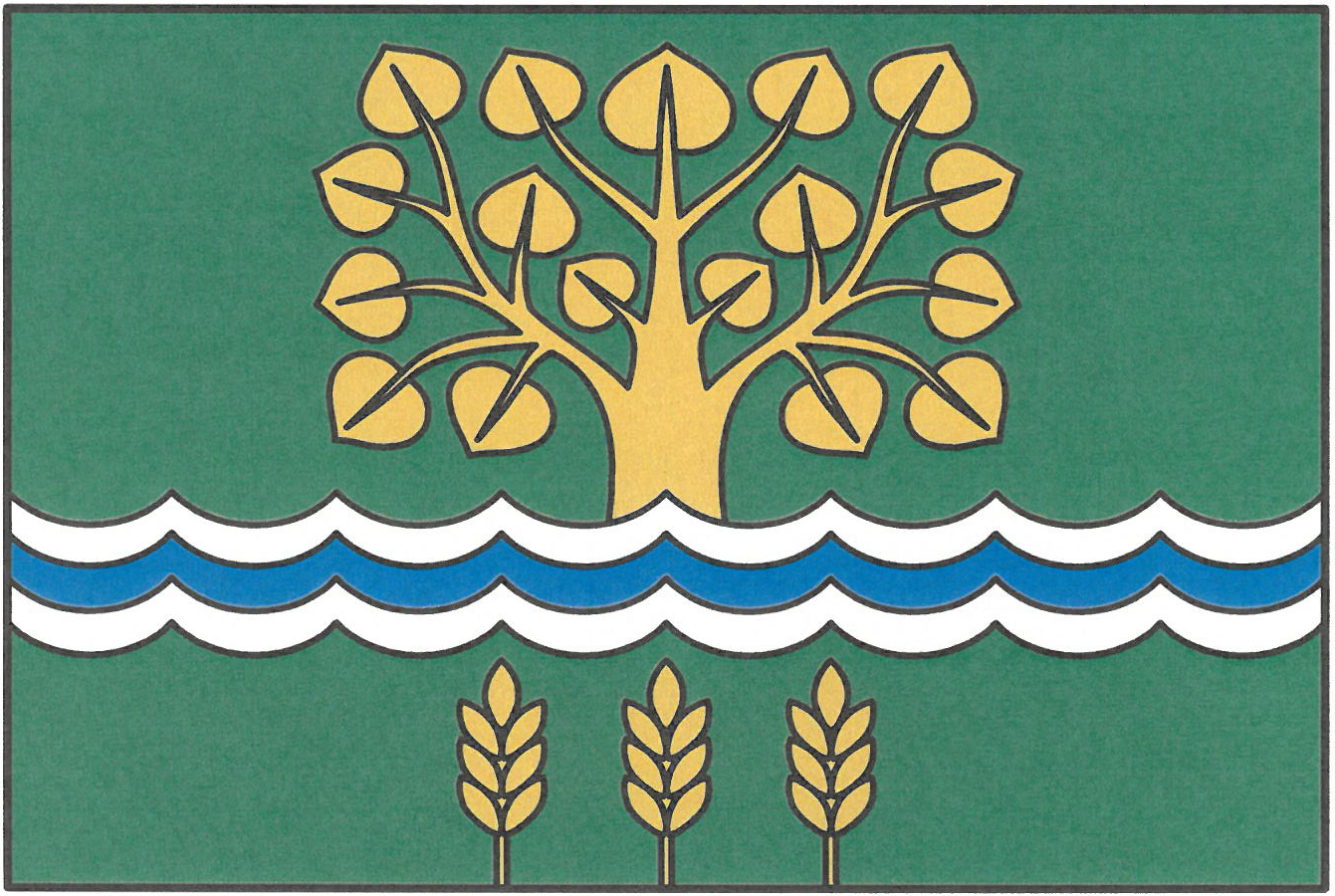
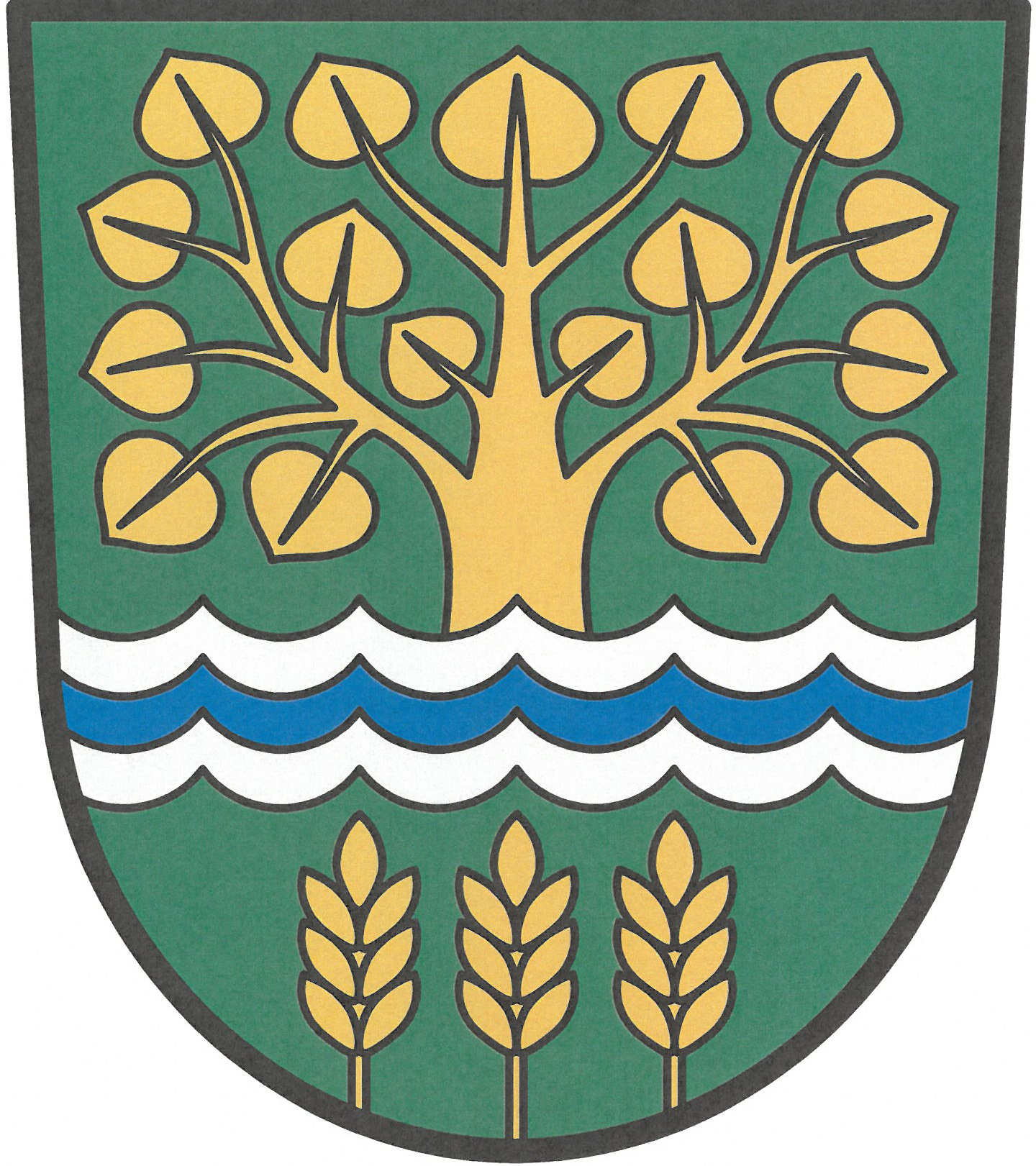
- Flag Coat of arms

- Location in the Czech Republic
- Coordinates: 49°46′10″N 15°30′33″E
- Country: Czech Republic
- Region: Vysočina
- District: Havlíčkův Brod
- First mentioned: 1552

Area
  - Total: 3.61 km^{2} (1.39 sq mi)
- Elevation: 479 m (1,572 ft)

Population (2026-01-01)
  - Total: 77
  - Density: 21/km^{2} (55/sq mi)
- Time zone: UTC+1 (CET)
  - Summer (DST): UTC+2 (CEST)
- Postal code: 582 82
- Website: www.obecrybnicek.cz

Rybníček is a municipality and village in Havlíčkův Brod District in the Vysočina Region of the Czech Republic. It has about 80 inhabitants.

Rybníček lies approximately 19 kilometres (12 mi) north of Havlíčkův Brod, 42 km (26 mi) north of Jihlava, and 86 km (53 mi) south-east of Prague.

== Demographics ==
Historical population
Year	Pop.	±%
1869	233	—
1880	238	+2.1%
1890	185	−22.3%
1900	168	−9.2%
1910	193	+14.9%
1921	212	+9.8%
1930	193	−9.0%
1950	126	−34.7%
1961	109	−13.5%
1970	109	+0.0%
1980	114	+4.6%
1991	73	−36.0%
2001	68	−6.8%
2011	55	−19.1%
2021	69	+25.5%
Source: Censuses
