= Gmina Złoczew =

Gmina Złoczew Złoczew Commune
- Gmina

- Coat of arms

- Location within Łódź Voivodeship Location within Poland
- Coordinates (Złoczew): 51°24′53″N 18°36′26″E
- Country: Poland
- Voivodeship: Łódź
- County: Sieradz
- Seat: Złoczew

Area
  - Total: 118.02 km^{2} (45.57 sq mi)

Population (2006)
  - Total: 7,398
  - Density: 62.68/km^{2} (162.4/sq mi)
  - Urban: 3,403
  - Rural: 3,995
- Car plates: ESI
- Website: www.zloczew.bazagmin.pl

Gmina Złoczew is an urban-rural gmina (administrative district) in Sieradz County, Łódź Voivodeship, in central Poland. Its seat is the town of Złoczew, which lies approximately 23 kilometres (14 mi) south-west of Sieradz and 73 km (45 mi) south-west of the regional capital Łódź.

The gmina covers an area of 118.02 square kilometres (45.6 sq mi), and as of 2006 its total population is 7,398 (out of which the population of Złoczew amounts to 3,403, and the population of the rural part of the gmina is 3,995).

== Villages ==
Apart from the town of Złoczew, Gmina Złoczew contains the villages and settlements of:

- Andrzejówka
- Biesiec
- Borzęckie
- Broszki
- Broszki-Kolonia
- Bujnów
- Bujnów-Kolonia
- Burdynówka
- Czarna
- Dąbrowa Miętka
- Doliny
- Emilianów
- Filipole
- Galbierka
- Glina
- Górki
- Grójec Mały
- Grójec Wielki
- Grójec Wielki-Gajówka
- Grójec Wielki-Leśniczówka
- Gronówek
- Jaryszek
- Jaźwiny
- Jeże
- Kamasówka
- Kamasze
- Kita
- Koźliny
- Kresy
- Krzyżanka
- Łagiewniki
- Łeszczyn
- Lipiny
- Ługi
- Miklesz
- Miklesz-Kolonia
- Młyn
- Napłatek
- Niwa
- Obojęcie
- Pieczyska
- Pogony
- Pokarczemna
- Pokowalska
- Potok
- Prusaki
- Przerwa
- Przylepka
- Robaszew
- Serwitut (sołectwo Czarna)
- Serwitut (sołectwo Stolec)
- Siekanie
- Stanisławów
- Stara Wieś
- Stolec
- Stolec Poduchowny
- Struga
- Szklana Huta
- Szlachecka
- Uników
- Uników Poduchowny
- Uników-Kolonia
- Wandalin
- Wandalin nad Szosą
- Wilkołek Grójecki
- Wilkołek Unikowski
- Zapowiednik
- Zawiatraki

== Neighbouring gminas ==
Gmina Złoczew is bordered by the gminas of Brąszewice, Brzeźnio, Burzenin, Klonowa, Konopnica, Lututów and Ostrówek.
