= Brzeźnio =

- Village
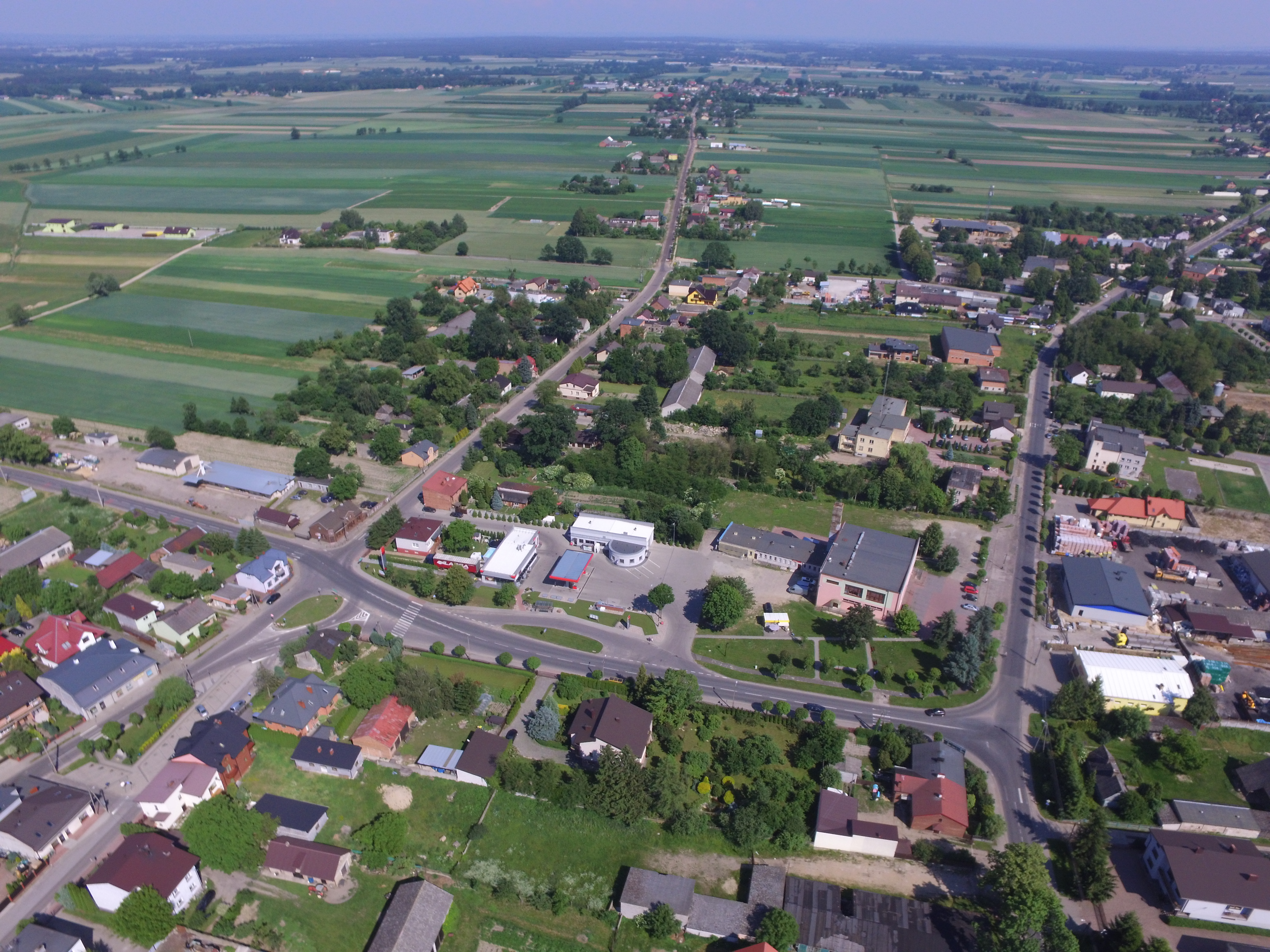
- Aerial view

- Location within Poland
- Coordinates: 51°29′41″N 18°37′19″E
- Country: Poland
- Voivodeship: Łódź
- County: Sieradz
- Gmina: Brzeźnio
- Elevation: 166 m (545 ft)

Population
  - Total: 1,150
- Website: http://www.brzeznio.finn.pl

Brzeźnio [ˈbʐɛʑɲɔ] is a village in Sieradz County, Łódź Voivodeship, in central Poland. It is the seat of the gmina (administrative district) called Gmina Brzeźnio.
