= Sieradz County =

Sieradz County Powiat sieradzki
- County
- Flag Coat of arms

- Location within the voivodeship
- Coordinates (Sieradz): 51°36′N 18°45′E
- Country: Poland
- Voivodeship: Łódź
- Seat: Sieradz
- Gminas: Total 11 (incl. 1 urban): Sieradz; Gmina Błaszki; Gmina Brąszewice; Gmina Brzeźnio; Gmina Burzenin; Gmina Goszczanów; Gmina Klonowa; Gmina Sieradz; Gmina Warta; Gmina Wróblew; Gmina Złoczew

Area
  - Total: 1,491.04 km^{2} (575.69 sq mi)

Population (2006)
  - Total: 121,013
  - Density: 81.1601/km^{2} (210.204/sq mi)
  - Urban: 53,015
  - Rural: 67,998
- Car plates: ESI
- Website: www.powiat-sieradz.pl

Sieradz County (Polish: powiat sieradzki) is a unit of territorial administration and local government (powiat) in Łódź Voivodeship, central Poland. It came into being on January 1, 1999, as a result of the Polish local government reforms passed in 1998. Its administrative seat and largest town is Sieradz, which lies 54 kilometres (34 mi) west of the regional capital Łódź. The county contains three other towns: Złoczew, lying 23 km (14 mi) south-west of Sieradz, Warta, lying 14 km (9 mi) north-west of Sieradz, and Błaszki, 23 km (14 mi) west of Sieradz.

The county covers an area of 1,491.04 square kilometres (575.7 sq mi). As of 2006 its total population is 121,013, out of which the population of Sieradz is 44,045, that of Złoczew is 3,403, that of Warta is 3,388, that of Błaszki is 2,179, and the rural population is 67,998.

== Neighbouring counties ==
Sieradz County is bordered by Turek County and Poddębice County to the north, Zduńska Wola County and Łask County to the east, Wieluń County to the south, Wieruszów County to the south-west, and Ostrzeszów County and Kalisz County to the west.

== Administrative divisions ==
The county is subdivided into 11 gminas (one urban, three urban-rural and seven rural). These are listed in the following table, in descending order of population.

| Gmina | Type | Area (km^{2}) | Population (2006) | Seat |
|---|---|---|---|---|
| Sieradz | urban | 51.2 | 44,045 | |
| Gmina Błaszki | urban-rural | 201.6 | 15,090 | Błaszki |
| Gmina Warta | urban-rural | 252.9 | 13,074 | Warta |
| Gmina Sieradz | rural | 181.6 | 9,788 | Sieradz * |
| Gmina Złoczew | urban-rural | 118.0 | 7,398 | Złoczew |
| Gmina Brzeźnio | rural | 128.7 | 6,351 | Brzeźnio |
| Gmina Wróblew | rural | 113.2 | 6,244 | Wróblew |
| Gmina Goszczanów | rural | 123.3 | 5,814 | Goszczanów |
| Gmina Burzenin | rural | 119.0 | 5,665 | Burzenin |
| Gmina Brąszewice | rural | 106.3 | 4,485 | Brąszewice |
| Gmina Klonowa | rural | 95.4 | 3,059 | Klonowa |
* seat not part of the gmina
