= List of German exonyms in the Kuyavian-Pomeranian Voivodeship =

This is a list of German language place names in Poland, now exonyms for towns and villages in the Kuyavian-Pomeranian Voivodeship.

Polish Name	Polish Powiat (County)	German Name
Aleksandrów Kujawski	Aleksandrów	Alexandrow (Weichsel), Weichselstädt
Brodnica	Brodnica	Strasburg in Westpreußen, Strasburg an der Drewenz
Brześć Kujawski	Włocławek	Brest, Kujawisch Brest
Bydgoszcz	Bydgoszcz	Bromberg
Bysław	Tuchola	Groß Bislaw
Bysławek	Tuchola	Klein Bislaw
Cekcyn	Tuchola	Polnisch Cekzin, Seehaupten
Chełmno	Chełmno	Culm, Kulm
Chełmża	Toruń	Culmsee, Kulmsee
Ciechocinek	Aleksandrów	Hermannsbad
Czernikowo	Toruń	Schwarzendorf
Dobrzyń	Golub-Dobrzyń	Dobrin an der Drewenz
Dobrzyń nad Wisłą	Lipno	Dobrin an der Weichsel
Dolna Grupa	Świecie	Nieder Gruppe
Gniewkowo	Inowrocław	Argenau
Golub	Golub-Dobrzyń	Gollub
Górna Grupa	Świecie	Ober Gruppe
Górzno	Brodnica	Görzberg
Grudziądz	Grudziądz	Graudenz
Inowrocław	Inowrocław	Inowrazlaw, Hohensalza, Jungleslau, Junges Leslau, Junge Leszlaw (also Lesle or Lessle in Yiddish)
Jabłonowo Pomorskie	Brodnica	Jablonowo, Goßlershausen
Kłonowo	Radziejów	Klönnau
Klonowo	Tuchola	Klonowo, Klontal
Koronowo	Bydgoszcz	Polnisch Krone, Krone an der Brahe
Kowalewo Pomorskie	Golub-Dobrzyń	Schönsee (Kreis Briesen)
Łasin	Grudziądz	Lessen
Legbąd	Tuchola	Legbond, Legbad
Lipno	Lipno	Leipe
Lubiewo	Tuchola	Lobfelde
Łysomice	Toruń	Lissomitz, Posemsdorf
Mrocza	Nakło	Mrotschen, Schönhausen, Immenheim
Nakło nad Notecią	Nakło	Nakel an der Netze
Nieszawa	Aleksandrów	Nessau
Nowe	Świecie	Neuenburg in Westpreußen, Neuenburg (Weichsel)
Pruszcz	Świecie	Prust
Radziejów	Radziejów	Rädichau
Radzyń Chełmiński	Grudziądz	Rehden
Rypin	Rypin	Rippin
Sępólno Krajeńskie	Sępólno	Zempelburg
Skępe	Lipno	Schemmensee
Solec Kujawski	Bydgoszcz	Schulitz
Świecie	Świecie	Schwetz an der Weichsel
Toruń	Toruń	Thorn
Tuchola	Tuchola	Tuchel
Unisław	Chełmno	Unislaw, Kulmischwenzlau
Wąbrzeźno	Wąbrzeźno	Briesen
Więcbork	Sępólno	Vandsburg
Włocławek	Włocławek	Leslau, Alt Lesle
Żnin	Żnin	Znin, Dietfurt

== See also ==
List of German exonyms for places in Poland
