= Lisiny =

Lisiny may refer to the following places:

- Lisiny, Gmina Cekcyn in Kuyavian-Pomeranian Voivodeship (north-central Poland)
- Lisiny, Gmina Śliwice in Kuyavian-Pomeranian Voivodeship (north-central Poland)
- Lisiny, Rypin County in Kuyavian-Pomeranian Voivodeship (north-central Poland)
- Lisiny, Masovian Voivodeship (east-central Poland)
- Lisiny, Warmian-Masurian Voivodeship (north Poland)
