= Gołąbek =

Gołąbek or Golabek may refer to:

- Gołąbek, Kuyavian-Pomeranian Voivodeship, Poland
- Gołąbek, Masovian Voivodeship, Poland

== See also ==
- Gołąbki
- Golabek (surname)
