= Linówek, Kuyavian-Pomeranian Voivodeship =

Linówek
- Village
- Location within Poland
- Coordinates: 53°43′40″N 18°13′31″E
- Country: Poland
- Voivodeship: Kuyavian-Pomeranian
- County: Tuchola
- Gmina: Śliwice
- Population: 130

Linówek [liˈnuvɛk] is a village in the administrative district of Gmina Śliwice, within Tuchola County, Kuyavian-Pomeranian Voivodeship, in north-central Poland.
