= Lubińsk =

- Colony
- Location within Poland
- Coordinates: 53°33′47″N 18°3′17″E
- Country: Poland
- Voivodeship: Kuyavian-Pomeranian
- County: Tuchola
- Gmina: Cekcyn
- Population: 100

Lubińsk [ˈlubiɲsk] is a colony in the administrative district of Gmina Cekcyn, within Tuchola County, Kuyavian-Pomeranian Voivodeship, in north-central Poland.
