= Zielonka, Gmina Cekcyn =

Zielonka
- Village
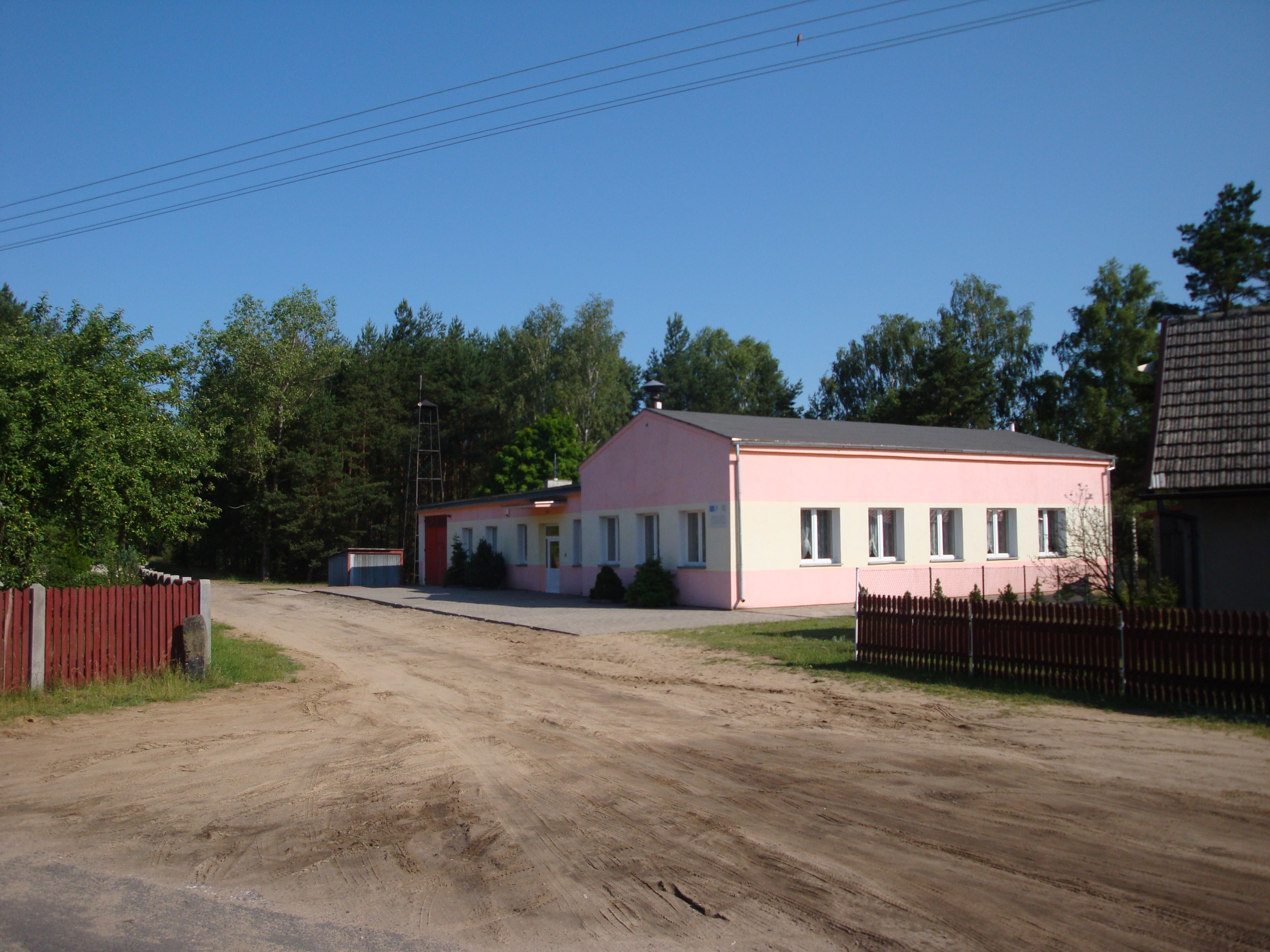
- Fire Station in Zielonka

- Location within Poland
- Coordinates: 53°34′58″N 18°7′46″E
- Country: Poland
- Voivodeship: Kuyavian-Pomeranian
- County: Tuchola
- Gmina: Cekcyn
- Population: 330

Zielonka [ʑɛˈlɔŋka] is a village in the administrative district of Gmina Cekcyn, within Tuchola County, Kuyavian-Pomeranian Voivodeship, in north-central Poland.
