= Wysoka, Gmina Cekcyn =

Wysoka
- Village
- Location within Poland
- Coordinates: 53°32′27″N 18°06′09″E
- Country: Poland
- Voivodeship: Kuyavian-Pomeranian
- County: Tuchola
- Gmina: Cekcyn
- Population: 300

Wysoka [vɨˈsɔka] is a village in the administrative district of Gmina Cekcyn, within Tuchola County, Kuyavian-Pomeranian Voivodeship, in north-central Poland.
