= Lubiewice, Gmina Cekcyn =

Lubiewice
- Village
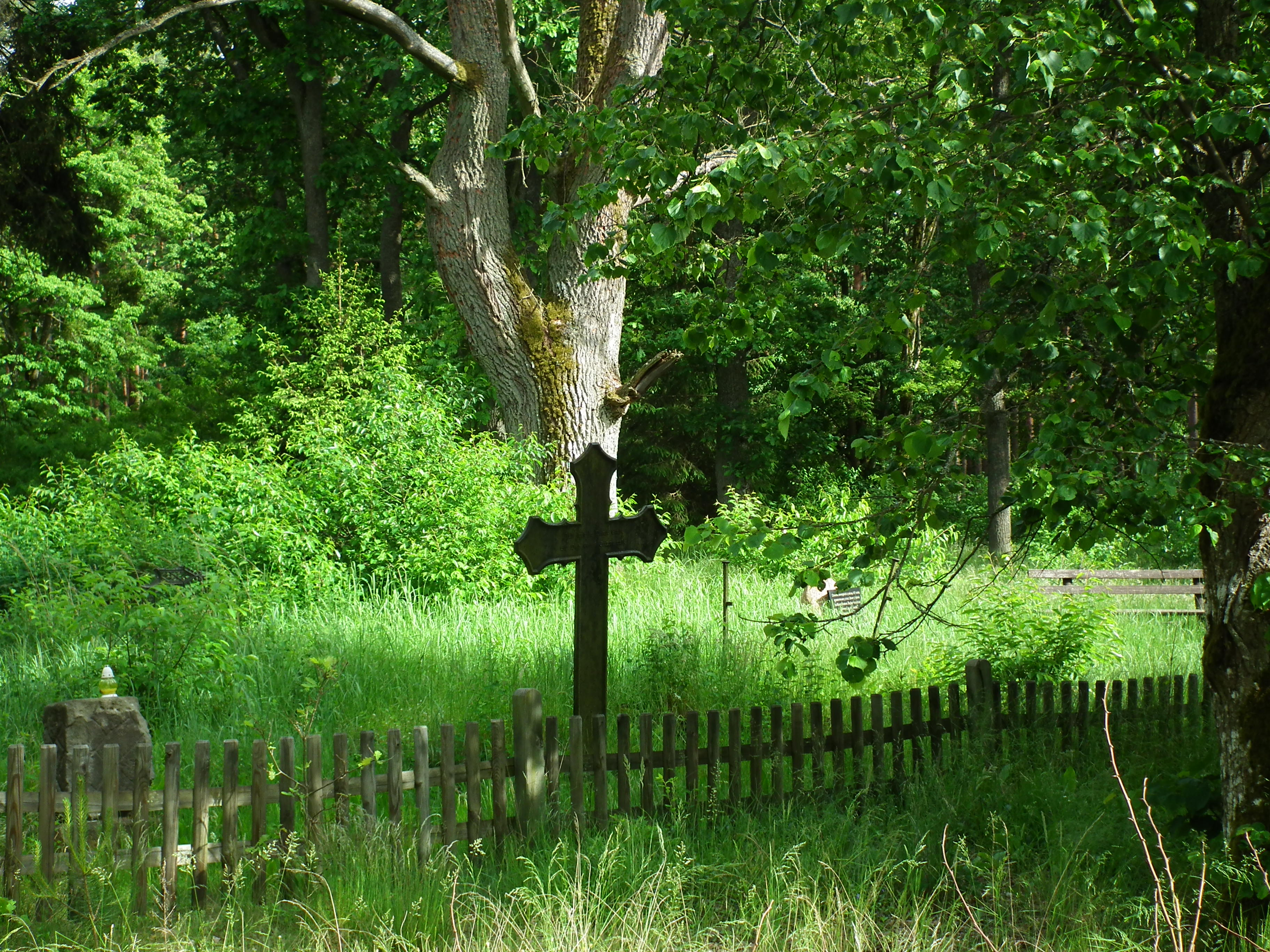
- Old evangelical cemetery in Lubiewice, commune Cekcyn.

- Location within Poland
- Coordinates: 53°31′03″N 18°05′18″E
- Country: Poland
- Voivodeship: Kuyavian-Pomeranian
- County: Tuchola
- Gmina: Cekcyn

Lubiewice [lubjɛˈvit͡sɛ] is a village in the administrative district of Gmina Cekcyn, within Tuchola County, Kuyavian-Pomeranian Voivodeship, in north-central Poland.
