= Śliwiczki =

Village in Kociewie

- Village
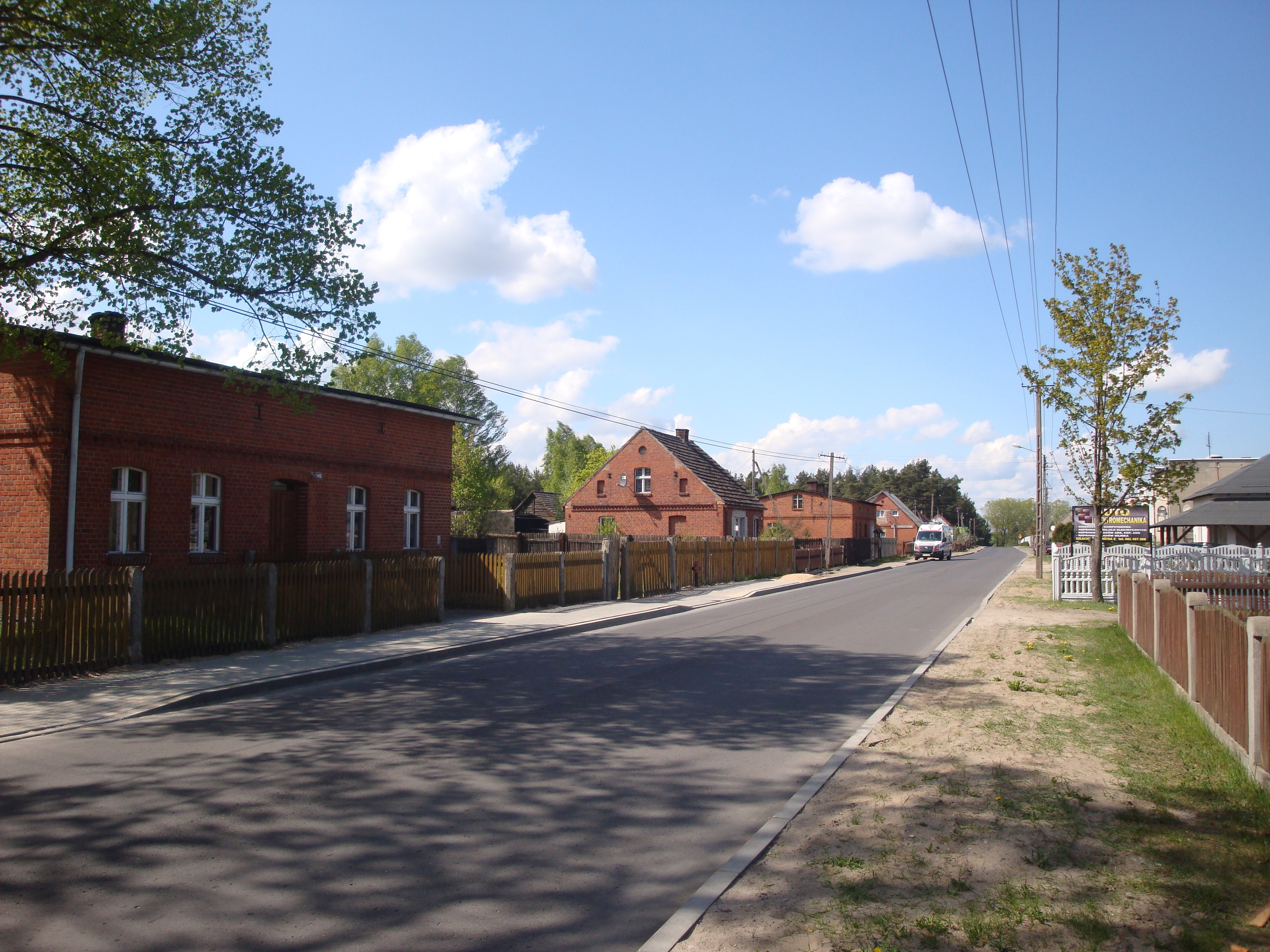

- Location within Poland
- Coordinates: 53°41′15″N 18°11′46″E
- Country: Poland
- Voivodeship: Kuyavian-Pomeranian
- County: Tuchola
- Gmina: Śliwice
- Population: 490

Śliwiczki [ɕliˈvit͡ʂki] is a village in the administrative district of Gmina Śliwice, within Tuchola County, Kuyavian-Pomeranian Voivodeship, in north-central Poland.

In 1942, the German occupiers changed the name of the village to Schliewitzhof . In 1975–1998, the town administratively belonged to the Bydgoszcz Province. There is a primary school in Śliwiczki.
