= Cekcynek =

- Village
- Location within Poland
- Coordinates: 53°34′18″N 17°59′11″E
- Country: Poland
- Voivodeship: Kuyavian-Pomeranian
- County: Tuchola
- Gmina: Cekcyn
- Population: 290

Cekcynek [t͡sɛkˈt͡sɨnɛk] is a village in the administrative district of Gmina Cekcyn, within Tuchola County, Kuyavian-Pomeranian Voivodeship, in north-central Poland.
