= Kruszka, Kuyavian-Pomeranian Voivodeship =

Kruszka
- Village
- Location within Poland
- Coordinates: 53°34′N 17°59′E
- Country: Poland
- Voivodeship: Kuyavian-Pomeranian
- County: Tuchola
- Gmina: Cekcyn
- Population: 170

Kruszka [ˈkruʂka] is a village in the administrative district of Gmina Cekcyn, within Tuchola County, Kuyavian-Pomeranian Voivodeship, in north-central Poland.
