= Sokole-Kuźnica, Gmina Lubiewo =

Sokole-Kuźnica
- Village
- Location within Poland
- Coordinates: 53°24′56″N 17°56′08″E
- Country: Poland
- Voivodeship: Kuyavian-Pomeranian
- County: Tuchola
- Gmina: Lubiewo
- Population: 6

Sokole-Kuźnica (Polish pronunciation: [sɔˈkɔlɛ kuʑˈɲit͡sa]) is a village in the administrative district of Gmina Lubiewo, within Tuchola County, Kuyavian-Pomeranian Voivodeship, in north-central Poland.
