= Zdroje, Tuchola County =

Village in Kociewie

Zdroje
- Village
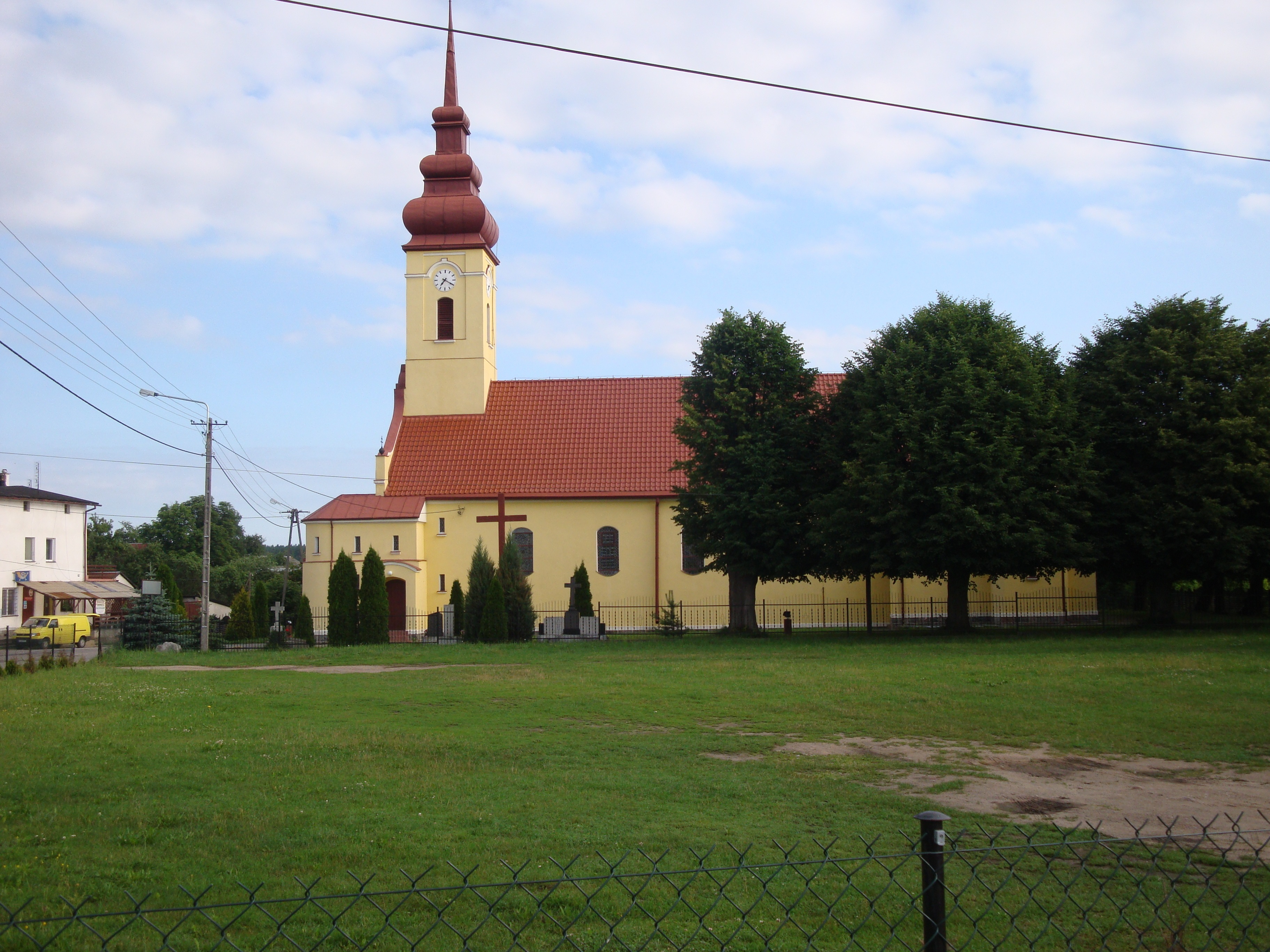
- Church in village

- Location within Poland
- Coordinates: 53°36′N 18°11′E
- Country: Poland
- Voivodeship: Kuyavian-Pomeranian
- County: Tuchola
- Gmina: Cekcyn
- Population: 300

Zdroje [ˈzdrɔjɛ] is a village in the administrative district of Gmina Cekcyn, within Tuchola County, Kuyavian-Pomeranian Voivodeship, in north-central Poland.
