= Zamarte, Tuchola County =

Zamarte
- Village
- Location within Poland
- Coordinates: 53°35′42″N 17°59′07″E
- Country: Poland
- Voivodeship: Kuyavian-Pomeranian
- County: Tuchola
- Gmina: Cekcyn
- Population: 100

Zamarte [zaˈmartɛ] is a village in the administrative district of Gmina Cekcyn, within Tuchola County, Kuyavian-Pomeranian Voivodeship, in north-central Poland.
