= Jelenia Góra (disambiguation) =

Jelenia Góra may refer to the following places:

- Jelenia Góra, Kuyavian-Pomeranian Voivodeship, village in Gmina Cekcyn, north-central Poland
- Jelenia Góra city in Lower Silesian Voivodeship, south-west Poland
- Jelenia Góra, Podlaskie Voivodeship, village in Gmina Sokółka, north-east Poland
