= Trutnowo, Kuyavian-Pomeranian Voivodeship =

Trutnowo
- Village
- Location within Poland
- Coordinates: 53°28′N 18°5′E
- Country: Poland
- Voivodeship: Kuyavian-Pomeranian
- County: Tuchola
- Gmina: Lubiewo
- Population: 210

Trutnowo [trutˈnɔvɔ] is a village in the administrative district of Gmina Lubiewo, within Tuchola County, Kuyavian-Pomeranian Voivodeship, in north-central Poland.
