= Bieszewo =

- Village
- Location within Poland
- Coordinates: 53°32′3″N 18°7′48″E
- Country: Poland
- Voivodeship: Kuyavian-Pomeranian
- County: Tuchola
- Gmina: Cekcyn
- Population: 50

Bieszewo [bjɛˈʂɛvɔ] is a village in the administrative district of Gmina Cekcyn, within Tuchola County, Kuyavian-Pomeranian Voivodeship, in north-central Poland.
