= Piła-Młyn =

- Village
- Location within Poland
- Coordinates: 53°30′54″N 17°53′26″E
- Country: Poland
- Voivodeship: Kuyavian-Pomeranian
- County: Tuchola
- Gmina: Cekcyn

Piła-Młyn [ˈpiwa ˈmwɨn] is a village in the administrative district of Gmina Cekcyn, within Tuchola County, Kuyavian-Pomeranian Voivodeship, in north-central Poland.
