= Okoniny =

- Village
- Location within Poland
- Coordinates: 53°40′51″N 18°4′17″E
- Country: Poland
- Voivodeship: Kuyavian-Pomeranian
- County: Tuchola
- Gmina: Śliwice
- Population: 90

Okoniny [ɔkɔˈninɨ] is a village in the administrative district of Gmina Śliwice, within Tuchola County, Kuyavian-Pomeranian Voivodeship, in north-central Poland.
