= Madera, Kuyavian-Pomeranian Voivodeship =

Madera
- Village
- Location within Poland
- Coordinates: 53°33′48″N 18°00′16″E
- Country: Poland
- Voivodeship: Kuyavian-Pomeranian
- County: Tuchola
- Gmina: Cekcyn

Madera [maˈdɛra] is a village in the administrative district of Gmina Cekcyn, within Tuchola County, Kuyavian-Pomeranian Voivodeship, in north-central Poland.
