= Lubiewice, Gmina Lubiewo =

Lubiewice
- Village
- Location within Poland
- Coordinates: 53°29′08″N 18°04′27″E
- Country: Poland
- Voivodeship: Kuyavian-Pomeranian
- County: Tuchola
- Gmina: Lubiewo
- Population: 240

Lubiewice [lubjɛˈvit͡sɛ] is a village in the administrative district of Gmina Lubiewo, within Tuchola County, Kuyavian-Pomeranian Voivodeship, in north-central Poland.
