= Plaskorz =

Plaskosz
- Village
- Location within Poland
- Coordinates: 53°35′24″N 17°55′29″E
- Country: Poland
- Voivodeship: Kuyavian-Pomeranian
- County: Tuchola
- Gmina: Cekcyn

Plaskosz [ˈplaskɔʂ] is a village in the administrative district of Gmina Cekcyn, within Tuchola County, Kuyavian-Pomeranian Voivodeship, in north-central Poland.
