= Łosiny, Gmina Cekcyn =

Łosiny
- Village
- Location within Poland
- Coordinates: 53°37′22″N 17°59′08″E
- Country: Poland
- Voivodeship: Kuyavian-Pomeranian
- County: Tuchola
- Gmina: Cekcyn

Łosiny [wɔˈɕinɨ] is a village in the administrative district of Gmina Cekcyn, within Tuchola County, Kuyavian-Pomeranian Voivodeship, in north-central Poland.
