= Sarnówek, Kuyavian-Pomeranian Voivodeship =

Sarnówek
- Village
- Location within Poland
- Coordinates: 53°32′54″N 18°07′56″E
- Country: Poland
- Voivodeship: Kuyavian-Pomeranian
- County: Tuchola
- Gmina: Cekcyn

Sarnówek [sarˈnuvɛk] is a village in the administrative district of Gmina Cekcyn, within Tuchola County, Kuyavian-Pomeranian Voivodeship, in north-central Poland.
