= Wielonek, Kuyavian-Pomeranian Voivodeship =

Wielonek
- Village
- Location within Poland
- Coordinates: 53°23′06″N 17°58′31″E
- Country: Poland
- Voivodeship: Kuyavian-Pomeranian
- County: Tuchola
- Gmina: Lubiewo
- Population: 2

Wielonek [vjɛˈlɔnɛk] is a village in the administrative district of Gmina Lubiewo, within Tuchola County, Kuyavian-Pomeranian Voivodeship, in north-central Poland.
