= Brzozowe Błota =

- Village
- Location within Poland
- Coordinates: 53°40′27″N 18°7′8″E
- Country: Poland
- Voivodeship: Kuyavian-Pomeranian
- County: Tuchola
- Gmina: Śliwice

Brzozowe Błota [bʐɔˈzɔvɛ ˈbwɔta] is a village in the administrative district of Gmina Śliwice, within Tuchola County, Kuyavian-Pomeranian Voivodeship, in north-central Poland.
