= Mała Huta, Kuyavian-Pomeranian Voivodeship =

Mała Huta
- Village
- Location within Poland
- Coordinates: 53°33′11″N 17°58′41″E
- Country: Poland
- Voivodeship: Kuyavian-Pomeranian
- County: Tuchola
- Gmina: Cekcyn
- Population: 60

Mała Huta [ˈmawa ˈxuta] is a village in the administrative district of Gmina Cekcyn, within Tuchola County, Kuyavian-Pomeranian Voivodeship, in north-central Poland.
