= Sowiniec =

Sowiniec may refer to the following places:

- Sowiniec, Greater Poland Voivodeship (west-central Poland)
- Sowiniec, Kuyavian-Pomeranian Voivodeship (north-central Poland)
- Sowiniec, Lublin Voivodeship (east Poland)
- Sowiniec, West Pomeranian Voivodeship (north-west Poland)
