= Skrajna =

- Village
- Location within Poland
- Coordinates: 53°32′31″N 18°00′34″E
- Country: Poland
- Voivodeship: Kuyavian-Pomeranian
- County: Tuchola
- Gmina: Cekcyn

Skrajna [ˈskrai̯na] is a village in the administrative district of Gmina Cekcyn, within Tuchola County, Kuyavian-Pomeranian Voivodeship, in north-central Poland.
