= Wielkie Gacno =

- Village
- Location within Poland
- Coordinates: 53°37′59″N 18°06′19″E
- Country: Poland
- Voivodeship: Kuyavian-Pomeranian
- County: Tuchola
- Gmina: Cekcyn
- Population: 130

Wielkie Gacno (Polish pronunciation: [ˈvjɛlkʲɛ ˈɡat͡snɔ]) is a village in the administrative district of Gmina Cekcyn, within Tuchola County, Kuyavian-Pomeranian Voivodeship, in north-central Poland.
