= Victoria Śliwice =

Football club in Poland

GKS Victoria Śliwice
- Full name: Gminy Klub Sportowy Victoria Śliwice
- Founded: 1946
- League: Klasa B: Bydgoszcz II
- 2021/2: 8th of 11
- Website: GKS Victoria Śliwice 2016 on Facebook
Home colors

Victoria Śliwice is a football club based in Śliwice, Poland. As of the 2026/7 season, they do not field a senior team in the league system having last played in Klasa B in 2022.

== History ==
Founded in 1946 the club was reactivated in 2016 after a period of absence from the regional league system. Entering Klasa B, they won their first three games to go to the top of the division, eventually finishing the season in 5th place.

Article about youth tournement in 2015. In 2023 the club was awarded zł18,000 funding by the local administration of Gmina Śliwice. In 2025, Victoria took part in a charity cup competition alongside other regional teams including Wda Świecie.
