= Lipowa, Kuyavian-Pomeranian Voivodeship =

Village in Kociewie

Lipowa
- Village
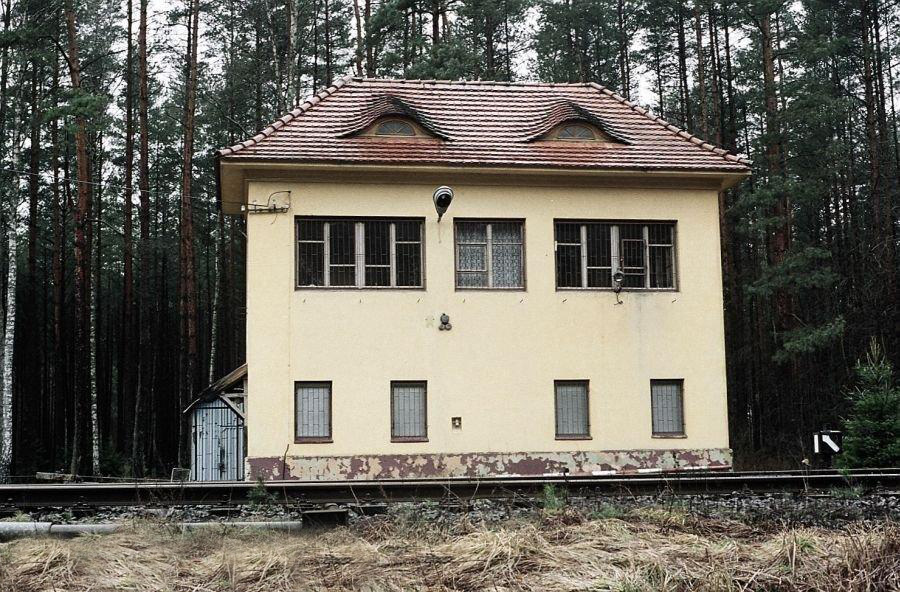
- The signal box at Lipowa

- Location within Poland
- Coordinates: 53°44′27″N 18°7′11″E
- Country: Poland
- Voivodeship: Kuyavian-Pomeranian
- County: Tuchola
- Gmina: Śliwice
- Population: 190

Lipowa [liˈpɔva] is a village in the administrative district of Gmina Śliwice, within Tuchola County, Kuyavian-Pomeranian Voivodeship, in north-central Poland.
