= Lubocień =

- Village
- Location within Poland
- Coordinates: 53°43′44″N 18°6′23″E
- Country: Poland
- Voivodeship: Kuyavian-Pomeranian
- County: Tuchola
- Gmina: Śliwice
- Population: 120

Lubocień [luˈbɔt͡ɕɛɲ] is a village in the administrative district of Gmina Śliwice, within Tuchola County, Kuyavian-Pomeranian Voivodeship, in north-central Poland.
