= Okoninek =

- Village
- Location within Poland
- Coordinates: 53°35′30″N 18°01′46″E
- Country: Poland
- Voivodeship: Kuyavian-Pomeranian
- County: Tuchola
- Gmina: Cekcyn

Okoninek [ɔkɔˈninɛk] is a village in the administrative district of Gmina Cekcyn, within Tuchola County, Kuyavian-Pomeranian Voivodeship, in north-central Poland.
