= Sucha, Kuyavian-Pomeranian Voivodeship =

Sucha
- Village
- Location within Poland
- Coordinates: 53°24′N 18°0′E
- Country: Poland
- Voivodeship: Kuyavian-Pomeranian
- County: Tuchola
- Gmina: Lubiewo
- Population: 604

Sucha [ˈsuxa] is a village in the administrative district of Gmina Lubiewo, within Tuchola County, Kuyavian-Pomeranian Voivodeship, in north-central Poland.
