= Łąski Piec =

Village in Kociewie

- Village
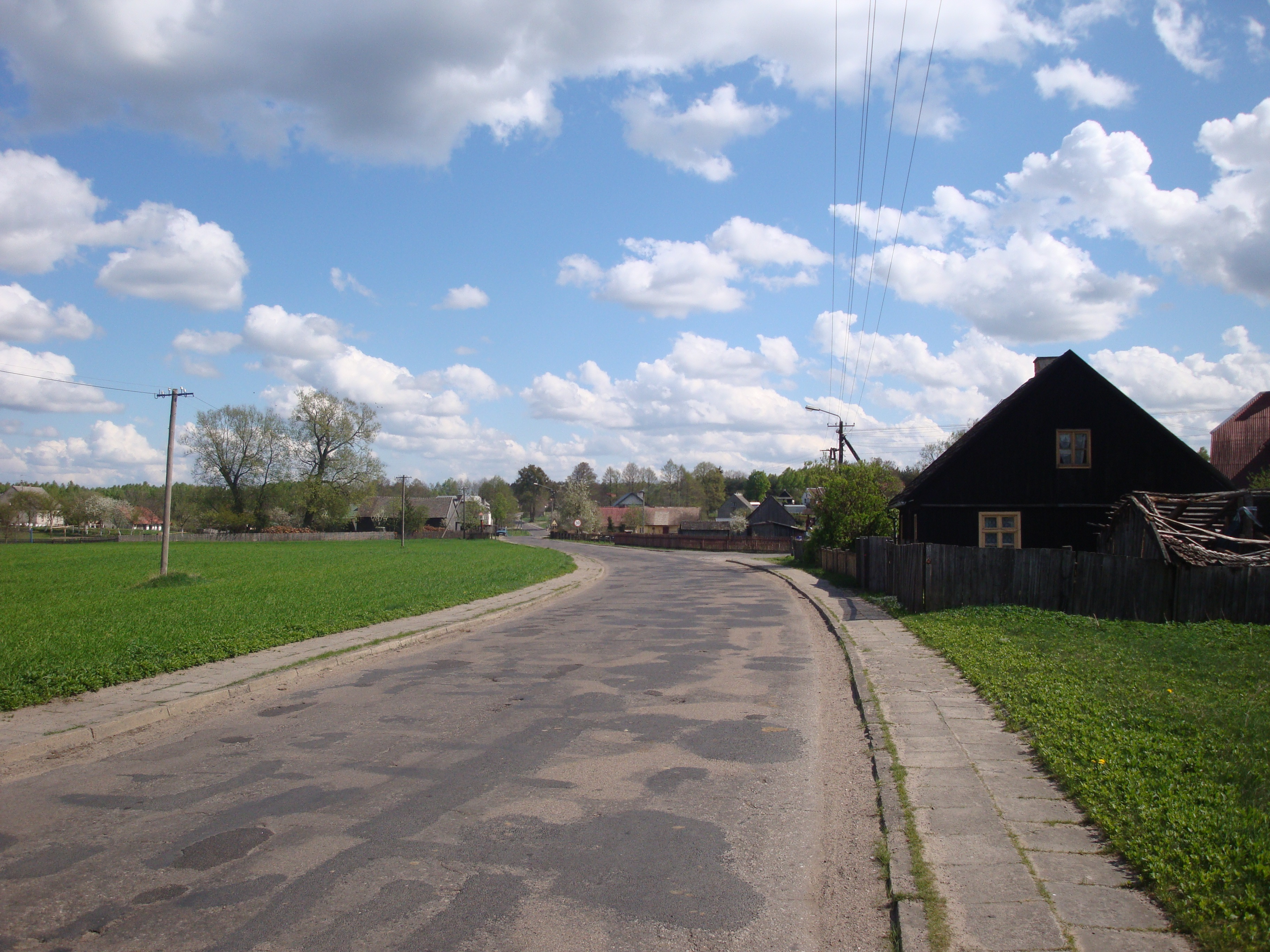

- Location within Poland
- Coordinates: 53°38′49″N 18°12′30″E
- Country: Poland
- Voivodeship: Kuyavian-Pomeranian
- County: Tuchola
- Gmina: Śliwice
- Population: 180

Łąski Piec [ˈwɔ̃ski ˈpjɛt͡s] is a village in the administrative district of Gmina Śliwice, within Tuchola County, Kuyavian-Pomeranian Voivodeship, in north-central Poland.
