= Rosochatka =

- Village
- Location within Poland
- Coordinates: 53°42′33″N 18°7′39″E
- Country: Poland
- Voivodeship: Kuyavian-Pomeranian
- County: Tuchola
- Gmina: Śliwice
- Population: 240

Rosochatka [rɔsɔˈxatka] is a village in the administrative district of Gmina Śliwice, within Tuchola County, Kuyavian-Pomeranian Voivodeship, in north-central Poland.
