= Zalesie, Tuchola County =

Zalesie
- Village
- Location within Poland
- Coordinates: 53°36′54″N 18°0′44″E
- Country: Poland
- Voivodeship: Kuyavian-Pomeranian
- County: Tuchola
- Gmina: Cekcyn

Population
  - Total: 230
- Time zone: UTC+1 (CET)
  - Summer (DST): UTC+2 (CEST)
- Vehicle registration: CTU

Zalesie [zaˈlɛɕɛ] is a village in the administrative district of Gmina Cekcyn, within Tuchola County, Kuyavian-Pomeranian Voivodeship, in north-central Poland.

Six Polish citizens were murdered by Nazi Germany in the village during World War II.
