= Laski, Kuyavian-Pomeranian Voivodeship =

Village in Kociewie

Laski
- Village
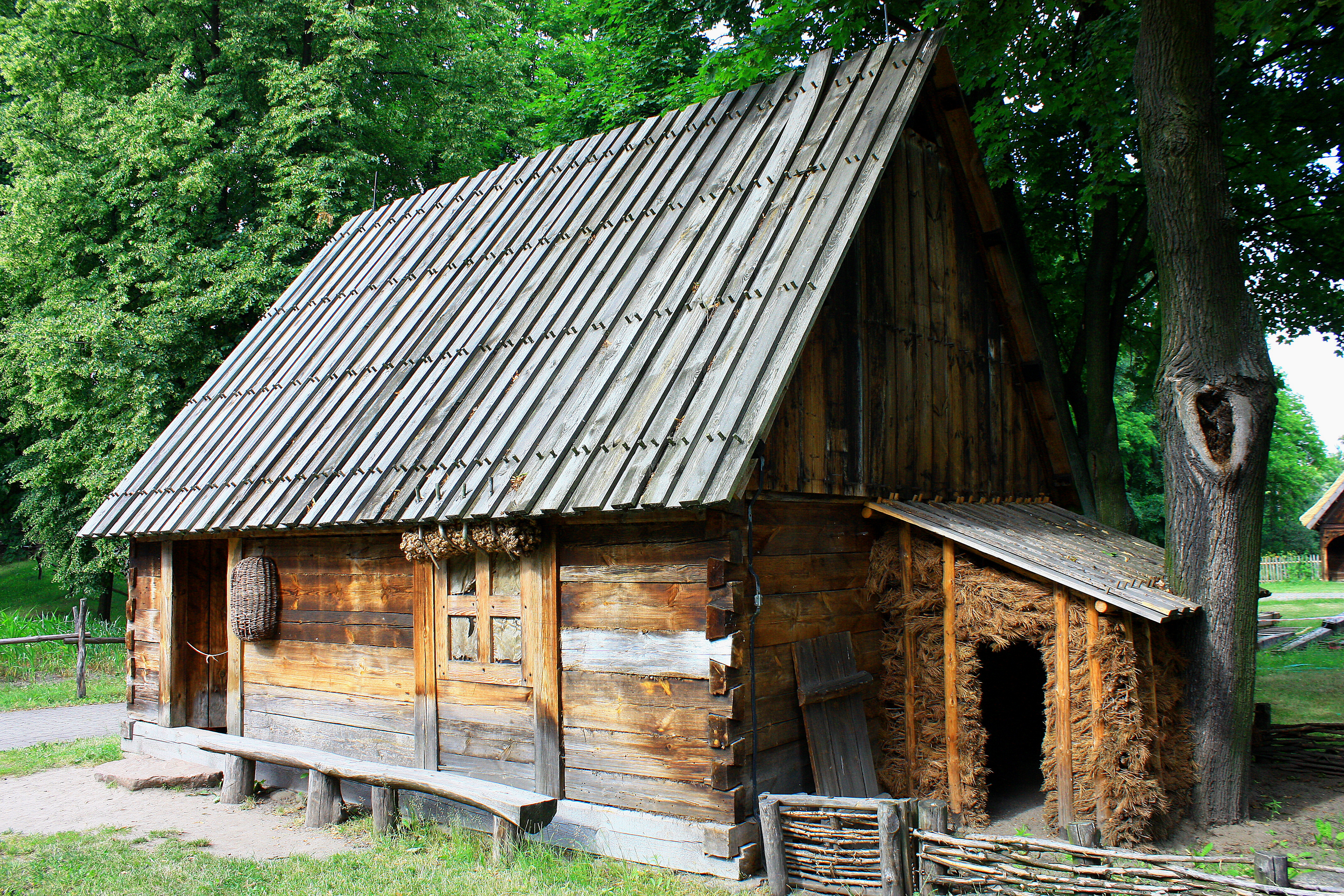
- A traditional farmhouse from Laski on display at the Toruń Ethnographic Museum

- Location within Poland
- Coordinates: 53°40′19″N 18°13′0″E
- Country: Poland
- Voivodeship: Kuyavian-Pomeranian
- County: Tuchola
- Gmina: Śliwice
- Population: 120

Laski (Polish pronunciation: [ˈlaskʲi]) is a village in the administrative district of Gmina Śliwice, within Tuchola County, Kuyavian-Pomeranian Voivodeship, in north-central Poland.
