= Małe Gacno =

- Village
- Location within Poland
- Coordinates: 53°36′27″N 18°6′15″E
- Country: Poland
- Voivodeship: Kuyavian-Pomeranian
- County: Tuchola
- Gmina: Cekcyn
- Population: 230

Małe Gacno (Polish pronunciation: [ˈmawɛ ˈɡat͡snɔ]) is a village in the administrative district of Gmina Cekcyn, within Tuchola County, Kuyavian-Pomeranian Voivodeship, in north-central Poland.
