= Dębowiec, Tuchola County =

Dębowiec
- Colony
- Location within Poland
- Coordinates: 53°35′N 18°1′E
- Country: Poland
- Voivodeship: Kuyavian-Pomeranian
- County: Tuchola
- Gmina: Cekcyn

Dębowiec [dɛmˈbɔvjɛt͡s] is a colony in the administrative district of Gmina Cekcyn, within Tuchola County, Kuyavian-Pomeranian Voivodeship, in north-central Poland.
