= Szklana Huta, Kuyavian-Pomeranian Voivodeship =

Szklana Huta
- Village
- Location within Poland
- Coordinates: 53°36′20″N 18°07′07″E
- Country: Poland
- Voivodeship: Kuyavian-Pomeranian
- County: Tuchola
- Gmina: Cekcyn

Szklana Huta [ˈʂklana ˈxuta] is a village in the administrative district of Gmina Cekcyn, within Tuchola County, Kuyavian-Pomeranian Voivodeship, in north-central Poland.
