= Stary Sumin =

- Village
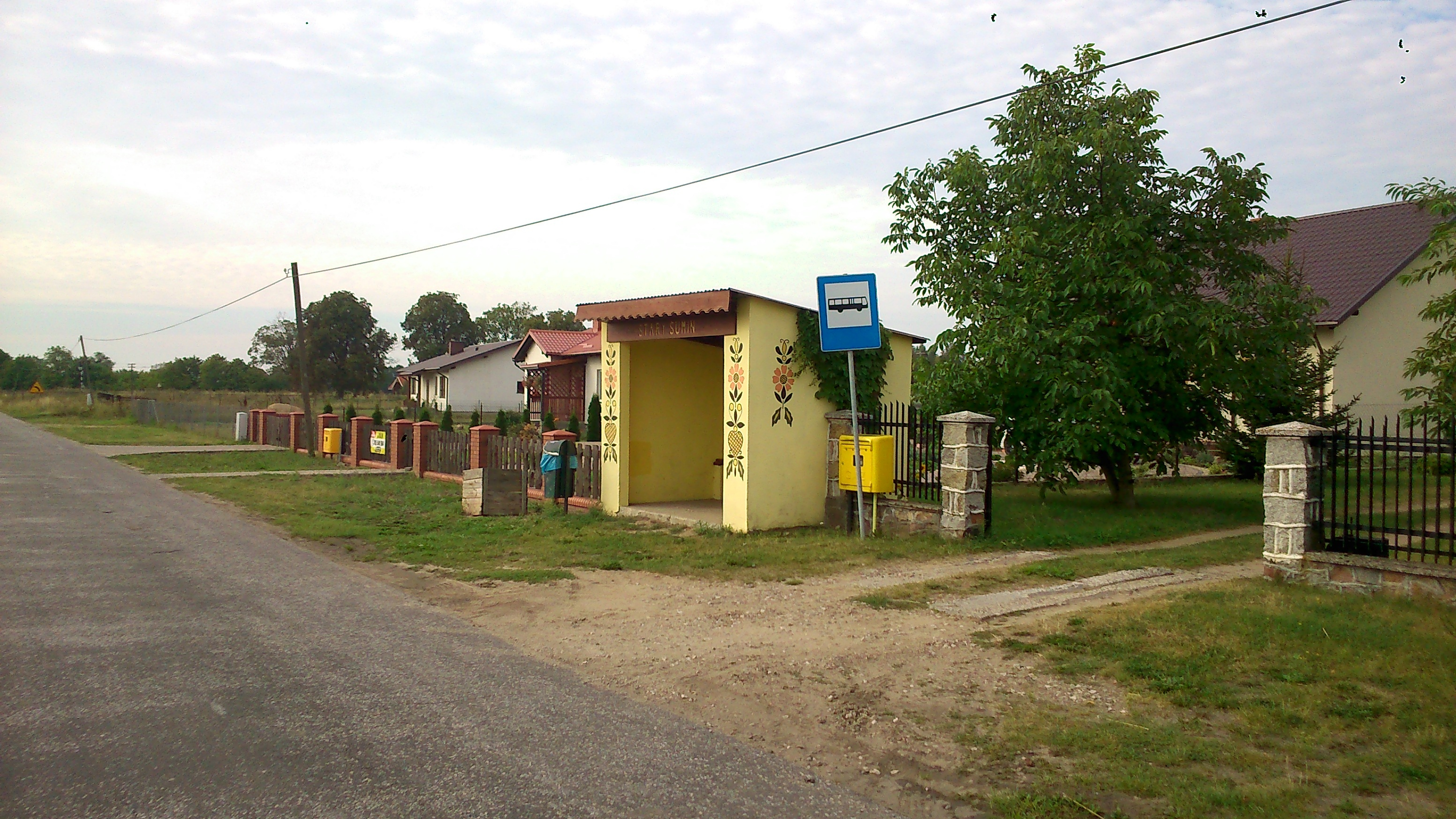
- Bus stop decorated with local motif.

- Location within Poland
- Coordinates: 53°35′3″N 18°0′48″E
- Country: Poland
- Voivodeship: Kuyavian-Pomeranian
- County: Tuchola
- Gmina: Cekcyn
- Population: 160

Stary Sumin [ˈstarɨ ˈsumin] is a village in the administrative district of Gmina Cekcyn, within Tuchola County, Kuyavian-Pomeranian Voivodeship, in north-central Poland.
