= Zwierzyniec, Kuyavian-Pomeranian Voivodeship =

Zwierzyniec
- Village
- Location within Poland
- Coordinates: 53°43′5″N 18°4′27″E
- Country: Poland
- Voivodeship: Kuyavian-Pomeranian
- County: Tuchola
- Gmina: Śliwice
- Population: 40

Zwierzyniec (Polish pronunciation: [zvjɛˈʐɨɲɛt͡s]) is a village in the administrative district of Gmina Śliwice, within Tuchola County, Kuyavian-Pomeranian Voivodeship, in north-central Poland.
