= Wierzchlas =

Wierzchlas may refer to:

- Wierzchlas, Kuyavian-Pomeranian Voivodeship (north-central Poland)
- Wierzchlas, Łódź Voivodeship (central Poland)
- Wierzchlas, West Pomeranian Voivodeship (north-west Poland)
