= Stary Wierzchucin =

- Village
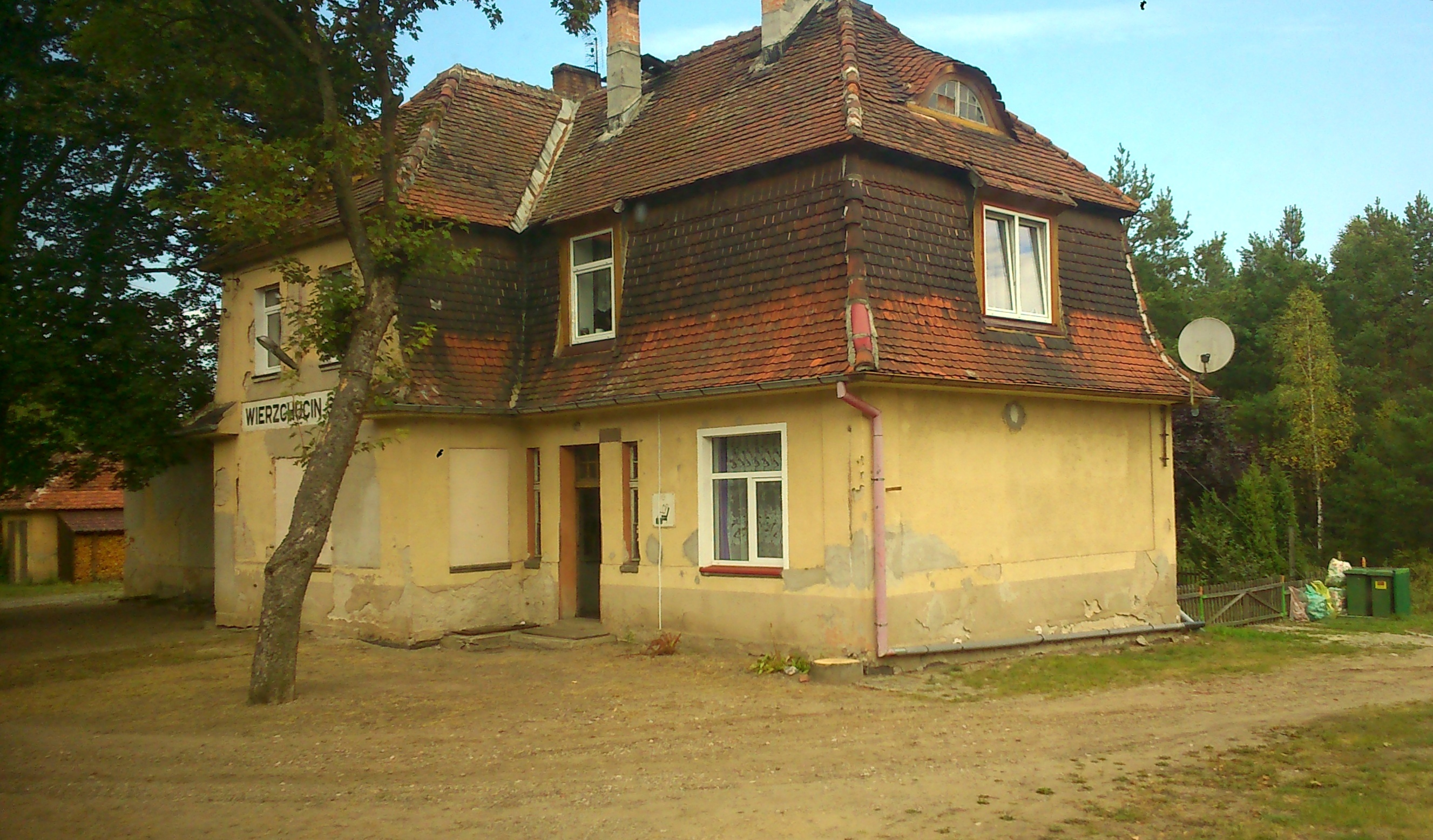

- Location within Poland
- Coordinates: 53°33′23″N 18°05′30″E
- Country: Poland
- Voivodeship: Kuyavian-Pomeranian
- County: Tuchola
- Gmina: Cekcyn
- Population: 40

Stary Wierzchucin [ˈstarɨ vjɛʂˈxut͡ɕin] is a village in the administrative district of Gmina Cekcyn, within Tuchola County, Kuyavian-Pomeranian Voivodeship, in north-central Poland.
