= Wielkie Koralskie Błota =

Wielkie Kowalskie Błota
- Village
- Location within Poland
- Coordinates: 53°38′00″N 17°58′58″E
- Country: Poland
- Voivodeship: Kuyavian-Pomeranian
- County: Tuchola
- Gmina: Cekcyn

Wielkie Kowalskie Błota [ˈvjɛlkʲɛ kɔˈralskʲɛ ˈbwɔta] is a village in the administrative district of Gmina Cekcyn, within Tuchola County, Kuyavian-Pomeranian Voivodeship, in north-central Poland.
