= Brzozie, Tuchola County =

Brzozie
- Village
- Location within Poland
- Coordinates: 53°35′N 18°6′E
- Country: Poland
- Voivodeship: Kuyavian-Pomeranian
- County: Tuchola
- Gmina: Cekcyn
- Population: 200

Brzozie [ˈbʐɔʑɛ] is a village in the administrative district of Gmina Cekcyn, within Tuchola County, Kuyavian-Pomeranian Voivodeship, in north-central Poland.
