= Kiełpiński Most =

- Village
- Location within Poland
- Coordinates: 53°37′36″N 17°58′04″E
- Country: Poland
- Voivodeship: Kuyavian-Pomeranian
- County: Tuchola
- Gmina: Cekcyn

Kiełpiński Most [kʲɛu̯ˈpiɲski ˈmɔst] is a village in the administrative district of Gmina Cekcyn, within Tuchola County, Kuyavian-Pomeranian Voivodeship, in north-central Poland.
