= Szumiąca =

Szumiąca may refer to the following places:

- Szumiąca, Kuyavian-Pomeranian Voivodeship (north-central Poland)
- Szumiąca, Lubusz Voivodeship (west Poland)
- Szumiąca, West Pomeranian Voivodeship (north-west Poland)
