= Swit =

Swit may refer to:

== Places ==
- Świt, Gmina Cekcyn, a village in Gmina Cekcyn, Poland
- Świt, Gmina Gostycyn, a village in Gmina Gostycyn, Poland

== Music ==
- Świt, a song by Daria Zawiałow, Błażej Król and Igor Walaszek

== As a surname ==
- Loretta Swit (1937–2025), an American actress
