= Knieja, Tuchola County =

Knieja
- Village
- Location within Poland
- Coordinates: 53°33′41″N 17°58′35″E
- Country: Poland
- Voivodeship: Kuyavian-Pomeranian
- County: Tuchola
- Gmina: Cekcyn

Knieja [ˈkɲɛja] is a village in the administrative district of Gmina Cekcyn, within Tuchola County, Kuyavian-Pomeranian Voivodeship, in north-central Poland.
