= Główka, Kuyavian-Pomeranian Voivodeship =

Główka
- Village
- Location within Poland
- Coordinates: 53°42′9″N 18°5′54″E
- Country: Poland
- Voivodeship: Kuyavian-Pomeranian
- County: Tuchola
- Gmina: Śliwice
- Population: 50

Główka [ˈɡwufka] is a village in the administrative district of Gmina Śliwice, within Tuchola County, Kuyavian-Pomeranian Voivodeship, in north-central Poland.
