= Błądzim-Dworzec =

- Village
- Location within Poland
- Coordinates: 53°28′37″N 18°06′50″E
- Country: Poland
- Voivodeship: Kuyavian-Pomeranian
- County: Tuchola
- Gmina: Cekcyn

Błądzim-Dworzec (Polish pronunciation: [ˈbwɔɲd͡ʑim ˈdvɔʐɛt͡s]) is a village in the administrative district of Gmina Cekcyn, within Tuchola County, Kuyavian-Pomeranian Voivodeship, in north-central Poland.
