= Kosowo, Tuchola County =

Kosowo
- Village
- Location within Poland
- Coordinates: 53°33′N 18°3′E
- Country: Poland
- Voivodeship: Kuyavian-Pomeranian
- County: Tuchola
- Gmina: Cekcyn

Kosowo [kɔˈsɔvɔ] is a village in the administrative district of Gmina Cekcyn, within Tuchola County, Kuyavian-Pomeranian Voivodeship, in north-central Poland.
