= Ludwichowo =

Ludwichowo may refer to the following places:

- Ludwichowo, Grudziądz County in Kuyavian-Pomeranian Voivodeship (north-central Poland)
- Ludwichowo, Gmina Cekcyn in Kuyavian-Pomeranian Voivodeship (north-central Poland)
- Ludwichowo, Gmina Kęsowo in Kuyavian-Pomeranian Voivodeship (north-central Poland)
- Ludwichowo, Warmian-Masurian Voivodeship (north Poland)
