= Błądzim, Tuchola County =

Błądzim
- Village
- Location within Poland
- Coordinates: 53°29′23″N 18°08′21″E
- Country: Poland
- Voivodeship: Kuyavian-Pomeranian
- County: Tuchola
- Gmina: Cekcyn

Błądzim (Polish pronunciation: [ˈbwɔɲd͡ʑim]) is a village in the administrative district of Gmina Cekcyn, within Tuchola County, Kuyavian-Pomeranian Voivodeship, in north-central Poland.
