= Szczuczanek =

- Village
- Location within Poland
- Coordinates: 53°36′58″N 18°2′22″E
- Country: Poland
- Voivodeship: Kuyavian-Pomeranian
- County: Tuchola
- Gmina: Cekcyn

Szczuczanek [ʂt͡ʂuˈt͡ʂanɛk] is a village in the administrative district of Gmina Cekcyn, within Tuchola County, Kuyavian-Pomeranian Voivodeship, in north-central Poland.
