= Huta, Tuchola County =

Huta
- Village
- Location within Poland
- Coordinates: 53°33′49″N 17°58′52″E
- Country: Poland
- Voivodeship: Kuyavian-Pomeranian
- County: Tuchola
- Gmina: Cekcyn
- Population: 40

Huta [ˈxuta] is a village in the administrative district of Gmina Cekcyn, within Tuchola County, Kuyavian-Pomeranian Voivodeship, in north-central Poland.
