= Brukniewo =

- Village
- Location within Poland
- Coordinates: 53°27′9″N 18°3′8″E
- Country: Poland
- Voivodeship: Kuyavian-Pomeranian
- County: Tuchola
- Gmina: Lubiewo
- Population: 28

Brukniewo [brukˈɲɛvɔ] is a village in the administrative district of Gmina Lubiewo, within Tuchola County, Kuyavian-Pomeranian Voivodeship, in north-central Poland.
