= Koźliny, Kuyavian-Pomeranian Voivodeship =

Koźliny
- Village
- Location within Poland
- Coordinates: 53°25′37″N 18°03′03″E
- Country: Poland
- Voivodeship: Kuyavian-Pomeranian
- County: Tuchola
- Gmina: Lubiewo
- Population: 1

Koźliny [kɔˈʑlinɨ] is a village in the administrative district of Gmina Lubiewo, within Tuchola County, Kuyavian-Pomeranian Voivodeship, in north-central Poland.
