= Brzeźno, Tuchola County =

Village in Kociewie

Brzeźno
- Village
- Location within Poland
- Coordinates: 53°43′2″N 18°15′41″E
- Country: Poland
- Voivodeship: Kuyavian-Pomeranian
- County: Tuchola
- Gmina: Śliwice
- Population: 183

Brzeźno [bʐɛʑnɔ] (German: Banditendorf, 1939–45) is a village in the administrative district of Gmina Śliwice, within Tuchola County, Kuyavian-Pomeranian Voivodeship, in north-central Poland.

== History ==
The first mention of Brzeźno in the historical record dates back to 1756. During the Nazi occupation of Poland, the village was administered as part of Reichsgau Danzig-West Prussia. Brzeźno was subsequently renamed Banditendorf (lit. 'the village of bandits') by the Germans, due to the high number of partisans resident in the village. In September 1944, 5 residents of the village were executed by the Nazis on charges of collaborating with partisans.
