= Golabek (surname) =

Golabek is a surname. In Polish gołąbek is diminutive of gołąb; pigeon, dove. Notable people with the surname include:

- Jakub Gołąbek (1739–1789), Polish composer and singer (tenor)
- Mona Golabek (born 1954), American concert pianist, author, and radio host
- Stuart Golabek (born 1974), Scottish footballer
