= Bysław =

- Village
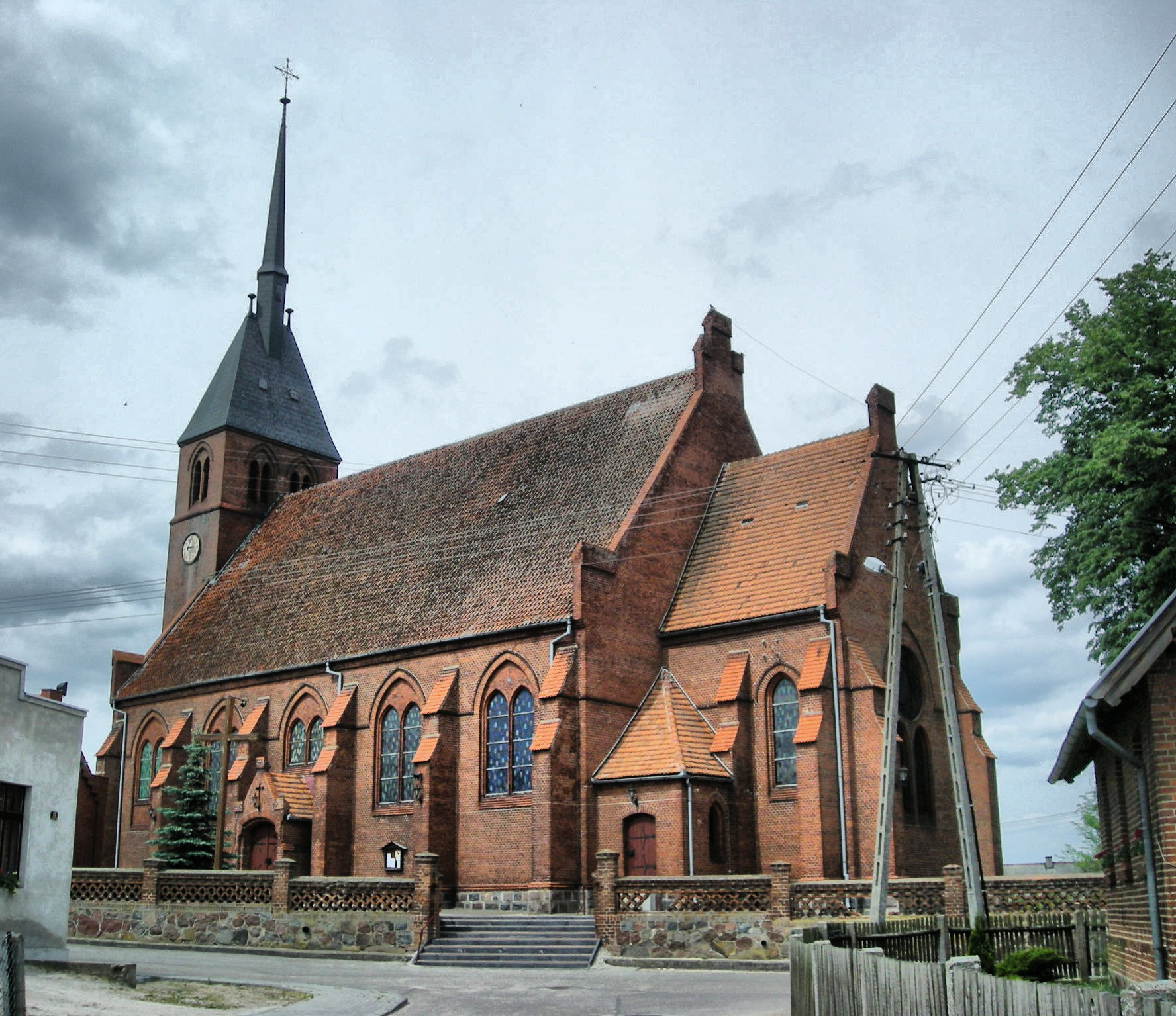
- Church of the Transfiguration in Bysław

- Location within Poland
- Coordinates: 53°30′25″N 17°59′38″E
- Country: Poland
- Voivodeship: Kuyavian-Pomeranian
- County: Tuchola
- Gmina: Lubiewo
- Population: 1,500
- Time zone: UTC+1 (CET)
  - Summer (DST): UTC+2 (CEST)
- Vehicle registration: CTU
- Website: http://www.byslaw.las.pl/index.html

Bysław [ˈbɨswaf] is a village in the administrative district of Gmina Lubiewo, within Tuchola County, Kuyavian-Pomeranian Voivodeship, in north-central Poland. It is located within the Tuchola Forest in the historic region of Pomerania.

== History ==
The name of the village comes from the Old Polish male name Zbysław. Bysław was a royal village of the Polish Crown, administratively located in the Tuchola County in the Pomeranian Voivodeship.

During the German occupation of Poland (World War II), the Germans murdered several Polish farmers and the local priest during large massacres of Poles in Rudzki Most. In 1941, the Germans expelled 105 Poles, who were initially deported to the Potulice concentration camp, where two children died, and afterwards some were deported to forced labour to Germany. Their farms were handed over to German colonists as part of the Lebensraum policy. Further expulsions were carried out in 1942–1943.
