= Gołąbek, Kuyavian-Pomeranian Voivodeship =

Gołąbek
- Village
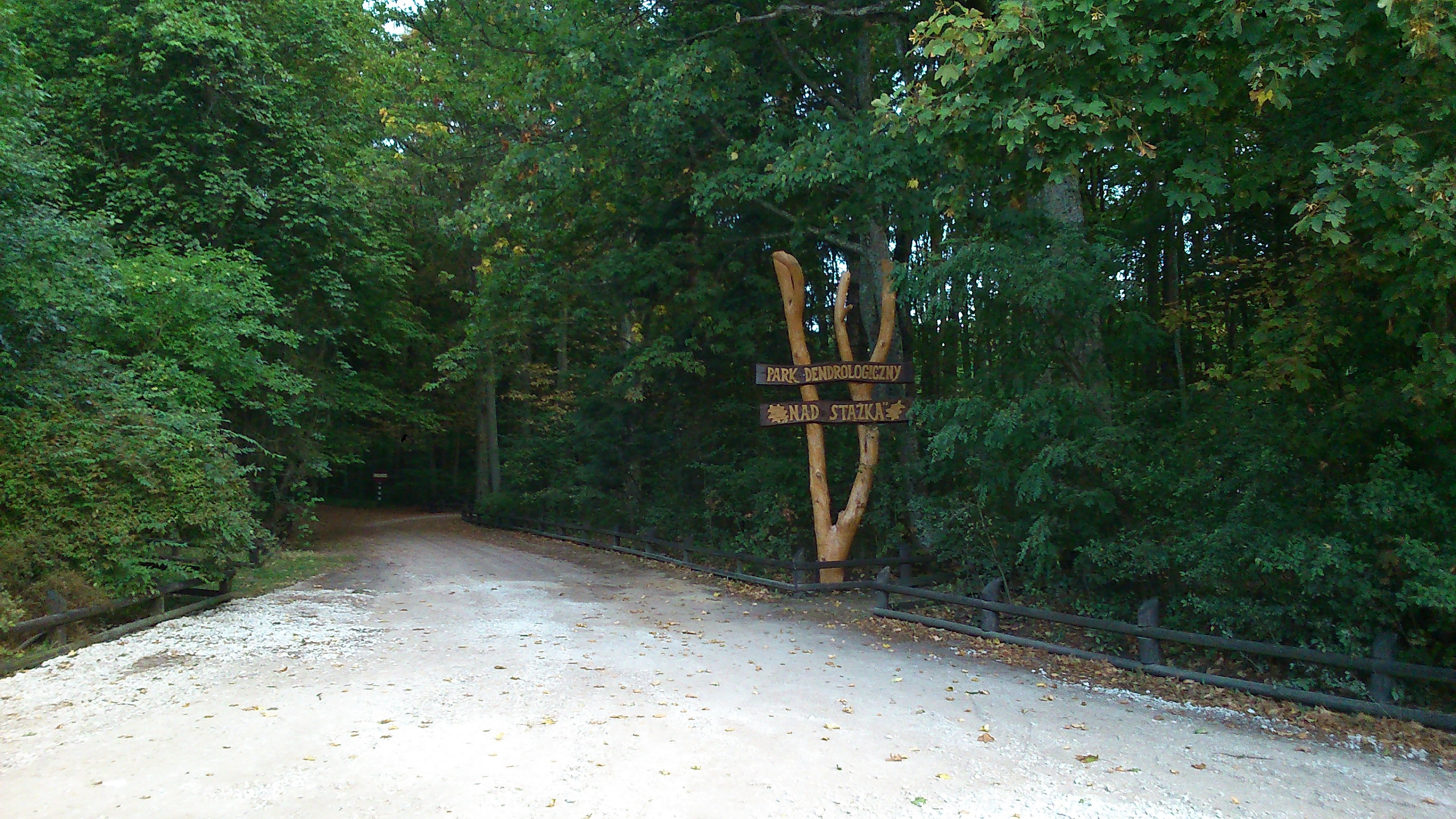
- Entrance to arboretum

- Location within Poland
- Coordinates: 53°36′56″N 17°57′13″E
- Country: Poland
- Voivodeship: Kuyavian-Pomeranian
- County: Tuchola
- Gmina: Cekcyn
- Population: 100

Gołąbek [ɡɔˈwɔmbɛk] is a village in the administrative district of Gmina Cekcyn, within Tuchola County, Kuyavian-Pomeranian Voivodeship, in north-central Poland.
