= Gmina Lubiewo =

Gmina Lubiewo Lubiewo Commune
- Gmina
- Flag Coat of arms
- Interactive map of Gmina Lubiewo
- Coordinates (Lubiewo): 53°28′1″N 18°1′6″E
- Country: Poland
- Voivodeship: Kuyavian-Pomeranian
- County: Tuchola
- Seat: Lubiewo

Area
  - Total: 162.8 km^{2} (62.9 sq mi)

Population (2006)
  - Total: 5,717
  - Density: 35.12/km^{2} (90.95/sq mi)

Gmina Lubiewo is a rural gmina (administrative district) in Tuchola County, Kuyavian-Pomeranian Voivodeship, in north-central Poland. Its seat is the village of Lubiewo, which lies approximately 19 kilometres (12 mi) south-east of Tuchola and 39 km (24 mi) north of Bydgoszcz.

The gmina covers an area of 162.8 square kilometres (62.9 sq mi), and as of 2006 its total population is 5,717.

The gmina contains part of the protected area called Tuchola Landscape Park.

== Villages ==
Gmina Lubiewo contains the villages and settlements of Bruchniewo, Brukniewo, Bysław, Bysławek, Cierplewo, Klonowo, Koźliny, Lubiewice, Lubiewo, Minikowo, Płazowo, Sokole-Kuźnica, Sucha, Szumiąca, Szyszkówka, Teolog, Trutnowo, Wandowo, Wełpin, Wielonek and Zamrzenica.

== Neighbouring gminas ==
Gmina Lubiewo is bordered by the gminas of Cekcyn, Gostycyn, Koronowo and Świekatowo.
