= Świt, Gmina Cekcyn =

Świt
- Village
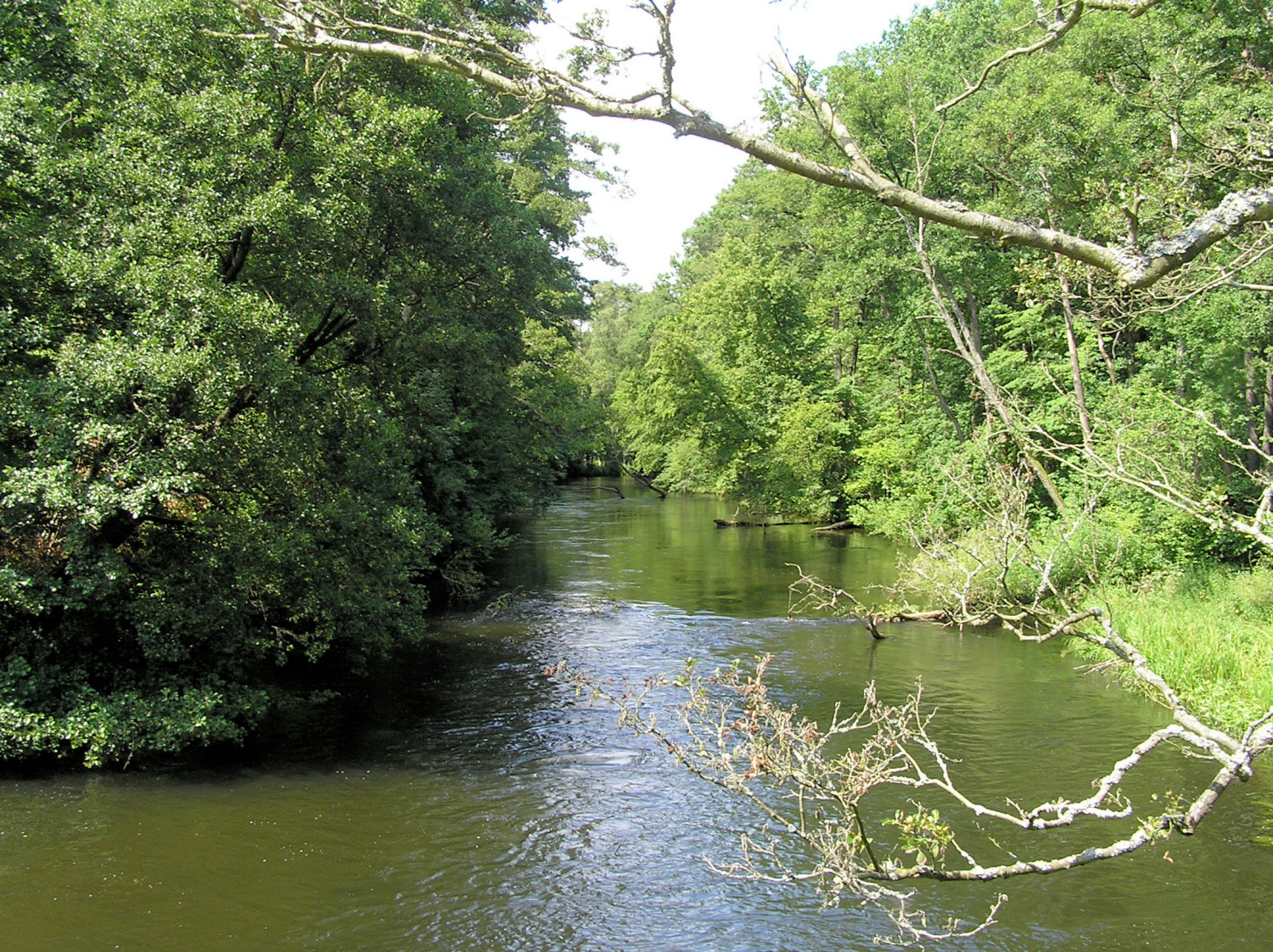
- River in Świt

- Location within Poland
- Coordinates: 53°32′43″N 17°52′56″E
- Country: Poland
- Voivodeship: Kuyavian-Pomeranian
- County: Tuchola
- Gmina: Cekcyn

Świt [ɕfit] is a village in the administrative district of Gmina Cekcyn, within Tuchola County, Kuyavian-Pomeranian Voivodeship, in north-central Poland.
