= Klonowo, Tuchola County =

Village in Gmina Lubiewo, Poland

Klonowo
- Village
- Location within Poland
- Coordinates: 53°27′3″N 17°58′9″E
- Country: Poland
- Voivodeship: Kuyavian-Pomeranian
- County: Tuchola
- Gmina: Lubiewo
- Population: 600

Klonowo (Polish pronunciation: [klɔˈnɔvɔ]) is a village in the administrative district of Gmina Lubiewo, within Tuchola County, Kuyavian-Pomeranian Voivodeship, in north-central Poland.
