= Szumiąca, Kuyavian-Pomeranian Voivodeship =

Szumiąca
- Village
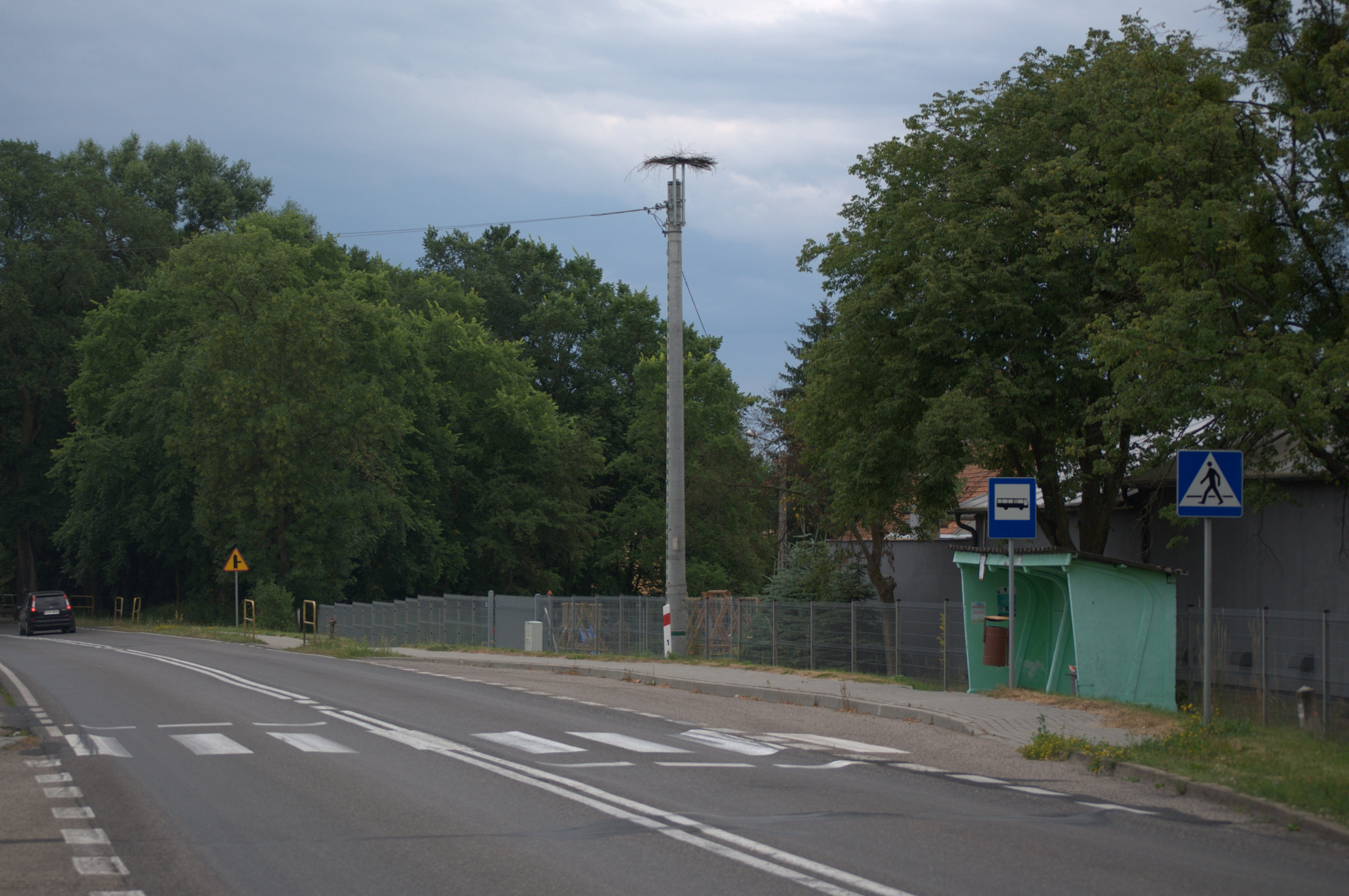

- Location within Poland
- Coordinates: 52°42′13″N 18°35′08″E
- Country: Poland
- Voivodeship: Kuyavian-Pomeranian
- County: Tuchola
- Gmina: Lubiewo
- Population: 67
- Time zone: UTC+1 (CET)
  - Summer (DST): UTC+2 (CEST)
- Vehicle registration: CTU

Szumiąca [ʂuˈmjɔnt͡sa] is a village in the administrative district of Gmina Lubiewo, within Tuchola County, Kuyavian-Pomeranian Voivodeship, in north-central Poland.

== History ==
During the German occupation of Poland (World War II), Szumiąca was one of the sites of executions of Poles, carried out by the Germans in 1939 as part of the Intelligenzaktion. Polish farmers from Szumiąca were also among the victims of a massacre of Poles from the region, perpetrated by the Selbstschutz on October 27, 1939, in nearby Rudzki Most.
