= Bysławek =

- Village
- Location within Poland
- Coordinates: 53°29′27″N 17°58′6″E
- Country: Poland
- Voivodeship: Kuyavian-Pomeranian
- County: Tuchola
- Gmina: Lubiewo
- Population: 340

Bysławek (Polish pronunciation: [bɨˈswavɛk]) is a village in the administrative district of Gmina Lubiewo, within Tuchola County, Kuyavian-Pomeranian Voivodeship, in north-central Poland.
