= Jelenia Góra, Kuyavian-Pomeranian Voivodeship =

Jelenia Góra
- Village
- Location within Poland
- Coordinates: 53°34′21″N 18°08′55″E
- Country: Poland
- Voivodeship: Kuyavian-Pomeranian
- County: Tuchola
- Gmina: Cekcyn

Jelenia Góra [jɛˈlɛɲa ˈɡura] is a village in the administrative district of Gmina Cekcyn, within Tuchola County, Kuyavian-Pomeranian Voivodeship, in north-central Poland.
