= Ludwichowo, Gmina Cekcyn =

Village in Kociewie

Ludwichowo
- Village
- Location within Poland
- Coordinates: 53°37′8″N 18°9′45″E
- Country: Poland
- Voivodeship: Kuyavian-Pomeranian
- County: Tuchola
- Gmina: Cekcyn
- Population: 120

Ludwichowo [ludviˈxɔvɔ] is a village in the administrative district of Gmina Cekcyn, within Tuchola County, Kuyavian-Pomeranian Voivodeship, in north-central Poland.
