= Śliwice, Kuyavian–Pomeranian Voivodeship =

Śliwice
- Village
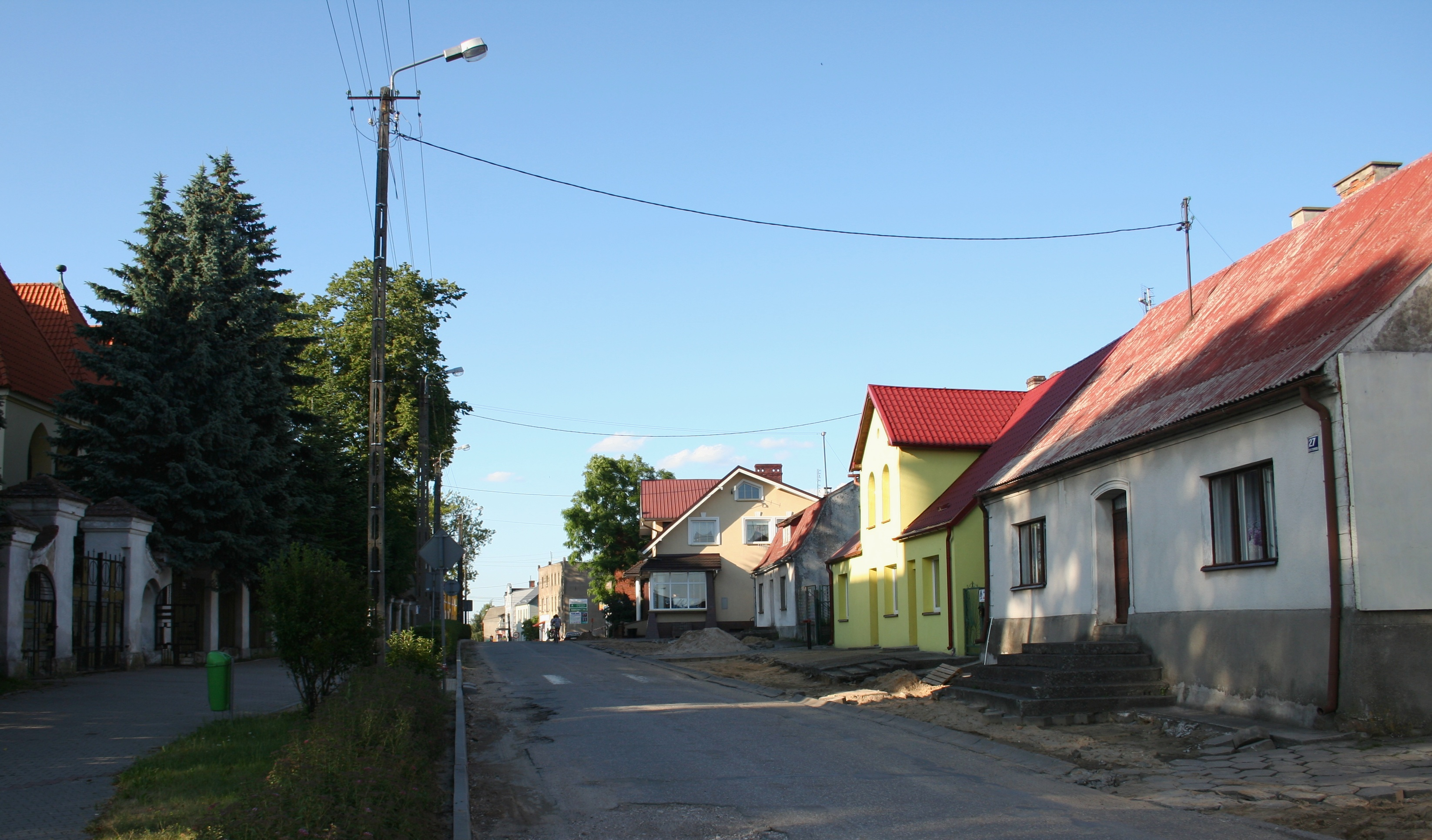

- Coat of arms

- Location within Poland
- Coordinates: 53°42′41″N 18°10′38″E
- Country: Poland
- Voivodeship: Kuyavian-Pomeranian
- County: Tuchola
- Gmina: Śliwice
- Population: 2,600

Śliwice ([ɕliˈvit͡sɛ]) is a village in Tuchola County, Kuyavian-Pomeranian Voivodeship, in north-central Poland. It is the seat of the gmina (administrative district) called Gmina Śliwice.

== Sports ==
The village is represented by the football club Victoria Śliwice.

== Notable residents ==
- Agnieszka Kłopotek (born 1969), a Polish politician and zootechnician
- Eugeniusz Kłopotek (born 1953), a Polish politician and zootechnician
