= Sowiniec, Kuyavian-Pomeranian Voivodeship =

Sowiniec
- Village
- Location within Poland
- Coordinates: 53°37′35″N 18°01′06″E
- Country: Poland
- Voivodeship: Kuyavian-Pomeranian
- County: Tuchola
- Gmina: Cekcyn

Sowiniec [sɔˈviɲɛt͡s] is a village in the administrative district of Gmina Cekcyn, within Tuchola County, Kuyavian-Pomeranian Voivodeship, in north-central Poland.
