= Lisiny, Gmina Cekcyn =

Lisiny
- Village
- Location within Poland
- Coordinates: 53°32′51″N 18°9′33″E
- Country: Poland
- Voivodeship: Kuyavian-Pomeranian
- County: Tuchola
- Gmina: Cekcyn
- Population: 30

Lisiny [liˈɕinɨ] is a village in the administrative district of Gmina Cekcyn, within Tuchola County, Kuyavian-Pomeranian Voivodeship, in north-central Poland.
