= Gmina Cekcyn =

Gmina Cekcyn Cekcyn Commune
- Gmina
- Coat of arms
- Interactive map of Gmina Cekcyn
- Coordinates (Cekcyn): 53°34′22″N 18°0′36″E
- Country: Poland
- Voivodeship: Kuyavian-Pomeranian
- County: Tuchola
- Seat: Cekcyn

Area
  - Total: 253.32 km^{2} (97.81 sq mi)

Population (2006)
  - Total: 6,437
  - Density: 25.41/km^{2} (65.81/sq mi)
- Website: http://www.cekcyn.pl

Gmina Cekcyn is a rural gmina (administrative district) in Tuchola County, Kuyavian-Pomeranian Voivodeship, in north-central Poland. Its seat is the village of Cekcyn, which lies approximately 11 kilometres (7 mi) east of Tuchola and 51 km (32 mi) north of Bydgoszcz.

The gmina covers an area of 253.32 square kilometres (97.8 sq mi), and as of 2006 its total population is 6,437.

The gmina contains part of the protected areas of Tuchola Landscape Park and Wda Landscape Park.

== Villages ==
Gmina Cekcyn contains the villages and settlements of Bieszewo, Błądzim, Błądzim-Dworzec, Brzozie, Cekcyn, Cekcynek, Dębowiec, Gołąbek, Huta, Iwiec, Jelenia Góra, Karpaty, Kiełpiński Most, Knieja, Kosowo, Kowalskie Błota, Kruszka, Krzywogoniec, Lisiny, Łosiny, Lubiewice, Lubińsk, Ludwichowo, Madera, Mała Huta, Małe Budziska, Małe Gacno, Mikołajskie, Nowy Sumin, Okiersk, Okoninek, Ostrowo, Piła-Młyn, Plaskorz, Pustelnia, Rudzki Młyn, Sarnówek, Siwe Bagno, Skrajna, Sławno, Sowiniec, Stary Sumin, Stary Wierzchucin, Suchom, Świt, Szczuczanek, Szklana Huta, Trzebciny, Wielkie Budziska, Wielkie Gacno, Wielkie Koralskie Błota, Wierzchlas, Wierzchucin, Wrzosowisko, Wysoka, Zalesie, Zamarte, Zdroje and Zielonka.

== Neighbouring gminas ==
Gmina Cekcyn is bordered by the gminas of Gostycyn, Lniano, Lubiewo, Osie, Śliwice and Tuchola.
