= Lubiewo, Kuyavian-Pomeranian Voivodeship =

Lubiewo
- Village
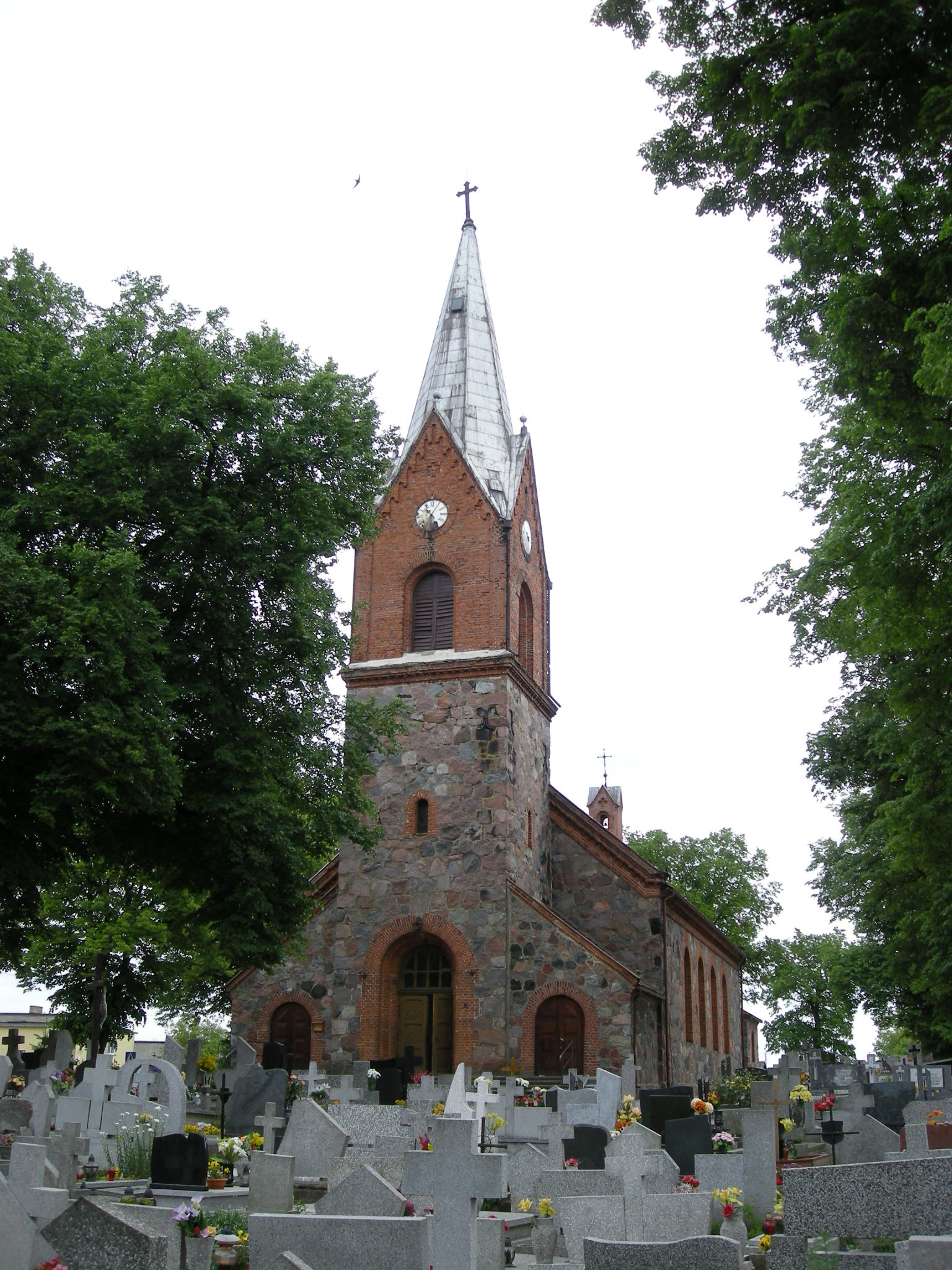
- Church of Saint Nicholas

- Location within Poland
- Coordinates: 53°28′1″N 18°1′6″E
- Country: Poland
- Voivodeship: Kuyavian-Pomeranian
- County: Tuchola
- Gmina: Lubiewo

Population
  - Total: 1,012

Lubiewo (Polish pronunciation: [luˈbjɛvɔ]) is a village in Tuchola County, Kuyavian-Pomeranian Voivodeship, in north-central Poland. It is the seat of the gmina (administrative district) called Gmina Lubiewo.
