= Cekcyn =

- Village
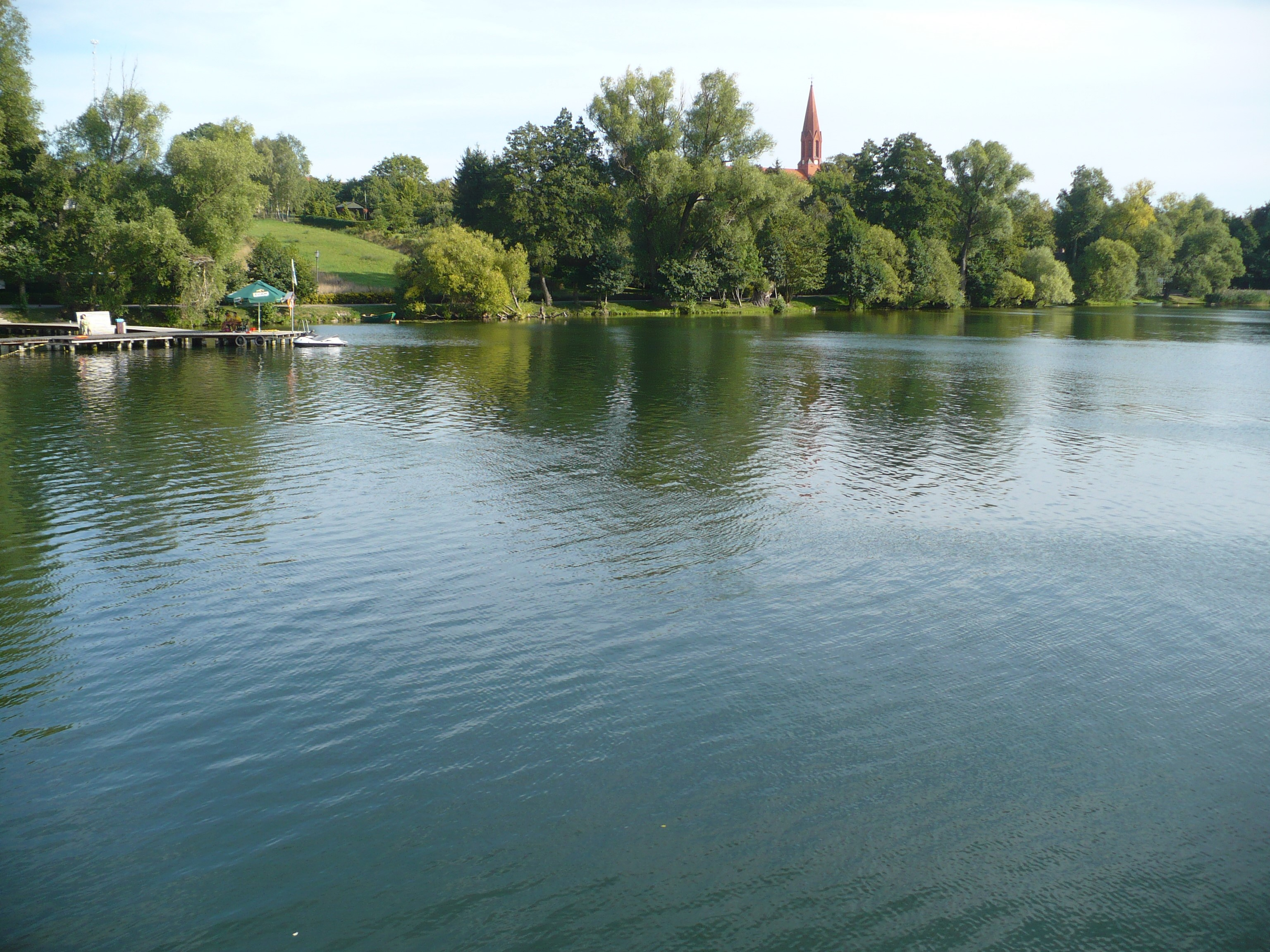
- Cekcyn and the Wielkie Cekcyńskie Lake

- Location within Poland
- Coordinates: 53°34′22″N 18°0′36″E
- Country: Poland
- Voivodeship: Kuyavian-Pomeranian
- County: Tuchola
- Gmina: Cekcyn

Population
  - Total: 1,710
- Time zone: UTC+1 (CET)
  - Summer (DST): UTC+2 (CEST)
- Vehicle registration: CTU

Cekcyn (Polish pronunciation: [ˈt͡sɛkt͡sɨn]) is a village in Tuchola County, Kuyavian-Pomeranian Voivodeship, in north-central Poland. It is the seat of the gmina (administrative district) called Gmina Cekcyn.

Cekcyn is located in the middle of the Tuchola Forest (Bory Tucholskie) in historic Pomerania. Around the buildings there are few lakes with the biggest one - Wielkie Jezioro Cekcyńskie. The word 'bory' means woods riddled with conifers, mainly pines. Visitors admit the pine forests are everywhere around. One of the most recognizable buildings in the centre is a Gothic Revival church, erected in 1869. During summer vacation there is a very important event for the whole community. It is the holiday of administrative district Cekcyn, which has become a new tradition, and a way to promote this village.

== History ==
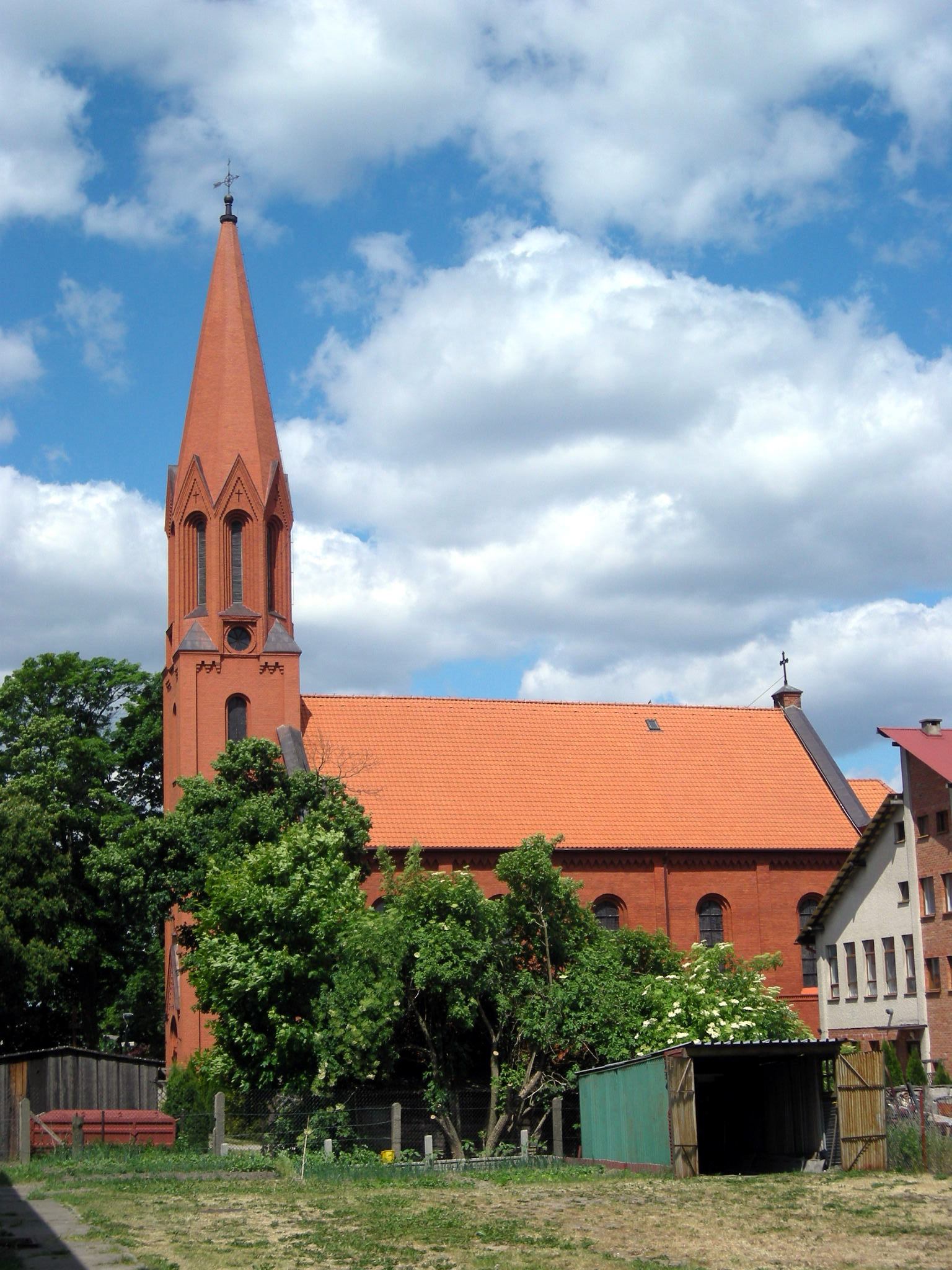
Exaltation of the Holy Cross church

Cekcyn historically was also named Ciechocinek and Ciechocin Polski. In 1301 King Wenceslaus II of Poland enfeoffed the village to his chancellor Piotr Święca. Later on, in the early modern period, it was a royal village of the Polish Crown, administratively located in the Tuchola County in the Pomeranian Voivodeship.

Following the German-Soviet invasion of Poland, which started World War II in September 1939, it was occupied by Germany until 1945. In 1940 and 1943–1944, the Germans carried out expulsions of Poles, whose farms were then handed over to Germans as part of the Lebensraum policy. Three Polish families were enslaved as forced labour to serve Germans in Cekcyn and another nearby village. The local Polish police chief was murdered by the Russians in the Katyn massacre in 1940. In 1942 the Germans renamed the village to Seehaupten to erase traces of Polish origin. After the war the historic name Cekcyn was restored.
