= Jakub Gołąbek =

Polish composer and singer (1739–1789)

Jakub Gołąbek (born 1739 in Silesia, died 30 March 1789 in Kraków) was a Polish composer and singer (tenor).

== Biography ==
The first confirmation of Gołąbek's stay in Kraków is a marriage certificate to Marcjanna Celińska from November 4, 1766, preserved in the parish archives of Wawel Cathedral in Kraków. In 1773, he became a singing teacher at the Jesuit music dormitory in Kraków, headed by Józef Zygmuntowski. As a musician, he was active first in the chapel of the St. Mary's Church, and from around 1774 until the end of his life in the chapel of the Wawel Cathedral, in which he sang and for which he composed. In the years 1781 to 1787 he was a singing teacher at Wacław Sierakowski's music school; he participated in concerts organized by him, including in 1773 at the court of Bishop Kajetan Sołtyk, when Gołąbek's Cantata in Honor of St. Stanislaus was performed.

== Works ==
Gołąbek's music played a significant role in shaping the Polish classical style. It is typical of early classicism, drawing on the style of both Baroque music and the Viennese classics in terms of sonata form, theme structure, treatment of the bass part (basso continuo), and the use of elements of galant style in slow movements (for example, in "Parthia").

== Compositions ==
Based on source materials:

=== Instrumental works ===
- Sinfonia in D for 2 violins, 2 oboes, 2 horns, viola, basso continuo, (ca. 1773)
- Symphonia in D for 2 violins, 2 flutes or oboes, 2 horns, viola, basso continuo
- Symphonia in C for 2 violins, 2 oboes, 2 clarinets, viola, basso continuo
- Symphony in B-flat major for 2 violins, 2 horns, 2 clarinets, viola, basso continuo
- Symphony in D major for 2 violins, 2 flutes, 2 horns, viola, basso continuo
- Parthia in C for 2 horns, 2 clarinets, bassoon

=== Vocal works ===
- 4 masses for 4 voices: C major, F major, C major, E minor
- "Offertorium Veni Sancte Spiritus in D major" for tenor solo, mixed choir, 2 violins, 2 horns, viola, and orchestra
- 4 cantatas for 4 solo voices, choir, and orchestra; to texts by Wacław Sierakowski
  - "Cantata in honor of St. Jacek" (lost music)
  - "Cantata in honor of Blessed Bronisława" (lost music)
  - "Cantata in honor of St. John Cantius" (lost music)
  - "Cantata in honor of St. Stanislaus" (lost music and text)
