= Gmina Śliwice =

Gmina Śliwice Śliwice Commune
- Gmina
- Coat of arms
- Interactive map of Gmina Śliwice
- Coordinates (Śliwice): 53°42′41″N 18°10′38″E
- Country: Poland
- Voivodeship: Kuyavian-Pomeranian
- County: Tuchola
- Seat: Śliwice

Area
  - Total: 174.75 km^{2} (67.47 sq mi)

Population (2006)
  - Total: 5,430
  - Density: 31.1/km^{2} (80.5/sq mi)
- Website: http://www.sliwice.las.pl

Gmina Śliwice is a rural gmina (administrative district) in Tuchola County, Kuyavian-Pomeranian Voivodeship, in north-central Poland. Its seat is the village of Śliwice, which lies approximately 25 kilometres (16 mi) north-east of Tuchola and 68 km (42 mi) north of Bydgoszcz.

The gmina covers an area of 174.75 square kilometres (67.5 sq mi), and as of 2006 its total population is 5,430.

The gmina contains part of the protected area called Tuchola Landscape Park.

== Villages ==
Gmina Śliwice contains the villages and settlements of Brzeźno, Brzozowe Błota, Byłyczek, Główka, Krąg, Laski, Łąski Piec, Linówek, Lińsk, Lipowa, Lisiny, Lubocień, Okoniny, Okoniny Nadjeziorne, Rosochatka, Śliwice, Śliwiczki and Zwierzyniec.

== Neighbouring gminas ==
Gmina Śliwice is bordered by the gminas of Cekcyn, Czersk, Osie, Osieczna, Osiek and Tuchola.
