= Tuchola County =

Tuchola County Powiat tucholski
- County
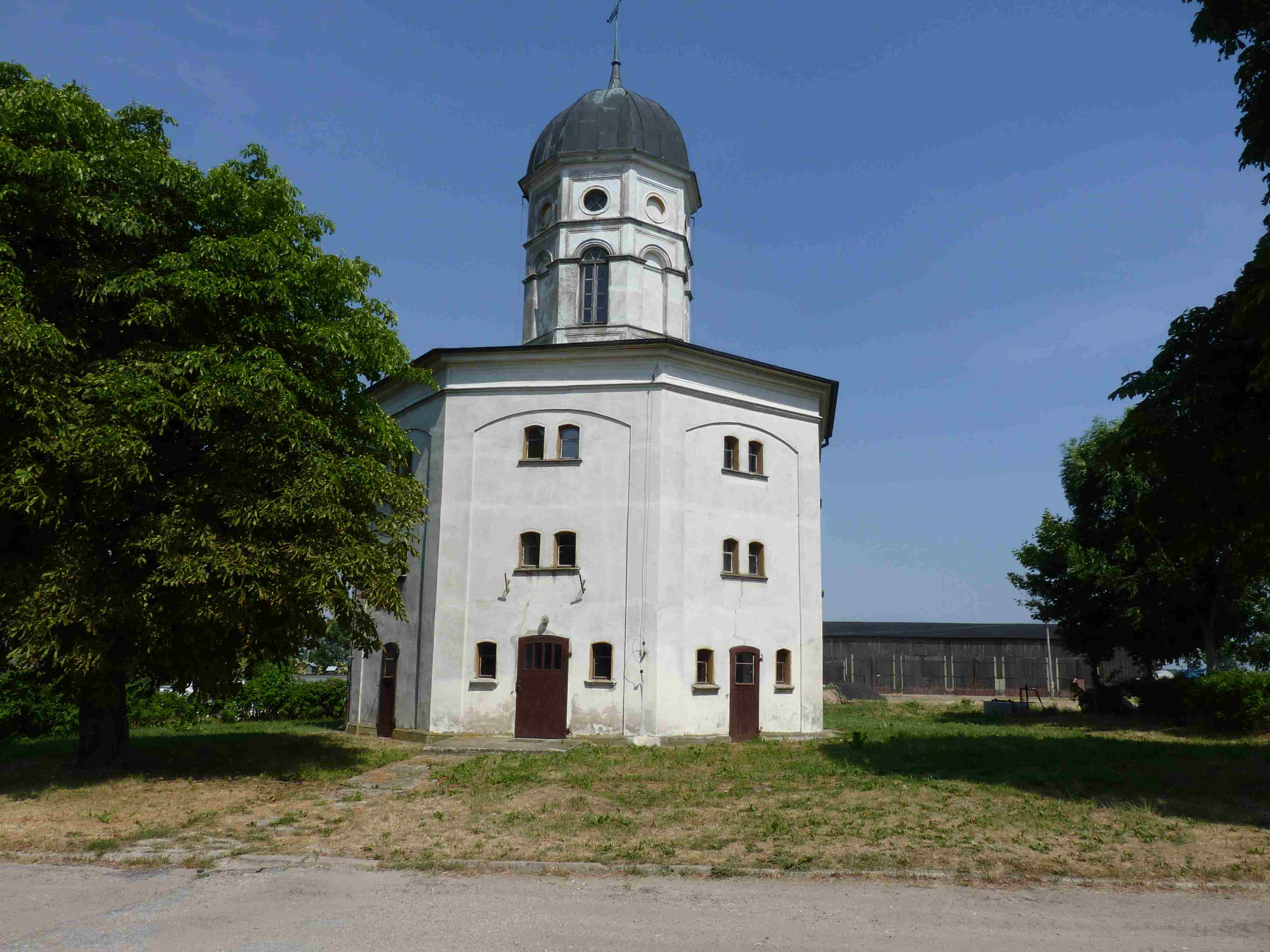

- Flag Coat of arms

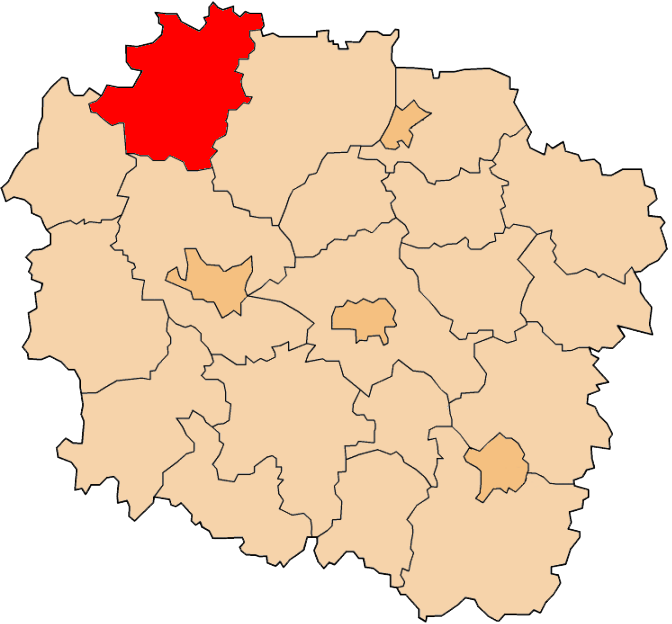
- Location within the voivodeship

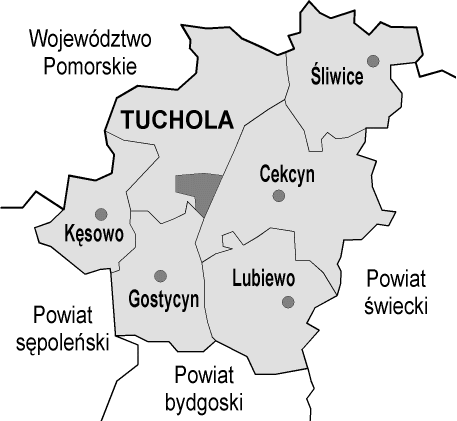
- Division into gminas
- Coordinates (Tuchola): 53°36′N 17°51′E
- Country: Poland
- Voivodeship: Kuyavian-Pomeranian
- Seat: Tuchola
- Gminas: Total 6: Gmina Cekcyn; Gmina Gostycyn; Gmina Kęsowo; Gmina Lubiewo; Gmina Śliwice; Gmina Tuchola

Area
  - Total: 1,075.27 km^{2} (415.16 sq mi)

Population (2019)
  - Total: 48,329
  - Density: 44.946/km^{2} (116.41/sq mi)
  - Urban: 13,621
  - Rural: 34,708
- Car plates: CTU
- Website: www.powiat.tuchola.pl

Tuchola County (Polish: powiat tucholski) is a unit of territorial administration and local government (powiat) in Kuyavian-Pomeranian Voivodeship, north-central Poland. It came into being on 1 January 1999 as a result of the Polish local government reforms passed in 1998. Its administrative seat and only town is Tuchola, which lies 55 km (34 mi) north of Bydgoszcz and 81 km (50 mi) north-west of Toruń.

The county covers an area of 1,075.27 square kilometres (415.2 sq mi). As of 2019 its total population is 48,329 out of which the population of Tuchola is 13,621 and the rural population is 34,708.

The county contains most of the protected area called Tuchola Landscape Park.

== Neighbouring counties ==
Tuchola County is bordered by Starogard County to the north-east, Świecie County to the east, Bydgoszcz County to the south, Sępólno County to the south-west and Chojnice County to the west.

== Administrative divisions ==
The county is subdivided into six gminas (one urban-rural and five rural). These are listed in the following table, in descending order of population.

Gmina	Type	Area (km^{2})	Population (2019)	Seat
Gmina Tuchola	urban-rural	239.4	20,270	Tuchola
Gmina Cekcyn	rural	253.3	6,842	Cekcyn
Gmina Lubiewo	rural	162.8	5,995	Lubiewo
Gmina Śliwice	rural	174.8	5,580	Śliwice
Gmina Gostycyn	rural	136.2	5,166	Gostycyn
Gmina Kęsowo	rural	108.8	4,476	Kęsowo
