= Nowa Tuchola =

- Village
- Location within Poland
- Coordinates: 53°34′50″N 17°50′18″E
- Country: Poland
- Voivodeship: Kuyavian-Pomeranian
- County: Tuchola
- Gmina: Tuchola
- Population: 110
- Time zone: UTC+1 (CET)
  - Summer (DST): UTC+2 (CEST)
- Vehicle registration: CTU

Nowa Tuchola ([ˈnɔva tuˈxɔla]; German: Neu Tuchel, 1942-45 Neutuchel) is a settlement, part of the village of Mały Mędromierz in the administrative district of Gmina Tuchola, within Tuchola County, Kuyavian-Pomeranian Voivodeship, in north-central Poland.

== Geographical location ==
Nowa Tuchola lies approximately 3 kilometres (2 mi) south of Tuchola, 25 km (16 mi) south-east of Chojnice and 53 km (33 mi) north of Bydgoszcz.

== History ==
The region formed part of Poland until its annexation by Prussia in the First Partition of Poland in 1772. The village has emerged from a rural colony founded on the terrain of a former crown-land type of farm steading administered by the Prussian royal domain office of Tuchola (German: Königliches Domänenamt Tuchel) which around 1789 controlled four domains and 123 villages. The foundation of the village dates back to the last quarter of the 18th century; already at that time the village had also a Jewish school. In a list of all towns and villages of Prussia compiled around 1849, the settlement of Nowa Tuchola as Neu-Tuchel (meaning "New Tuchola") is described as a `village of parcel owners´ (German: Parzellistendorf).

The history of the village is similar to the history of the neighbouring town of Tuchola (Tuchel within the Prussian Partition). Around the end of the third quarter of the 19th century both places belonged to Kreis Konitz in the administrative district of Regierungsbezirk Marienwerder of the Province of Prussia within the Kingdom of Prussia, and from 1871 within the German Empire. In 1863 and 1869 the land-registry office was located in Tuchel. In 1868 the Catholics and Protestants of the village both belonged to their respective parishes in Tuchola. Because of population growth in Prussia, in 1875 the new Kreis Tuchel was formed, of which Neu-Tuchel became part. In 1878 the Province of Prussia was sub-divided into the Province of West Prussia and the Province of East Prussia, and since then the village belonged to West Prussia. In 1894 the county court and post office appertaining to Neu-Tuchel were located in Tuchel.

When on 10 January 1920 the regulations of the Treaty of Versailles became effective, the village together with the former Kreis Tuchel became part of the Second Polish Republic, which regained independence after World War I.

=== Second World War ===
Following the joint German-Soviet invasion of Poland, which started World War II in September 1939, the village was occupied by Germany. On September 30, 1939, members of the German minority from Selbstschutz committed a massacre of 48 people in the village, including two Poles and 46 Jews. The victims were brought also from neighbouring villages. Among the Germans following names were identified: Helmut Bratsch, Hans Briske, Walter Klos, Kurt Merten-Feddler and Willy Müller. Concerning the same incident, according to another source, in connection with suspicion of arson at least 45 Poles were killed on 24 October, i.e. more than two weeks after the invasion of Poland had ended on October 6, 1939. On November 26, 1939, Nowa Tuchola was annexed into the newly formed province of Reichsgau Danzig-West Prussia – in the new administrative district of Regierungsbezirk Bromberg.

After the end of the war the village was restored to Poland, although with a Soviet-installed communist regime, which stayed in power until the Fall of Communism in the 1980s.

=== Number of inhabitants by year ===
Year	Number	Remarks
1865	410	in 42 private dwelling houses, incl. 262 Catholics and 142 Protestants
1885	556	
2008	110	
