= Klocek =

Klocek is a surname. Notable people with the surname include:

- Ewelina Klocek (born 1987), Polish athlete
- Stanisław Klocek (born 1955), Polish ice hockey player
- Thomas E. Klocek, American academic

== See also ==
- Klocek, Poland
- Kloek
