= Jesionowo =

Jesionowo may refer to the following places:

- Jesionowo, Kuyavian-Pomeranian Voivodeship (north-central Poland)
- Jesionowo, Braniewo County in Warmian-Masurian Voivodeship (north Poland)
- Jesionowo, Olsztyn County in Warmian-Masurian Voivodeship (north Poland)
- Jesionowo, West Pomeranian Voivodeship (north-west Poland)
