= Stegny (disambiguation) =

Stegny is a neighbourhood in the Mokotów district of Warsaw.

Stegny may also refer to:

- Stegny, Kuyavian-Pomeranian Voivodeship
- Stegny, Warmian-Masurian Voivodeship
