= Wiśniówka =

Wiśniówka may refer to the following:

== Places ==
- Wiśniówka, Kuyavian-Pomeranian Voivodeship (north-central Poland)
- Wiśniówka, Lublin Voivodeship (east Poland)
- Wiśniówka, Świętokrzyskie Voivodeship (south-central Poland)
- Wiśniówka, Pomeranian Voivodeship (north Poland)

== Other ==
- Wisniowka (liqueur) - a beverage made from cherries; aka wiśniówka
