= Koślinka, Kuyavian-Pomeranian Voivodeship =

Koślinka
- Village
- Location within Poland
- Coordinates: 53°43′33″N 17°59′0″E
- Country: Poland
- Voivodeship: Kuyavian-Pomeranian
- County: Tuchola
- Gmina: Tuchola

Koślinka ([kɔˈɕlinka]; German: Koslinka) is a village in the administrative district of Gmina Tuchola, within Tuchola County, Kuyavian-Pomeranian Voivodeship, in north-central Poland.
