= Słupy, Tuchola County =

Słupy
- Village
- Location within Poland
- Coordinates: 53°36′N 17°48′E
- Country: Poland
- Voivodeship: Kuyavian-Pomeranian
- County: Tuchola
- Gmina: Tuchola
- Time zone: UTC+1 (CET)
  - Summer (DST): UTC+2 (CEST)
- Vehicle registration: CTU

Słupy ([ˈswupɨ]; German: Sluppi, 1942-45 Pfahldorf) is a village in the administrative district of Gmina Tuchola, within Tuchola County, Kuyavian-Pomeranian Voivodeship, in north-central Poland. It is located in the historic region of Pomerania.

Słupy was a royal village of the Polish Crown, administratively located in the Tuchola County in the Pomeranian Voivodeship.
