= Wysoka Wieś, Kuyavian-Pomeranian Voivodeship =

Wysoka Wieś
- Village
- Location within Poland
- Coordinates: 53°33′40″N 17°50′45″E
- Country: Poland
- Voivodeship: Kuyavian-Pomeranian
- County: Tuchola
- Gmina: Tuchola
- Population: 110

Wysoka Wieś ([vɨˈsɔka ˈvjɛɕ]; German: Hochdorf) is a village in the administrative district of Gmina Tuchola, within Tuchola County, Kuyavian-Pomeranian Voivodeship, in north-central Poland.
