= Pod Komorzą =

- Village
- Location within Poland
- Coordinates: 53°38′46″N 17°49′20″E
- Country: Poland
- Voivodeship: Kuyavian-Pomeranian
- County: Tuchola
- Gmina: Tuchola
- Population: 100

Pod Komorzą [ˈpɔt kɔˈmɔʐɔ̃] is a village in the administrative district of Gmina Tuchola, within Tuchola County, Kuyavian-Pomeranian Voivodeship, in north-central Poland.
