= Fojutowo =

- Village
- Location within Poland
- Coordinates: 53°43′28″N 17°54′3″E
- Country: Poland
- Voivodeship: Kuyavian-Pomeranian
- County: Tuchola
- Gmina: Tuchola

Fojutowo [fɔjuˈtɔvɔ] is a village in the administrative district of Gmina Tuchola, within Tuchola County, Kuyavian-Pomeranian Voivodeship, in north-central Poland.
