= Za Jeziorem =

- Village
- Location within Poland
- Coordinates: 53°41′15″N 17°56′20″E
- Country: Poland
- Voivodeship: Kuyavian-Pomeranian
- County: Tuchola
- Gmina: Tuchola
- Population: 0

Za Jeziorem [ˈza jɛˈʑɔrɛm] ("behind the lake") is a former settlement in the administrative district of Gmina Tuchola, within Tuchola County, Kuyavian-Pomeranian Voivodeship, in north-central Poland.
