= Nadolnik, Kuyavian-Pomeranian Voivodeship =

Nadolnik
- Village
- Location within Poland
- Coordinates: 53°41′9″N 17°50′12″E
- Country: Poland
- Voivodeship: Kuyavian-Pomeranian
- County: Tuchola
- Gmina: Tuchola
- Population: 53

Nadolnik ([naˈdɔlnik];German: Niedermühl) is a village in the administrative district of Gmina Tuchola, within Tuchola County, Kuyavian-Pomeranian Voivodeship, in north-central Poland.
