= Huby, Kuyavian-Pomeranian Voivodeship =

Huby
- Village
- Location within Poland
- Coordinates: 53°33′25″N 17°49′55″E
- Country: Poland
- Voivodeship: Kuyavian-Pomeranian
- County: Tuchola
- Gmina: Tuchola
- Population: 56

Huby [ˈxubɨ] is a village in the administrative district of Gmina Tuchola, within Tuchola County, Kuyavian-Pomeranian Voivodeship, in north-central Poland.
