= Rzepiczna =

- Village
- Location within Poland
- Coordinates: 53°43′N 18°0′E
- Country: Poland
- Voivodeship: Kuyavian-Pomeranian
- County: Tuchola
- Gmina: Tuchola

Rzepiczna ([ʐɛˈpit͡ʂna]; German: Repitz) is a village in the administrative district of Gmina Tuchola, within Tuchola County, Kuyavian-Pomeranian Voivodeship, in north-central Poland.
