= Dziekcz =

- Village
- Location within Poland
- Coordinates: 53°41′1″N 17°51′45″E
- Country: Poland
- Voivodeship: Kuyavian-Pomeranian
- County: Tuchola
- Gmina: Tuchola
- Population: 51

Dziekcz ([d͡ʑɛkt͡ʂ]; German: Dzeks) is a village in the administrative district of Gmina Tuchola, within Tuchola County, Kuyavian-Pomeranian Voivodeship, in north-central Poland.
