= Kreis Tuchel =

Province of West Prussia (1913) Regierungsbezirk Danzig Regierungsbezirk Marienwerder

The Tuchel district was a Prussian district in Germany that existed from 1875 to 1920. It was in the part of West Prussia that fell to Poland after World War I through the Treaty of Versailles. Its capital was Tuchel.

== History ==
The area of the Tuchel district was annexed by the Kingdom of Prussia through the First Partition of Poland in 1772 and was part of the Konitz district. On 30 April 1815, the area became part of the new administrative region of Marienwerder in the province of West Prussia. From 3 December 1829 to 1 April 1878, West Prussia and East Prussia were united to form the Province of Prussia, which had belonged to the German Reich since 1871.

Due to the steady population growth in the 19th century, several districts proved to be too large and a reduction in size was necessary. Therefore, in 1875, the new Tuchel district was created from parts of the Konitz district. The district office was set up in the town of Tuchel (Tuchola). As a result of the Versailles Treaty, the district had to be ceded by Germany to Poland on 10 January 1920.

== Demographics ==
The Tuchel district had a majority Polish population with a significant German minority.

Ethnolinguistic structure of Kreis Tuchel
Year	Population	German		Polish / Bilingual / Other	
1905	30,803	9,925	32.2%	20,878	67.8%
1910	33,951	11,265	33.2%	22,686	66.8%

== Politics ==
=== District administrators ===
- 1879–1885: Ludwig Blümke
- 1885–1891: Clemens von Delbrück
- 1891–1895: Ernst Reinhold Gerhard von Glasenapp
- 1895–1904: Emil Venske
- 1904–1914: Richard von Puttkamer
- 1914–1919: Hugo Tortilowicz von Batocki-Friebe

=== Elections ===
In the German Empire, the Tuchel district together with the Konitz district formed the Reichstag constituency of Marienwerder 6. This constituency was won by candidates from the Polish Party in all elections to the Reichstag between 1871 and 1912.

== Municipalities ==
In 1912, the Tuchel district included the town of Tuchel and 54 rural communities:

- Alt Summin
- Bagnitz
- Bialla
- Bladau
- Brohse
- Drausnitz
- Dzeks
- Glowka
- Groß Bislaw
- Groß Budzisk
- Groß Gatzno
- Groß Mangelmühle
- Groß Schliewitz
- Hoheneiben
- Iwitz
- Jablonka
- Jehlenz
- Kamionka
- Kamnitz
- Kelpin
- Klein Bislaw
- Klein Gatzno
- Klein Klonia
- Klein Mangelmühle
- Klein Schliewitz
- Klonowo
- Klotzek
- Koslinka
- Krong
- Krummstadt
- Liebenau
- Lissinni
- Luboczyn
- Minikowo
- Neu Summin
- Neu Tuchel
- Nikolaiken
- Okiersk
- Okonin am Walde
- Ostrowo
- Pantau
- Petztin
- Plassowo
- Polnisch Cekzin
- Prust
- Przyrowo
- Reetz
- Rosochatka
- Repnitz
- Sehlen
- Sluppi
- Stobno
- Trutnowo
- Tuchel, town
- Zwangsbruch

== Landkreis Tuchel in occupied Poland (1939–1945) ==
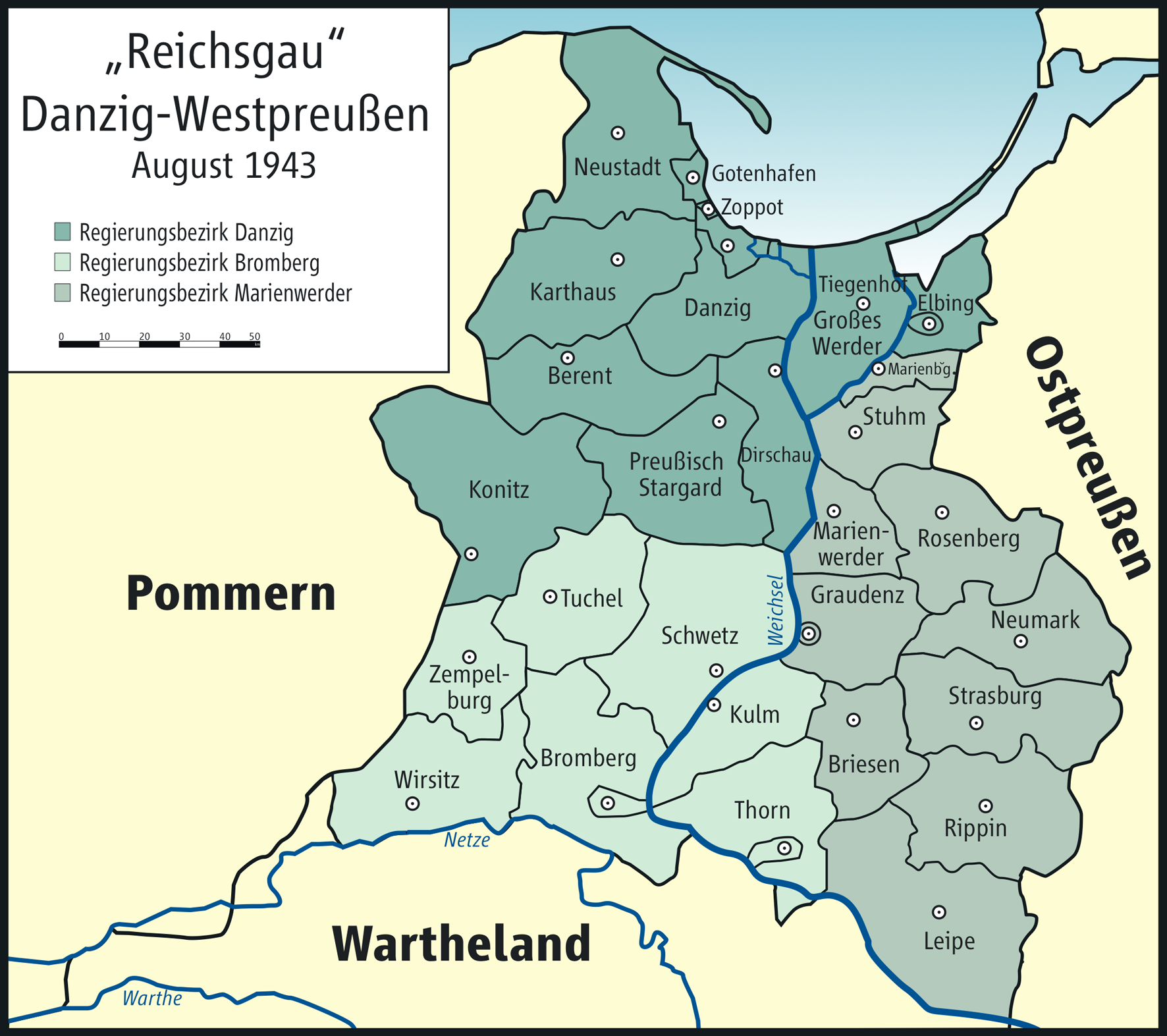
Danzig-West Prussia (1943)

=== History ===
After the German invasion of Poland, the district became part of the newly formed Reichsgau Danzig-West Prussia – in the administrative region of Bromberg. The town of Tuchel was subject to the German municipal code of 30 January 1935, which was valid in the Altreich and provided for the implementation of the Führerprinzip at the municipal level.

=== Place names ===
On 25 June 1942 all place names were Germanized. Either the name from 1918 was retained or – if "not German" enough – acoustically adjusted or translated, for example:

- Bralewitz → Wilhelmsflur
- Drausnitz → Drausnest
- Groß Bislaw → Bislau
- Groß Klonia → Klehnboden
- Groß Komorze → Waldkammer
- Kamionka → Heidefließ
- Klein Bislaw → Bislauheim
- Lubotschin → Laub
- Przyrowo → Christinenfelde
- Stobno → Stöbensee
