= Raciąski Młyn =

- Village
- Location within Poland
- Coordinates: 53°40′30″N 17°46′52″E
- Country: Poland
- Voivodeship: Kuyavian-Pomeranian
- County: Tuchola
- Gmina: Tuchola
- Population: 16

Raciąski Młyn ([raˈt͡ɕɔ̃ski ˈmwɨn]; German: Reetzermühle) is a village in the administrative district of Gmina Tuchola, within Tuchola County, Kuyavian-Pomeranian Voivodeship, in north-central Poland.
