= Barłogi, Kuyavian-Pomeranian Voivodeship =

Barłogi
- Village
- Location within Poland
- Coordinates: 53°42′1″N 17°59′49″E
- Country: Poland
- Voivodeship: Kuyavian-Pomeranian
- County: Tuchola
- Gmina: Tuchola
- Time zone: UTC+1 (CET)
  - Summer (DST): UTC+2 (CEST)
- Vehicle registration: CTU

Barłogi ([barˈwɔɡi]; German: Barlogi) is a village in the administrative district of Gmina Tuchola, within Tuchola County, Kuyavian-Pomeranian Voivodeship, in north-central Poland.

Four Polish citizens were murdered by Nazi Germany in the village during World War II.
