= Wielka Komorza =

- Village
- Location within Poland
- Coordinates: 53°38′52″N 17°53′6″E
- Country: Poland
- Voivodeship: Kuyavian-Pomeranian
- County: Tuchola
- Gmina: Tuchola
- Population: 230

Wielka Komorza ([ˈvjɛlka kɔˈmɔʐa]; German: Groß Komorze, 1942-45 Waldkammer) is a village in the administrative district of Gmina Tuchola, within Tuchola County, Kuyavian-Pomeranian Voivodeship, in north-central Poland.
