= Pod Lasem, Kuyavian-Pomeranian Voivodeship =

Pod Lasem
- Village
- Location within Poland
- Coordinates: 53°37′58″N 17°54′8″E
- Country: Poland
- Voivodeship: Kuyavian-Pomeranian
- County: Tuchola
- Gmina: Tuchola
- Population: 31

Pod Lasem [ˈpɔt ˈlasɛm] is a village in the administrative district of Gmina Tuchola, within Tuchola County, Kuyavian-Pomeranian Voivodeship, in north-central Poland.
