= Legbąd =

- Village
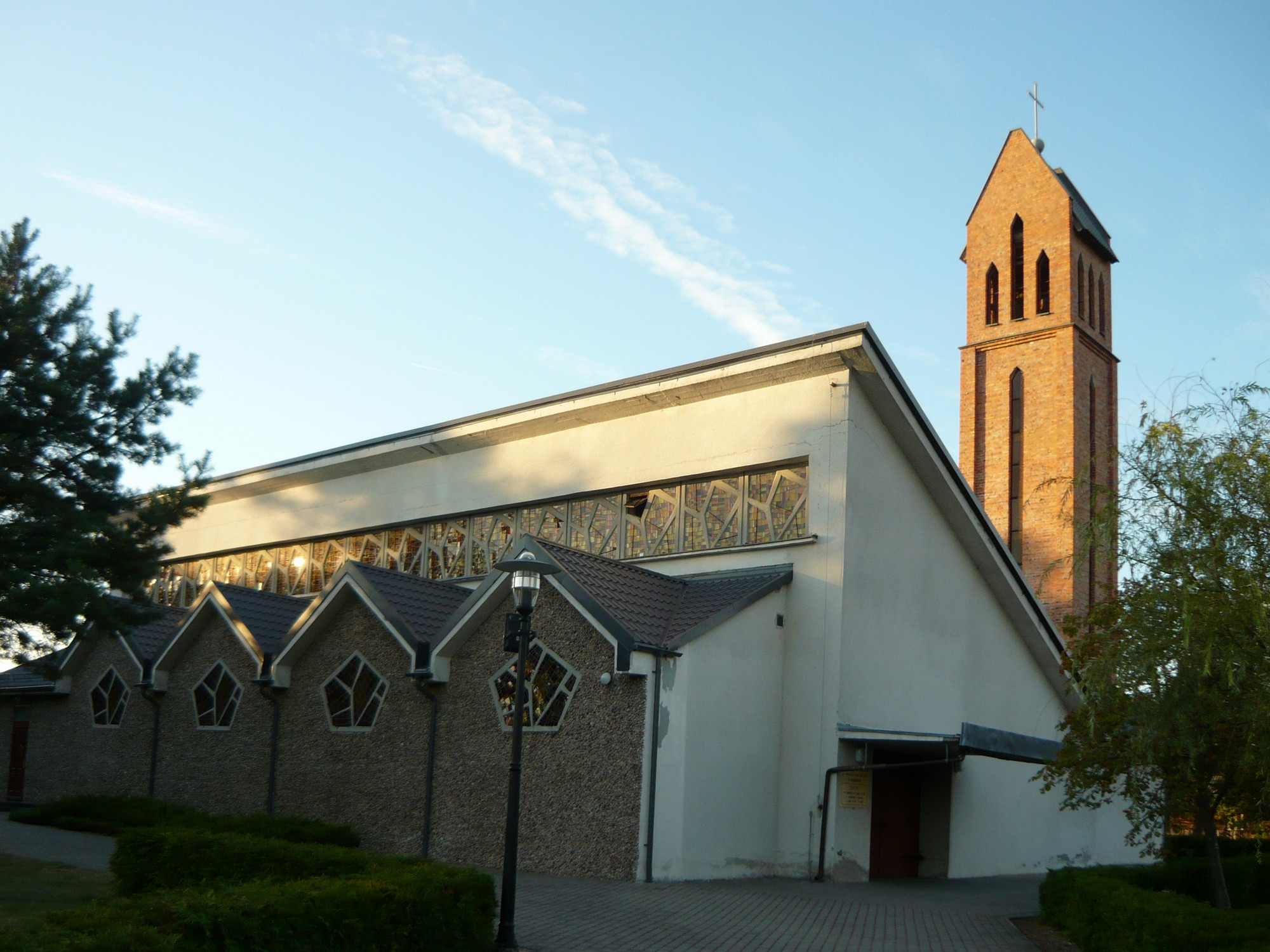
- Sacred Heart church in Legbąd

- Location within Poland
- Coordinates: 53°42′36″N 17°56′27″E
- Country: Poland
- Voivodeship: Kuyavian-Pomeranian
- County: Tuchola
- Gmina: Tuchola
- Population: 470
- Time zone: UTC+1 (CET)
  - Summer (DST): UTC+2 (CEST)
- Vehicle registration: CTU

Legbąd (Polish pronunciation: [ˈlɛɡbɔnt]; German: Legbond) is a village in the administrative district of Gmina Tuchola, within Tuchola County, Kuyavian-Pomeranian Voivodeship, in north-central Poland. It is located within the historic region of Pomerania.

== History ==
Legbąd was a royal village of the Polish Crown, administratively located in the Tuchola County in the Pomeranian Voivodeship.

During the German occupation of Poland (World War II), in 1942–1944, the Germans carried out expulsions of Poles, who were initially held in the Potulice concentration camp, and some were then deported to forced labour in Germany, while their farms were handed over to German colonists as part of the Lebensraum policy.

== Notable residents ==
- Helga M. Novak (1935–2013), German-Icelandic writer
