= Mała Komorza =

- Village
- Location within Poland
- Coordinates: 53°38′47″N 17°51′38″E
- Country: Poland
- Voivodeship: Kuyavian-Pomeranian
- County: Tuchola
- Gmina: Tuchola
- Population: 100

Mała Komorza ([ˈmawa kɔˈmɔʐa]; German: Klein Komorze, 1942-45 Kammergut) is a village in the administrative district of Gmina Tuchola, within Tuchola County, Kuyavian-Pomeranian Voivodeship, in north-central Poland.
