= Wysoka, Gmina Tuchola =

Wysoka
- Village
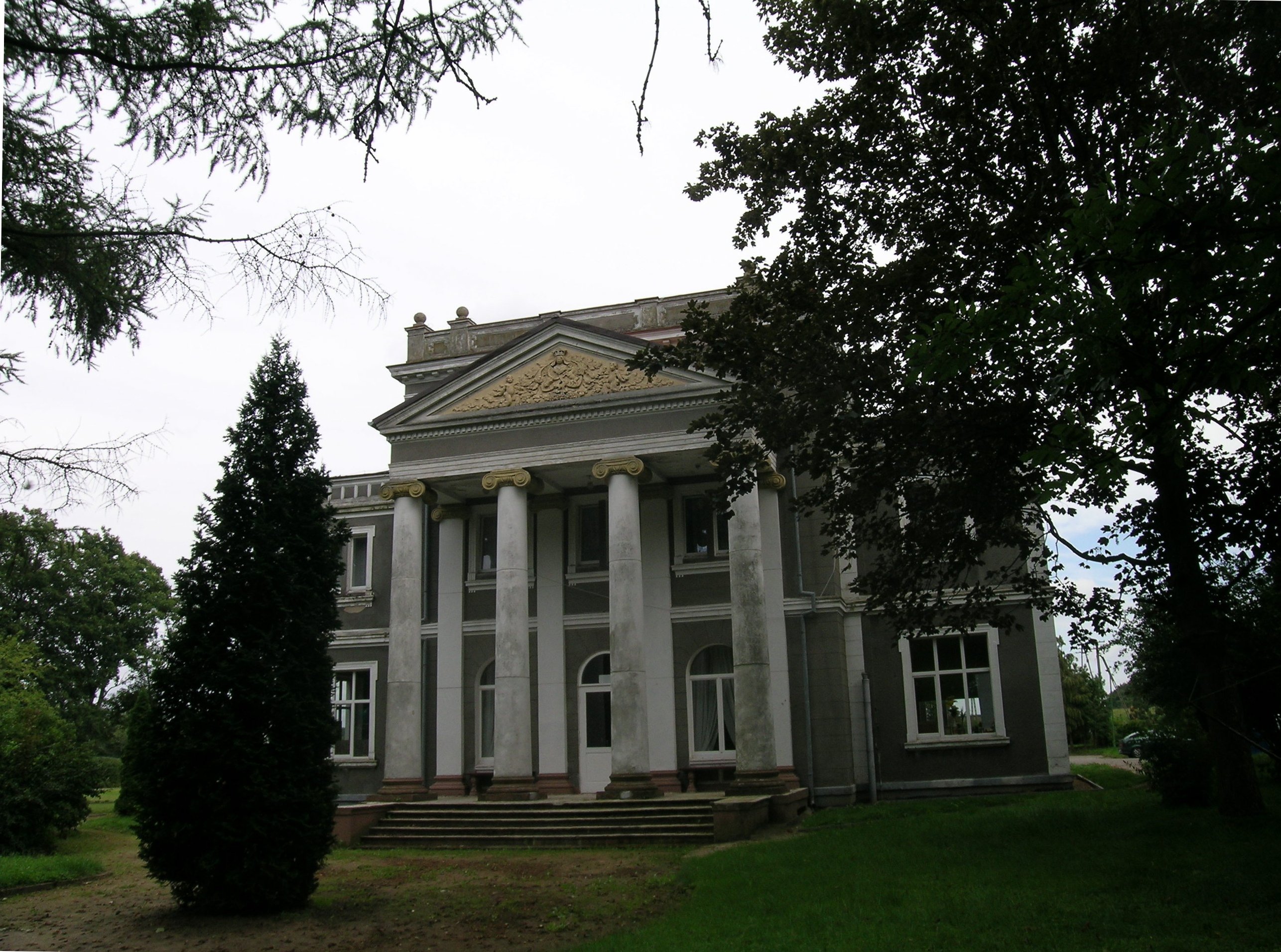

- Location within Poland
- Coordinates: 53°40′16″N 17°44′51″E
- Country: Poland
- Voivodeship: Kuyavian-Pomeranian
- County: Tuchola
- Gmina: Tuchola

Wysoka ([vɨˈsɔka]; German: Wittstock) is a village in the administrative district of Gmina Tuchola, within Tuchola County, Kuyavian-Pomeranian Voivodeship, in north-central Poland.
