= Zielonka, Gmina Tuchola =

Zielonka
- Village
- Location within Poland
- Coordinates: 53°39′47″N 17°55′53″E
- Country: Poland
- Voivodeship: Kuyavian-Pomeranian
- County: Tuchola
- Gmina: Tuchola

Zielonka [ʑɛˈlɔŋka] is a village in the administrative district of Gmina Tuchola, within Tuchola County, Kuyavian-Pomeranian Voivodeship, in north-central Poland.
