= Niwki, Tuchola County =

Niwki
- Village
- Location within Poland
- Coordinates: 53°43′22″N 17°56′00″E
- Country: Poland
- Voivodeship: Kuyavian-Pomeranian
- County: Tuchola
- Gmina: Tuchola
- Population: 134

Niwki [ˈnifki] is a village in the administrative district of Gmina Tuchola, within Tuchola County, Kuyavian-Pomeranian Voivodeship, in north-central Poland.
