= Borki, Tuchola County =

Borki
- Village
- Location within Poland
- Coordinates: 53°39′53″N 17°49′31″E
- Country: Poland
- Voivodeship: Kuyavian-Pomeranian
- County: Tuchola
- Gmina: Tuchola

Borki [ˈbɔrki] is a village in the administrative district of Gmina Tuchola, within Tuchola County, Kuyavian-Pomeranian Voivodeship, in north central Poland.
