= Gmina Tuchola =

Gmina Tuchola Tuchola Commune
- Gmina
- Flag Coat of arms
- Interactive map of Gmina Tuchola
- Coordinates (Tuchola): 53°36′N 17°51′E
- Country: Poland
- Voivodeship: Kuyavian-Pomeranian
- County: Tuchola
- Seat: Tuchola

Area
  - Total: 239.43 km^{2} (92.44 sq mi)

Population (2006)
  - Total: 20,076
  - Density: 83.849/km^{2} (217.17/sq mi)
  - Urban: 13,935
  - Rural: 6,141
- Website: https://www.tuchola.pl

Gmina Tuchola is an urban-rural gmina (administrative district) in Tuchola County, Kuyavian-Pomeranian Voivodeship, in north-central Poland. Its seat is the town of Tuchola, which lies approximately 55 kilometres (34 mi) north of Bydgoszcz.

The gmina covers an area of 239.43 square kilometres (92.4 sq mi), and as of 2006 its total population is 20,076 (out of which the population of Tuchola amounts to 13,935, and the population of the rural part of the gmina is 6,141).

The gmina contains part of the protected area called Tuchola Landscape Park.

== Villages ==
Apart from the town of Tuchola, Gmina Tuchola contains the villages and settlements of Barłogi, Biała, Białowieża, Bielska Struga, Bladowo, Bladowo-Wybudowanie, Borki, Brody, Dąbrówka, Dziekcz, Fojutowo, Huby, Jaty, Jesionowo, Kiełpin, Kiełpin-Wymysłowo, Klocek, Końskie Błota, Koślinka, Lasek, Legbąd, Lipce, Łosiny, Lubierzyn, Mała Komorza, Mały Mędromierz, Mrowiniec, Na Polach, Nad Bladówkiem, Nad Kanałem, Nadolna Karczma, Nadolnik, Niwki, Nowa Tuchola, Ostrów, Parcele Legbądzkie, Pod Komorzą, Pod Lasem, Raciąski Młyn, Raciąż, Raciąż-Piaski, Radonek, Rzepiczna, Słupy, Stegny, Stobno, Szosa Bydgoska, Szosa Sępoleńska, Tajwan, Trzcionek, Wielka Komorza, Wiśniówka, Woziwoda, Wybudowanie Raciąskie, Wysocki Młyn, Wysoka, Wysoka Wieś, Za Jeziorem, Zielona Łąka and Zielonka.

== Neighbouring gminas ==
Gmina Tuchola is bordered by the gminas of Cekcyn, Chojnice, Czersk, Gostycyn, Kęsowo and Śliwice.
