= Łosiny, Gmina Tuchola =

Łosiny
- Village
- Location within Poland
- Coordinates: 53°44′29″N 17°55′52″E
- Country: Poland
- Voivodeship: Kuyavian-Pomeranian
- County: Tuchola
- Gmina: Tuchola
- Population: 140

Łosiny ([wɔˈɕinɨ]; German: Lossini, 1942-45 Lossin) is a village in the administrative district of Gmina Tuchola, within Tuchola County, Kuyavian-Pomeranian Voivodeship, in north-central Poland.
