= Raciąż-Piaski =

- Village
- Location within Poland
- Coordinates: 53°40′8″N 17°47′36″E
- Country: Poland
- Voivodeship: Kuyavian-Pomeranian
- County: Tuchola
- Gmina: Tuchola

Raciąż-Piaski (Polish pronunciation: [ˈratɕɔ̃ʂ ˈpjaskʲi]) is a village in the administrative district of Gmina Tuchola, within Tuchola County, Kuyavian-Pomeranian Voivodeship, in north-central Poland.
