= Jaty =

- Village
- Location within Poland
- Coordinates: 53°44′50″N 17°53′40″E
- Country: Poland
- Voivodeship: Kuyavian-Pomeranian
- County: Tuchola
- Gmina: Tuchola

Jaty ([ˈjatɨ]; German: Jatty) is a village in the administrative district of Gmina Tuchola, within Tuchola County, Kuyavian-Pomeranian Voivodeship, in north-central Poland.
