= Nad Bladówkiem =

- Village
- Location within Poland
- Coordinates: 53°36′4″N 17°47′49″E
- Country: Poland
- Voivodeship: Kuyavian-Pomeranian
- County: Tuchola
- Gmina: Tuchola

Nad Bladówkiem [ˌnad blaˈdufkʲɛm] is a village in the administrative district of Gmina Tuchola, within Tuchola County, Kuyavian-Pomeranian Voivodeship, in north-central Poland.
