= Zielona Łąka, Kuyavian-Pomeranian Voivodeship =

Zielona Łąka
- Village
- Location within Poland
- Coordinates: 53°38′19″N 17°57′5″E
- Country: Poland
- Voivodeship: Kuyavian-Pomeranian
- County: Tuchola
- Gmina: Tuchola

Zielona Łąka (Polish: [ʑɛˈlɔna ˈwɔŋka]) is a village in the administrative district of Gmina Tuchola, within Tuchola County, Kuyavian-Pomeranian Voivodeship, in north-central Poland.
