= Białowieża, Tuchola County =

Białowieża
- Village
- Location within Poland
- Coordinates: 53°37′42″N 17°49′49″E
- Country: Poland
- Voivodeship: Kuyavian-Pomeranian
- County: Tuchola
- Gmina: Tuchola

Białowieża ([bjawɔˈvjɛʐa];; German: Bialowierz, 1942-45 Belwers) is a village in the administrative district of Gmina Tuchola, within Tuchola County, Kuyavian-Pomeranian Voivodeship, in north-central Poland.
