= Tajwan, Kuyavian-Pomeranian Voivodeship =

Tajwan
- Village
- Location within Poland
- Coordinates: 53°39′1″N 17°49′47″E
- Country: Poland
- Voivodeship: Kuyavian-Pomeranian
- County: Tuchola
- Gmina: Tuchola

Tajwan [ˈtai̯van] is a hamlet in the administrative district of Gmina Tuchola, within Tuchola County, Kuyavian-Pomeranian Voivodeship, in north-central Poland.
