= Wysocki Młyn =

- Village
- Location within Poland
- Coordinates: 53°40′48″N 17°46′16″E
- Country: Poland
- Voivodeship: Kuyavian-Pomeranian
- County: Tuchola
- Gmina: Tuchola

Wysocki Młyn ([vɨˈsɔt͡ski ˈmwɨn]; German: Wittstockermühle) is a village in the administrative district of Gmina Tuchola, within Tuchola County, Kuyavian-Pomeranian Voivodeship, in north-central Poland.
