= Biała, Kuyavian-Pomeranian Voivodeship =

Biała
- Village
- Location within Poland
- Coordinates: 53°40′44″N 17°58′28″E
- Country: Poland
- Voivodeship: Kuyavian-Pomeranian
- County: Tuchola
- Gmina: Tuchola

Biała ([ˈbjawa]; German: Bialla, 1942-45 Bielen) is a village in the administrative district of Gmina Tuchola, within Tuchola County, Kuyavian-Pomeranian Voivodeship, in north-central Poland.
