= Trzcionek =

- Village
- Location within Poland
- Coordinates: 53°36′2″N 17°53′50″E
- Country: Poland
- Voivodeship: Kuyavian-Pomeranian
- County: Tuchola
- Gmina: Tuchola
- Population: 29

Trzcionek [ˈtʂt͡ɕɔnɛk] is a village in the administrative district of Gmina Tuchola, within Tuchola County, Kuyavian-Pomeranian Voivodeship, in north-central Poland.
