= Bladowo-Wybudowanie =

- Village
- Location within Poland
- Coordinates: 53°36′5″N 17°50′42″E
- Country: Poland
- Voivodeship: Kuyavian-Pomeranian
- County: Tuchola
- Gmina: Tuchola

Bladowo-Wybudowanie [blaˈdɔvɔ vɨbudɔˈvaɲɛ] is a village in the administrative district of Gmina Tuchola, within Tuchola County, Kuyavian-Pomeranian Voivodeship, in north-central Poland.

Until 2007 it was called Wybudowa Bladowskie.
