= Bielska Struga =

- Village
- Location within Poland
- Coordinates: 53°39′30″N 17°58′40″E
- Country: Poland
- Voivodeship: Kuyavian-Pomeranian
- County: Tuchola
- Gmina: Tuchola
- Population: 40

Bielska Struga ([ˈbjɛlska ˈstruɡa]; German: Hellfließ) is a village in the administrative district of Gmina Tuchola, within Tuchola County, Kuyavian-Pomeranian Voivodeship, in north-central Poland.
