= Tuchola =

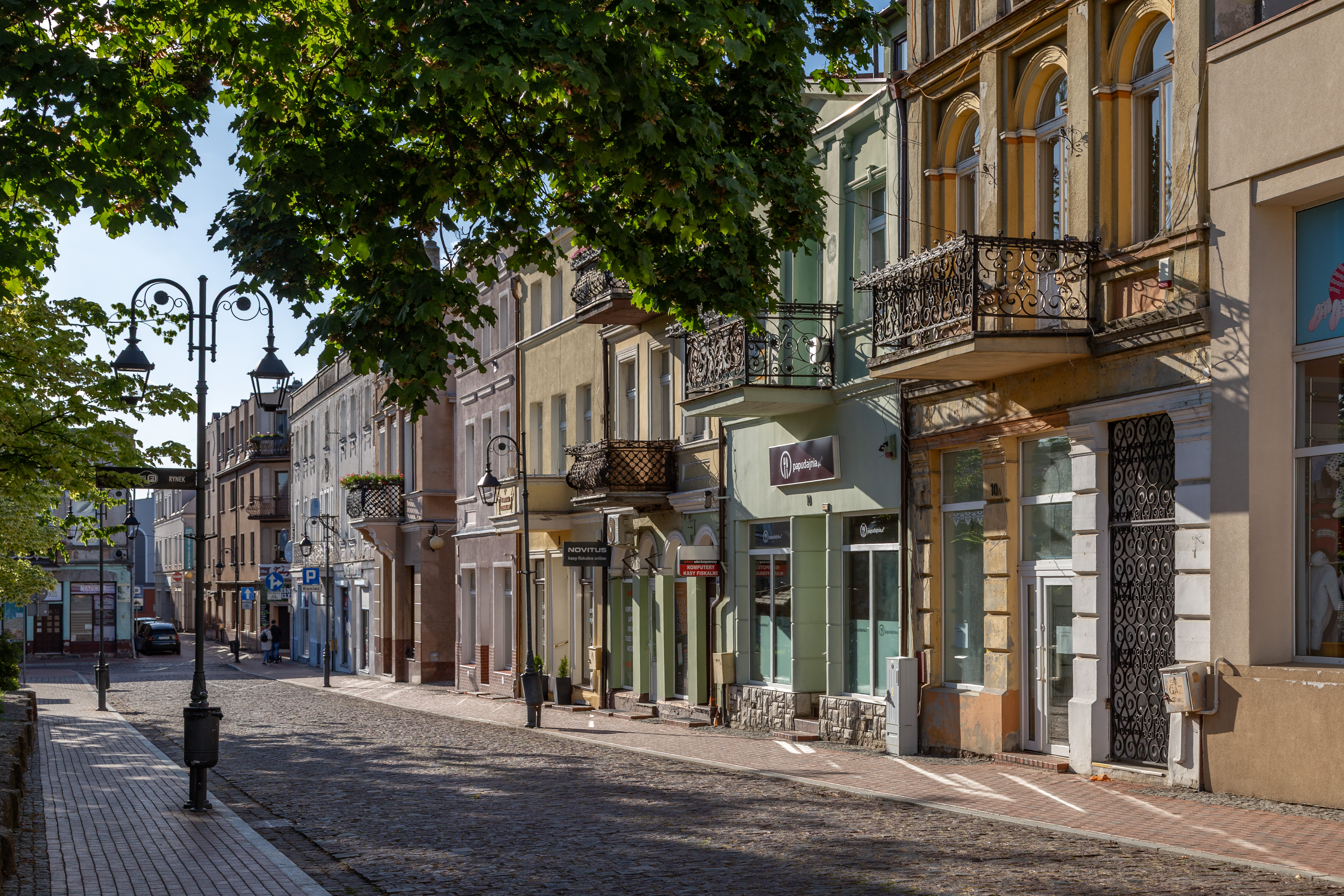
- Old Town (Stare Miasto)

- Flag Coat of arms

- Location within Poland
- Coordinates: 53°36′N 17°51′E
- Country: Poland
- Voivodeship: Kuyavian-Pomeranian
- County: Tuchola
- Gmina: Tuchola
- First mentioned: 1287

Government
  - Mayor: Tadeusz Henryk Kowalski

Area
  - Total: 17.69 km^{2} (6.83 sq mi)

Population (2024)
  - Total: 12,843
  - Density: 726.0/km^{2} (1,880/sq mi)
- Time zone: UTC+1 (CET)
  - Summer (DST): UTC+2 (CEST)
- Postal code: 89-500,89-501
- Car plates: CTU
- Website: http://www.tuchola.pl

Tuchola (Polish pronunciation: [tuˈxɔla]; Kashubian: Tëchòlô; German: Tuchel) is a town in the Kuyavian-Pomeranian Voivodeship in northern Poland. The Pomeranian town, which is the seat of Tuchola County, had a population of 12,843 as of 31 December 2024.

== Geographical location ==
Tuchola lies about 50 kilometres (31 miles) north of Bydgoszcz, close to the Tuchola Forests. Forest areas to the east and north of the town form the protected area of Tuchola Landscape Park.

== History ==
=== Early history ===
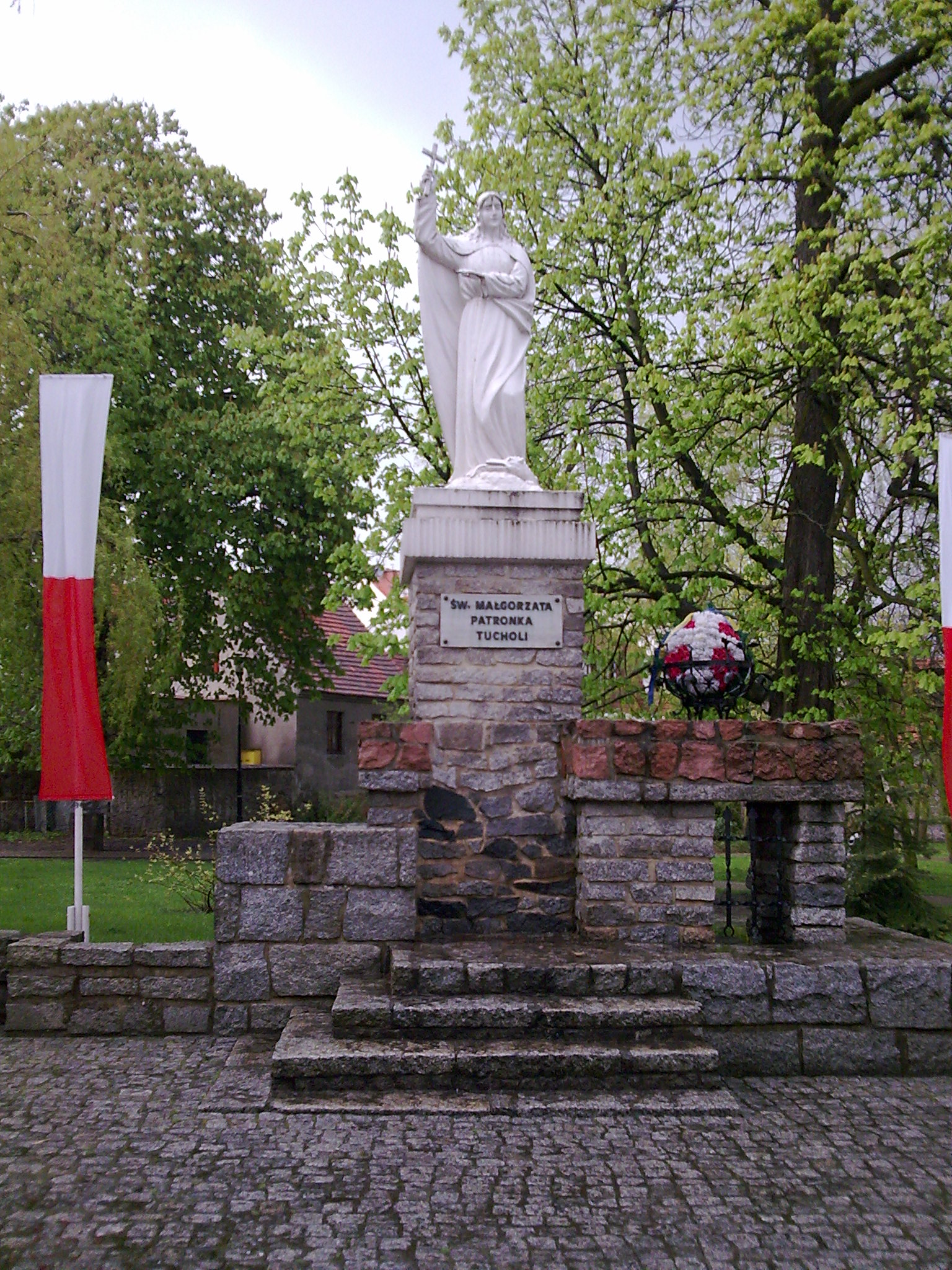
Statue of Saint Margaret, the patron saint of Tuchola

Settlement around Tuchola dates from 980, while the town was first mentioned in 1287, when the local church was consecrated by the archbishop of Gniezno Jakub Świnka. It was part of medieval Poland since the establishment of the state in the 10th century, and during its fragmentation it was ruled by the dukes of Gdańsk Pomerania. The place was one of the strongholds of the count of Nowe Peter Swienca, who owned a fortified domicile in the area. In 1330 Tuchola came into possession of the Teutonic Order. It received Chełmno law in 1346 from Heinrich Dusemer, the Grand Master of the Teutonic Order, although it probably received town rights before, when it was still part of the Kingdom of Poland. At that time, the town already had defensive walls, a castle, a town hall and the Gothic Church of St. Bartholomew.

After the Order's defeat in the Battle of Grunwald on July 14, 1410, a Polish-Lithuanian army recaptured the town on November 5, 1410, but the Order regained the town in the First Peace of Thorn in 1411. In 1440 the town joined the Prussian Confederation, which opposed Teutonic rule, and at the request of which King Casimir IV Jagiellon signed the act of re-incorporation of the town and region to the Kingdom of Poland in 1454. The town became again part of Poland and Poles manned the castle. Tuchola became the seat of the local starosts, the first of which was Mikołaj Szarlejski. During the subsequent Thirteen Years' War, in 1464, a Polish-Teutonic battle was fought there, ending in a Polish victory. The Teutonic Order renounced claims to the town in the Second Peace of Thorn in 1466. Tuchola was a royal town of the Polish Crown, administratively part of the Pomeranian Voivodeship in the province of Royal Prussia in the larger Greater Poland Province. During the Swedish invasion of Poland (1655–1660), the town and the castle were besieged by the Swedes five times, but to no avail.

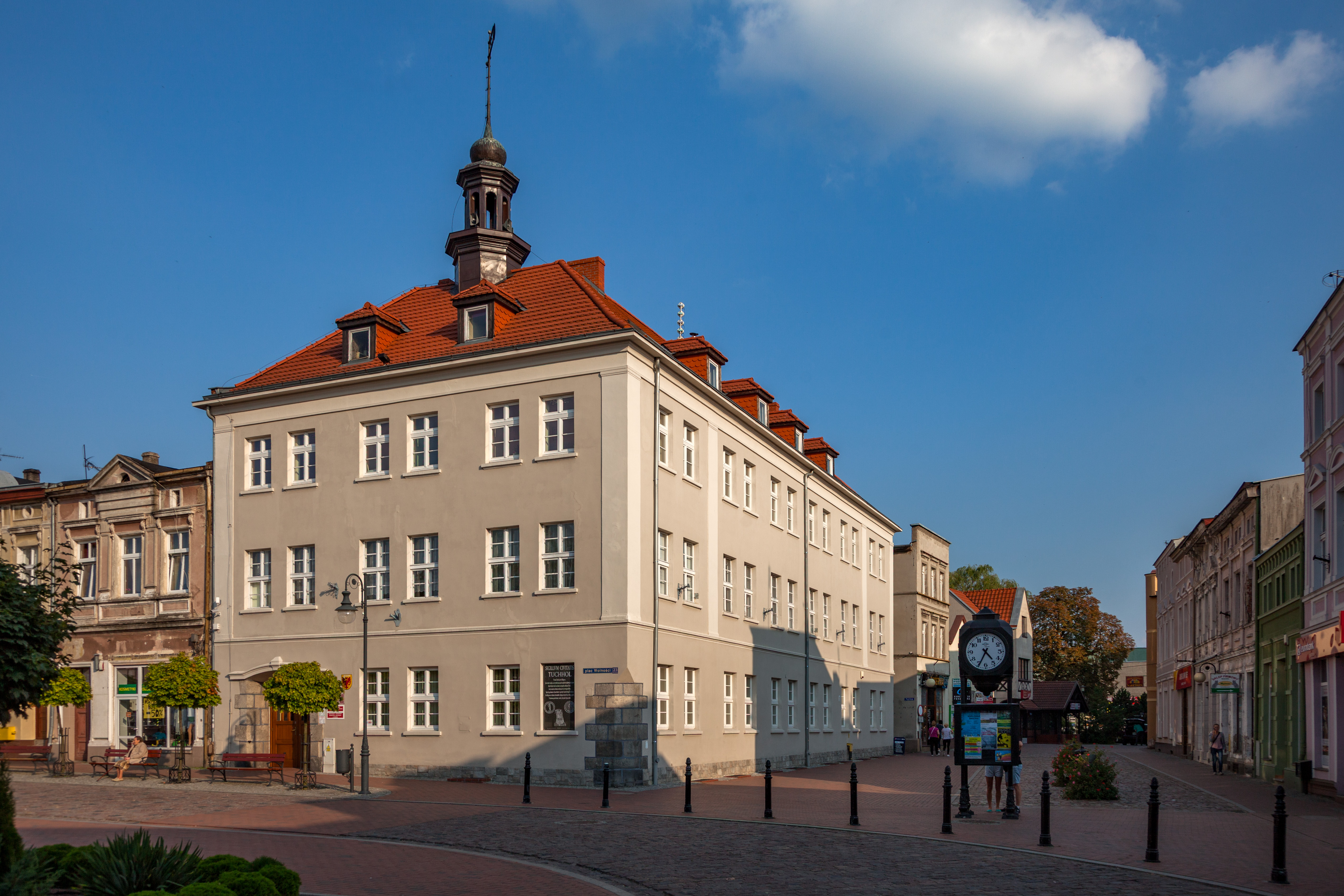
Part of the Old Town

=== Late modern period ===
Under the First Partition of Poland in 1772, Tuchola, renamed Tuchel, was annexed by the Kingdom of Prussia. On May 17, 1781, the Church of St. Bartholomew and vast parts of the town burned down. Around 1785 there existed 148 households inside Tuchel, and the town owned both the village of Kiełpin (then Kelpin) and the small estate Wymysłowo (then named Wymislawe). During the reign of Prussian King Frederick the Great, the town was built up again, and German Protestants obtained a church in the town hall. In the early 19th century, during the Napoleonic Wars and Polish national liberation fights, French, Polish, Prussian and Russian troops were stationed in the town. With the unification of Germany under Prussian hegemony in 1871, it became part of the German Empire. The Polish population was subject to Germanisation policies, which intensified after 1871, however, various Polish organizations were founded in Tuchola in the late 19th and early 20th centuries.

=== Early 20th century ===
During World War I, a prisoner-of-war camp was established near the town, mostly for Romanians and Russians, but also Poles, Italians, French and British.

On November 24, 1918, almost two weeks after Poland's declaration of independence, a Polish rally was held in Tuchola. In December, local German settlers protested against the creation of independent Poland. Another Polish rally was held on January 12, 1919. The next Polish rallies took place in 1919, and after the Poles celebrated the anniversary of the Constitution of 3 May 1791, the Germans introduced martial law in Tuchola, and searches were carried out in many Polish homes. Following the 1919 Treaty of Versailles, the town was finally reintegrated with the Second Polish Republic in January 1920.

The former German POW camp became known as Camp No. 7. Beginning in the autumn of 1920 during Polish-Soviet war, thousands of captured Red Army men were placed in the camp of Tuchola. These prisoners of war (POWs) lived in crude dugouts, and hunger, cold, and infectious diseases killed many. According to historians Zbigniew Karpus and Waldemar Rezmer, up to 2,000 prisoners died in the camp before it was closed in 1923. These events tend to be used by some Russian historians, publicists and politicians, who falsely claim that 22,000 POWs died in the camp, also as a result of alleged executions, as part of Russian negationist Anti-Katyn propaganda.

=== World War II ===
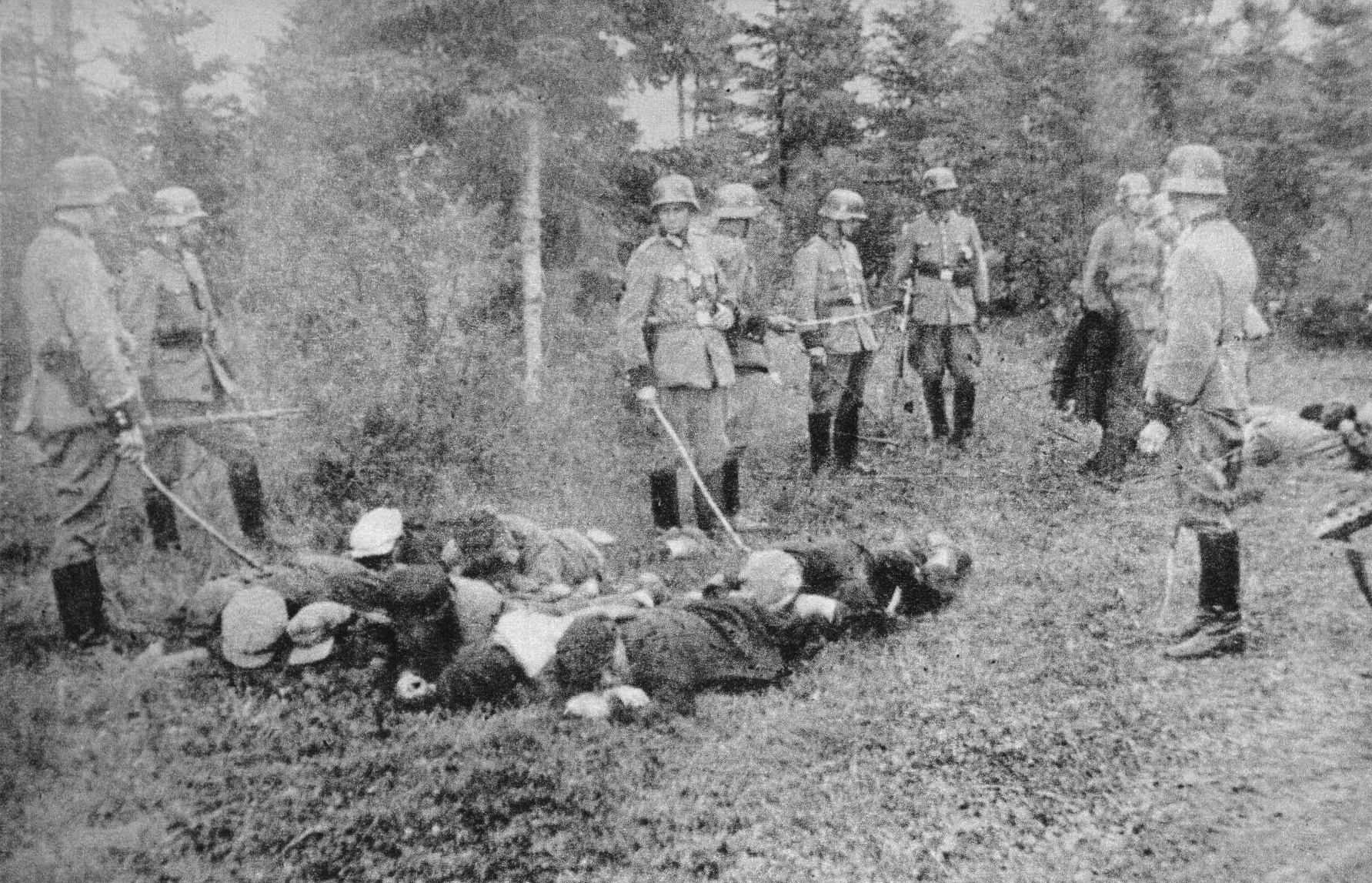
Poles massacred by the Germans in Rudzki Most in 1939

During the invasion of Poland, which marked the beginning of World War II, Tuchola was captured by the Germans on September 2, 1939. Along with the rest of the region, was occupied by Nazi Germany. The Einsatzkommando 16 entered the town to commit various crimes against Poles. From mid-September 1939, Germans carried out mass arrests of Poles from the town and county, who were initially imprisoned in the local courthouse, and after its overcrowding, they were deported to a temporary concentration camp established in the nearby village of Radzim. Some Poles were executed in Radzim, but more were murdered in Rudzki Most (present-day district of Tuchola), where Germans carried out large massacres of Poles in October and November 1939, killing several hundreds people. Among Poles massacred in Rudzki Most were teachers, school principals, merchants, craftsmen and local officials from Tuchola, including mayor Stanisław Saganowski, as well as farmers, priests, foresters, postmen, railwaymen, merchants, craftsmen and policemen from nearby villages.

The Polish resistance was active in the town, including local units of the Union of Armed Struggle-Home Army and Grunwald organizations.

After the German defeat in 1945, the town reverted to Poland.

Architecture of Tuchola

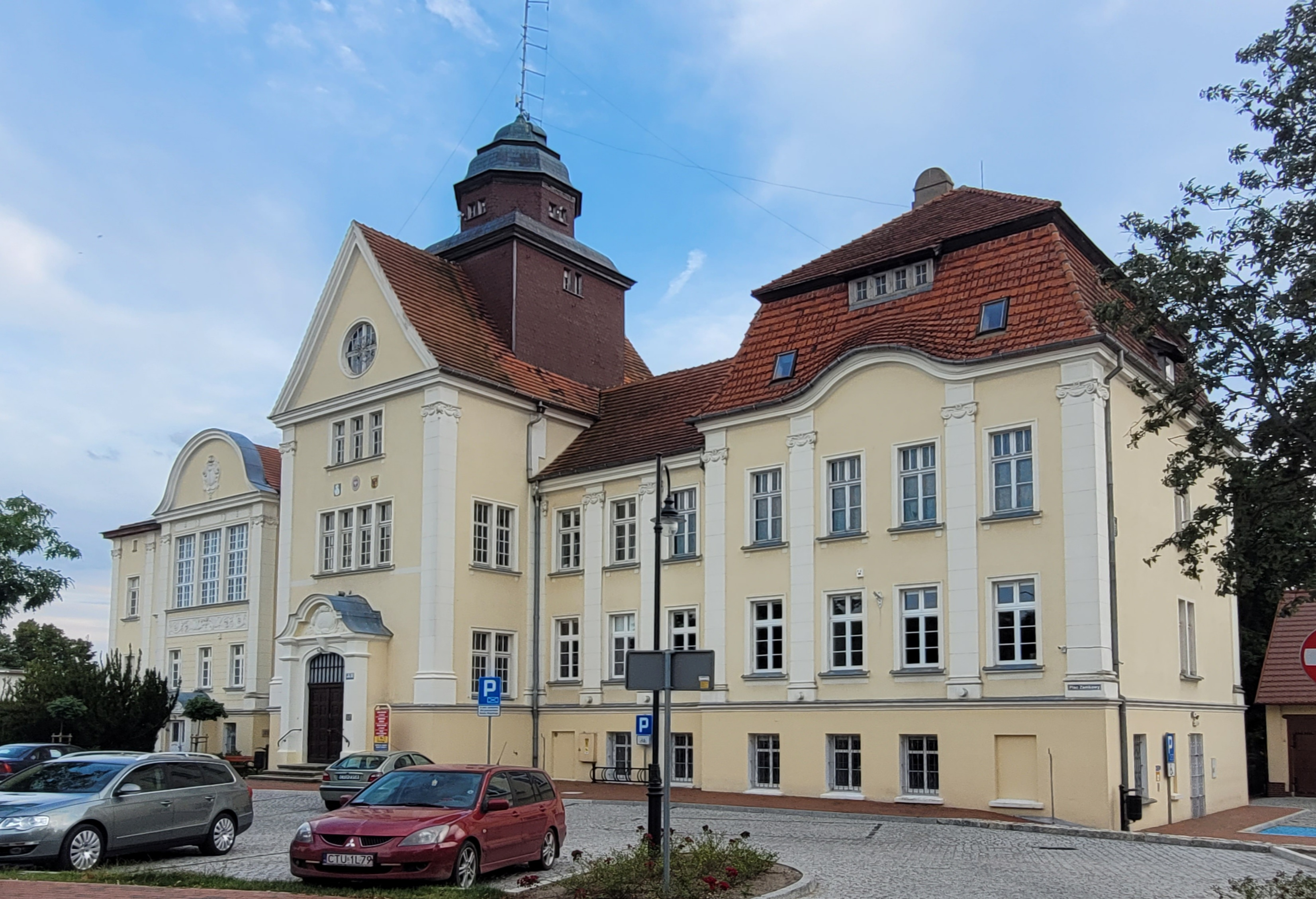
Town Hall

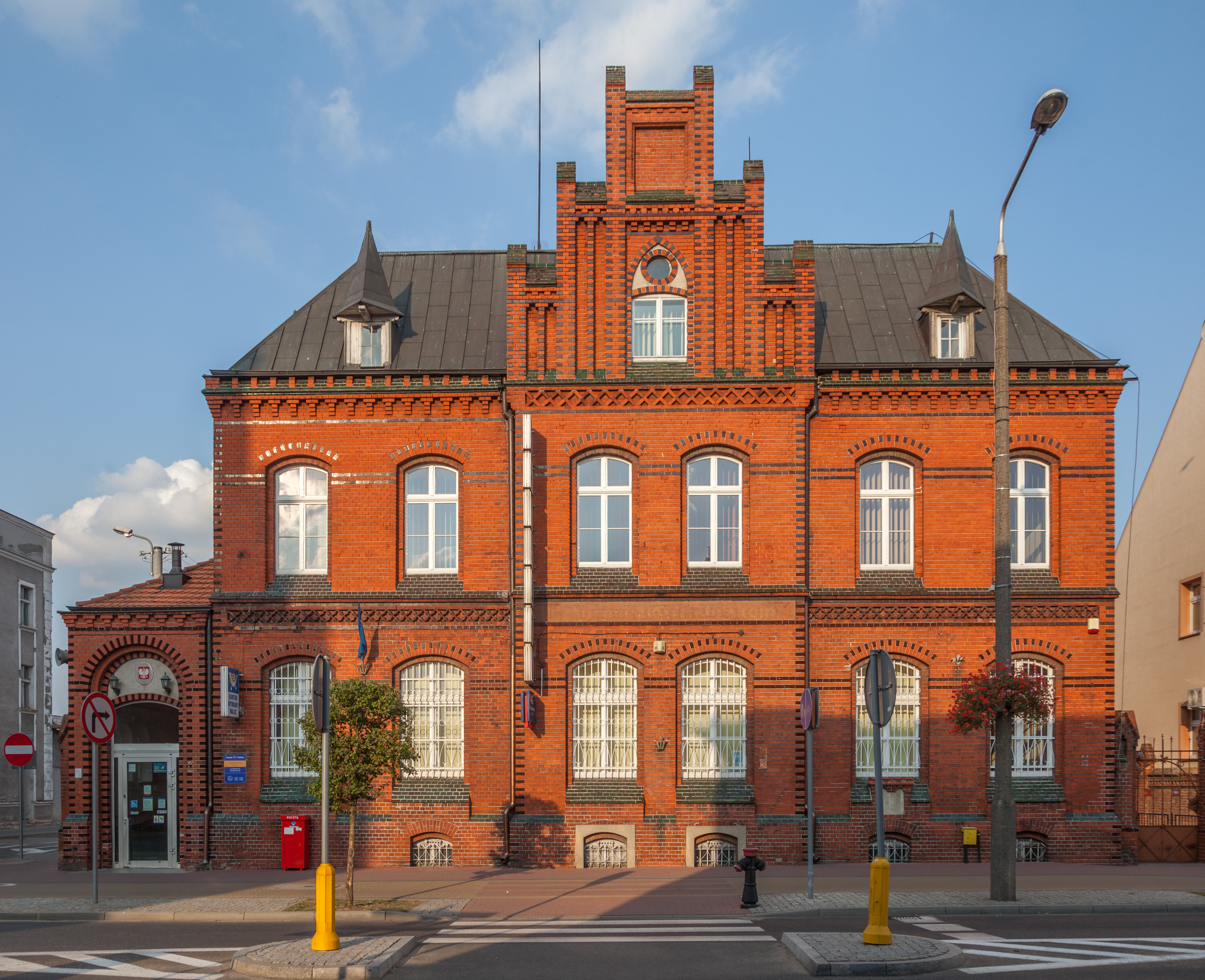
Post office

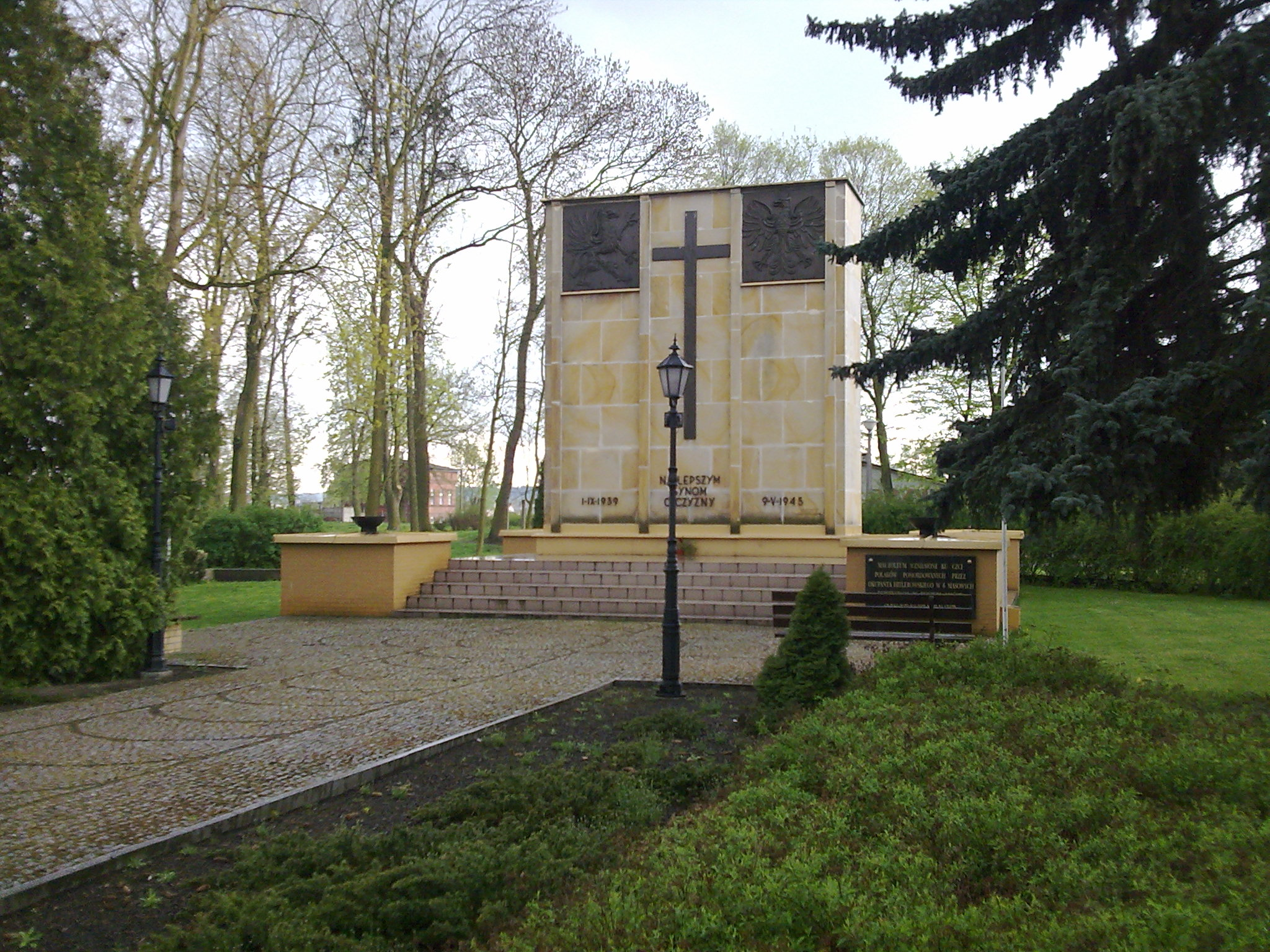
Mausoleum of Poles murdered during the German occupation in Rudzki Most

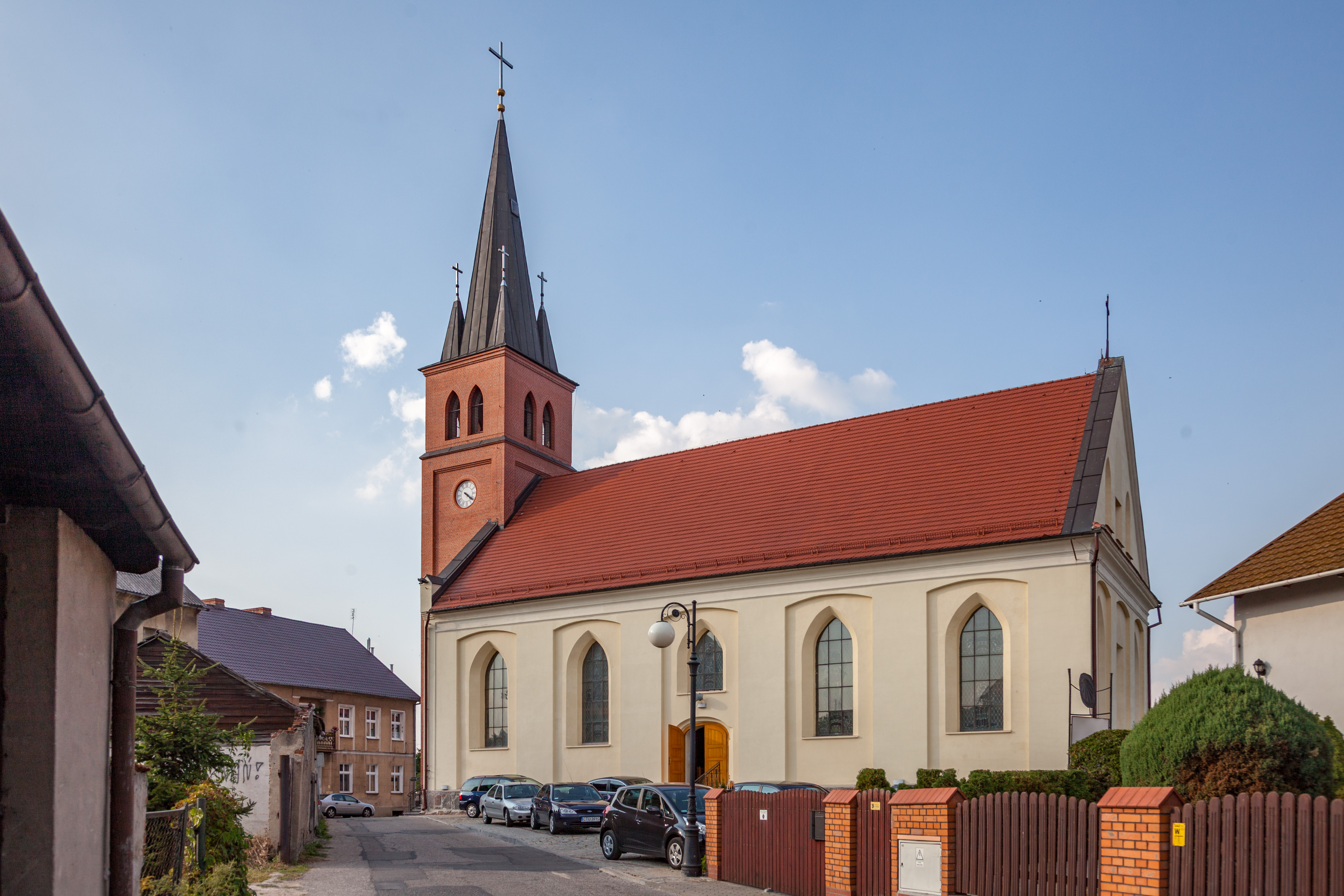
Saint James church

=== Number of inhabitants by year ===
Historical population

Year	Pop.	±%
1772	490	—
1802	1,159	+136.5%
1805	1,251	+7.9%
1831	1,283	+2.6%
1837	1,435	+11.8%
1843	1,801	+25.5%
1865	2,579	+43.2%
1875	2,780	+7.8%
1880	3,066	+10.3%
1890	2,826	−7.8%

Year	Pop.	±%
1905	3,448	+22.0%
1910	4,232	+22.7%
1921	4,412	+4.3%
1931	5,477	+24.1%
1939	6,000	+9.5%
1950	6,095	+1.6%
1960	8,114	+33.1%
2013	13,418	+65.4%
2024	12,843	−4.3%

== Education ==
- Higher School of Environmental Management (Polish: Wyższa Szkoła Zarządzania Środowiskiem)

== Famous residents ==
- Louis Lewin (1850–1929), physician, pharmacologist, toxicologist in Berlin
- Max Liebermann von Sonnenberg (1848–1911), German politician
- Johannes Holzmann (Senna Hoy) (1882–1914), anarchist author
- Wilhelm Ambrosius (1903–1955), Kriegsmarine officer
- Marcin Jędrzejewski - speedway rider and current member of Polish national junior team.
- Tadeusz Zwiefka - popular TV journalist, and a Civic Platform Member of European Parliament.

== See also ==
- Camps for Russian prisoners and internees in Poland (1919–1924)
