= Wiśniówka, Kuyavian-Pomeranian Voivodeship =

Wiśniówka
- Village
- Location within Poland
- Coordinates: 53°37′7″N 17°52′6″E
- Country: Poland
- Voivodeship: Kuyavian-Pomeranian
- County: Tuchola
- Gmina: Tuchola
- Population: 66

Wiśniówka [viɕˈɲufka] is a village in the administrative district of Gmina Tuchola, within Tuchola County, Kuyavian-Pomeranian Voivodeship, in north-central Poland.
