= Thomas E. Klocek =

Thomas E. Klocek is a former part-time instructor at DePaul University. His teaching career at DePaul ended as a result of an altercation with pro-Palestinian students at an exhibit in the cafeteria of DePaul's downtown Chicago campus. His supporters have argued that he is a victim of "political correctness" and that his right to free speech has been violated. The university however, has stated that he was fired due to "belligerent and menacing" conduct towards students, which included shouting and throwing papers. DePaul University offered Klocek, who was not tenured, the continuation of his teaching position if he apologized to the students for his behavior. Klocek rejected this and instead sued the school for defamation and breach of contract. The case was dismissed.

== Klocek's career at DePaul ==
Klocek instructed students as a part-time adjunct professor at the School for New Learning, a school for working adults. There Klocek created and taught a variety of courses ranging from “Languages & Cultures of the World” to “Russian and American Founding Documents”. He taught at DePaul university for 15 years, during which time he received consistently positive student reviews. Klocek's area of expertise were Slavic languages and Russian and Old Slavic literature. Klocek, who did not have a PhD, noted that initially he took the part-time position because he was working on a doctoral thesis, but that got caught up in his teaching and never finished his dissertation.

== The Incident ==
During the yearly Loop Student Fair campus event where student groups setup exhibits in the school's cafeteria, Klocek approached the exhibit maintained by Students for Justice in Palestine. There an altercation ensued between four students and Klocek. Another four students from a group called "United Muslims Moving Ahead" from a neighboring exhibit became involved in the altercation. After approximately 30 minutes, other student groups called the faculty to intervene. Klocek was escorted out of the cafeteria by campus security, but returned and made a gesture towards the students, before leaving again. The students complained to the University about the altercation, describing it as a "racist encounter".

=== The Students' version of the Events ===
The students noted that they first noticed Klocek pacing back and forth near their exhibit. They then claim that he approached their exhibit and began asking questions. They claim that as they responded, he would quickly change the subject erratically from one subject to another. They claim that he eventually stated that there was no such thing as a Palestinian people. When one student interjected that she was Palestinian, the students claim that Klocek began to shout and throw the material on their stall at them, at which point students from a neighboring exhibit, the United Muslims Moving Ahead got involved. They claim that Klocek began shouting profanities at them and told them that their religion was based on terror. The students claim that after campus security removed Klocek from the event, he returned, "made an obscene hand gesture (he flipped us off)" and left.

=== Klocek's version of the Events ===
Klocek claims that he approached the group because he disagreed with the content of the groups' leaflets. He stated that one leaflet described the death of American activist Rachel Corrie in Israel as "murder"; a charge which he considered to be offensive. As the debate became more heated, Klocek claims that the students compared Israel to Nazi Germany at which point a shouting match ensued. Klocek acknowledges that he told the United Muslims Moving Ahead student group that all terrorist attacks were committed by Muslims, but he claims that he was quoting Chicago Sun-Times columnist Neil Steinberg. Klocek also acknowledged that he raised his voice, but he denied using profanity. Klocek denies throwing the exhibit material at the students and claims that he put that back in a stack. Klocek also acknowledged that he returned and confronted the students again after being escorted away by campus security, but he claims that the gesture he made with his hand, involved flicking his thumb at his chin, which he argued is an Italian New Jersey expression meaning, "I'm finished" or "I'm out of here".

== Aftermath ==
The students began circulating an email with their version of the events to the local student body. The student newspaper, the DePaulia, later published a story about the students' version of the event. Klocek wrote a response to the story, which was also printed in the paper. Both the Students for Justice in Palestine and United Muslims Moving Ahead wrote complaint letters to the university administration. The university suspended Klocek with pay. Following negotiations, the university offered Klocek the return of his teaching position, if he apologized to the students and agreed to observers intermittently sitting in his classes. Klocek declined the offer and hired an attorney, suing the university for defamation of character and breach of contract.

Klocek, along with a number of conservative bloggers, claimed that at heart the issue was one of freedom of speech and academic freedom. They claim that DePaul has ended Klocek's career as a result of his pro-Israeli views. DePaul officials deny that description, arguing that it was Klocek's "belligerent and menacing" behavior towards the students which led to his suspension. University officials were quoted as saying "we emphatically reject that this is at all a matter of academic freedom. For DePaul it was about his conduct not his content".

Klocek's claims for breach of contract against DePaul were dismissed with prejudice on January 30, 2006. His claims for defamation of character were dismissed in another hearing later in 2006 by the First District Court of Illinois. In 2010, the Illinois Supreme Court refused Klocek's request for an appeal, ending the lawsuit.

== See also ==
- Norman Finkelstein's Tenure Controversy at DePaul
