= Jesionowo, Kuyavian-Pomeranian Voivodeship =

Jesionowo
- Village
- Location within Poland
- Coordinates: 53°36′49″N 17°50′49″E
- Country: Poland
- Voivodeship: Kuyavian-Pomeranian
- County: Tuchola
- Gmina: Tuchola

Jesionowo [jɛɕɔˈnɔvɔ] is a village in the administrative district of Gmina Tuchola, within Tuchola County, Kuyavian-Pomeranian Voivodeship, in north-central Poland.
