= Mały Mędromierz =

- Village
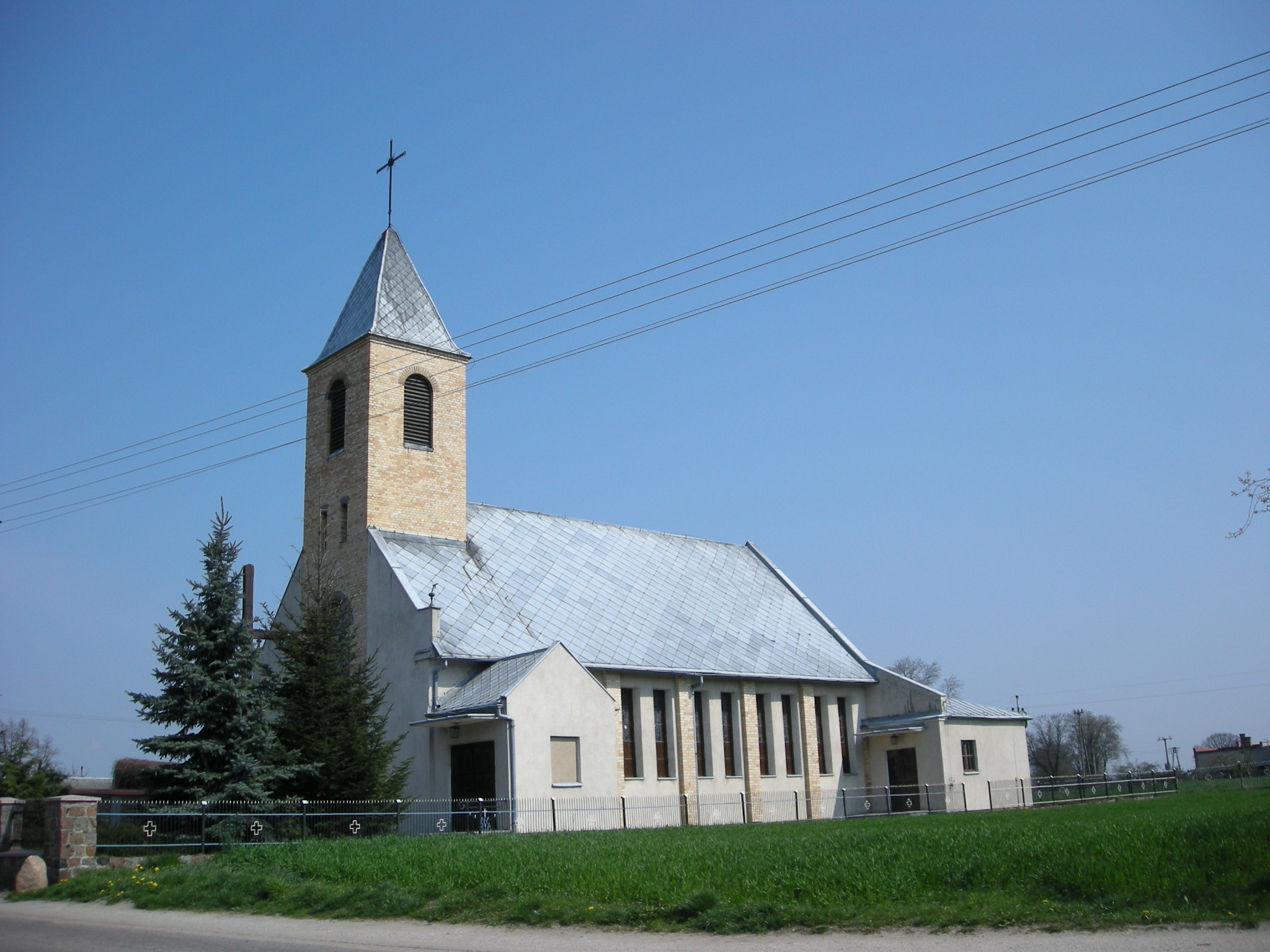
- Church in the village

- Location within Poland
- Coordinates: 53°33′56″N 17°48′48″E
- Country: Poland
- Voivodeship: Kuyavian-Pomeranian
- County: Tuchola
- Gmina: Tuchola
- Population: 480
- Time zone: UTC+1 (CET)
  - Summer (DST): UTC+2 (CEST)
- Vehicle registration: CTU

Mały Mędromierz ([ˈmawɨ mɛnˈdrɔmjɛʂ]; German: Klein Mangelmühle, 1942-45 Mangelmühlchen) is a village in the administrative district of Gmina Tuchola, within Tuchola County, Kuyavian-Pomeranian Voivodeship, in north-central Poland. It is located within the historic region of Pomerania.

== History ==
Mały Mędromierz was a royal village of the Polish Crown, administratively located in the Tuchola County in the Pomeranian Voivodeship.

During the German occupation of Poland (World War II), in 1940 and 1944, the Germans carried out expulsions of Poles, whose houses were then handed over to Germans as part of the Lebensraum policy. Among the expelled were the families of Poles murdered in November 1940 in nearby Bralewnica, and Poles expelled in 1944 were held in the Potulice concentration camp, and then enslaved as forced labour of new German colonists.
