= Kloek =

Kloek is a surname. Notable people with the surname include:

- Els Kloek (born 1952), Dutch historian
- Joost Kloek (born 1943), Dutch historian
- Tania Kloek (born 1973), Belgian actress
- Teunis Kloek (born 1936), Dutch economist

== See also ==
- Johan Kloeck, Belgian athlete
