= Kiełpin, Kuyavian-Pomeranian Voivodeship =

Kiełpin
- Village
- Location within Poland
- Coordinates: 53°37′27″N 17°52′57″E
- Country: Poland
- Voivodeship: Kuyavian-Pomeranian
- County: Tuchola
- Gmina: Tuchola
- Population: 820

Kiełpin ([ˈkʲɛu̯pin]; German: Kelpin, 1942-45 Kelpen) is a village in the administrative district of Gmina Tuchola, within Tuchola County, Kuyavian-Pomeranian Voivodeship, in north-central Poland.
