= Klocek, Poland =

Klocek
- Village
- Location within Poland
- Coordinates: 53°41′30″N 17°56′24″E
- Country: Poland
- Voivodeship: Kuyavian-Pomeranian
- County: Tuchola
- Gmina: Tuchola
- Population: 50

Klocek ([ˈklɔt͡sɛk]; German: Klotzek, 1943-45 Klotzeck) is a village in the administrative district of Gmina Tuchola, within Tuchola County, Kuyavian-Pomeranian Voivodeship, in north-central Poland.
