= Strumiany =

Strumiany may refer to the following places:

- Strumiany, Lesser Poland Voivodeship (south Poland)
- Strumiany, Łódź Voivodeship (central Poland)
- Strumiany, Masovian Voivodeship (east-central Poland)
- Strumiany, Gostyń County in Greater Poland Voivodeship (west-central Poland)
- Strumiany, Poznań County in Greater Poland Voivodeship (west-central Poland)
- Strumiany, Lubusz Voivodeship (west Poland)
- Strumiany, West Pomeranian Voivodeship (north-west Poland)
