= Świerki =

Świerki may refer to the following places in Poland:

- Świerki, Lower Silesian Voivodeship (south-west Poland)
- Świerki, Łódź Voivodeship (central Poland)
- Świerki, Pomeranian Voivodeship (north Poland)
