= Selma Steinmetz =

Austrian educator and author

Selma Steinmetz (1 September 1907 – 16 June 1979) was an Austrian educator and author who emigrated to France after the cancellation of democracy in Austria. In France she became a resistance activist following the German invasion in 1940. At the end of 1945 she was able to return to Vienna (where she had spent her student years) and was one of the first researchers to study the histories of victims of National Socialism. After 1963 she was an important contributor to the work of the Austrian Resistance Archive ("Dokumentationsarchiv des österreichischen Widerstandes").

== Biography ==
Selma Steinmetz was born in Vienna, the eldest of her parents' three recorded daughters. Heinrich Chaim Steinmetz (1882-1941/42), her father, worked as a retailer. He had come to the city originally from a village called Tyczyn near Łódź in what was known before 1915 as "Congress (Russian) Poland". Her mother, born Helene "Leni" Landesman Blass (1879-1933), was a product of Vienna's Jewish community. Both Steinsmetz's parents were active in the Social Democratic Party which during the early 1930s was increasingly constrained and then, in 1934, banned by the government. She grew up in the family home at Gaußplatz 3 in north-central Vienna ("20. Stadtbezirk").

She studied History, Germanistics and Education at the University of Vienna and qualified to work as teacher. As part of her university-level education she produced a 246-page dissertation in 1931 on the nineteenth century writer-polymath Bettina von Arnim. While a student she also joined the Social Democratic Labour Party and was, in her own words, "at times active and at times inactive" within it. Her cousin, speaking in 2002, recalled that she "became very revolutionary", though the observation may refer more to the second half of the 1930s than the first. Helene Steinmetz, her mother, died of Pneumonia in August 1933, aged just 53. The short-lived February uprising in 1934 failed in its immediate objective of restoring democratic government and it seems to have coincided with an intensification of the antisemitism that had been bubbling away on the streets of Vienna for several decades. The entire family was now unemployed: Steinmetz later recalled a "total collapse in our family circle after February 1934". It was at this point that Selma Steinmetz had her first contacts with Austrian and foreign communists. On account both of her Jewish ethnicity and her left-wing politics, she was unable to find teaching work in Chancellor Schuschnigg's Austria, and in 1937 she emigrated to Paris. Her intention was to continue on to Spain in order to take part in the Spanish Civil War against Franco, but that part of the plan never came to fruition. Instead she stayed in France where, at the recommendation of an Austrian exile called Paul Kessler, she joined the Communist Party and worked for the party's "literature distribution" department. It was also in Paris that she met and soon afterwards teamed up with Oskar Grossmann. They remained together till 1944, though they never formally married.

Back home Austria had been integrated into a newly enlarged Germany following the annexation of March 1938. Selma's younger sisters had both left Vienna by this time, but her father was still living with his new wife at the apartment in Gaußplatz where the family had grown up. (Chaim Steinmetz had married Eugenie Piskaty in 1936.) During 1939 they were thrown out of their apartment and moved to multi-occupancy accommodation at Ferdinandstraße 19 in Vienna-Leopoldstadt ("2. Stadtbezirk"). On 23 or 31 October 1941 they were deported to the Łódź Ghetto and murdered.

In September 1939 the French government reacted to the German invasion of Poland by declaring war on Germany. Two weeks later Soviet forces invaded Poland from the other side. While everyone waited nervously to see what governments would do next, physical conditions for Paris residents did not immediately change very much. In May 1940, however, the German army invaded France. The armistice concluded on 22 June 1940 imposed military occupation on the northern half and a western coastal strip of the country, while creating in the southern half of France a so-called "free zone", administered from Vichy by a puppet government under a widely respected octogenarian French war hero. Selma Steinmetz and Oskar Grossmann were among the hundreds of political refugees who joined hundreds of thousands of Parisians spontaneously fleeing towards the south as the German army approached the French capital from the north. They ended up in the Toulouse area. Selma Steinmetz joined the French resistance.

Many of the other political exiles in the Toulouse area were also Austrian communists who had been living in Paris till 1940. These included Alfred Klahr, Heinrich Fritz, Othmar Strobl and her own partner, Oskar Grossmann. It all made for what Steinmetz would later describe as "a very lively classroom" ("... eine sehr rege Schulungstätigkeit"). During 1940 Steinmetz was accepted as a candidate for party membership. At the same time she was working in the Quaker secretariat in Toulouse. This made it possible for her to help numerous Austrian and German comrades being held in the concentration camps in the Toulouse/Montauban area. In material terms the conditions under which the emigrants existed were bad, especially through the winter of 1941/42 which was a harsh one. Money and food were in short supply. They lived in unheated rooms and were subject to frequent harassment from the authorities. Since they were living as unregistered foreigners, their presence was technically illegal which meant a constant risk of arrest by the "Pétain police" and possible detention in the camps, although before 1942 there was no significant risk of deportation. In order to supplement her income Selma Steinmetz took to working "at home", making leather purses.

During 1942 the German government's strategic and military reasons for sustaining a semi-independent puppet state administered from Vichy became ever less persuasive, and in November 1942 a military occupation by Germany and Italy was imposed by the Germans (or, across to the east beyond Marseilles, the Italians). In towns and cities Gestapo uniforms were increasingly to be seen on the streets. For German-speaking political exiles there were new dangers but also new opportunities. Selma Steinmetz and the others were about to become far more active in terms of resistance activism, using false names and "disappearing underground". Meanwhile, both in the camps and in "private accommodation", there was now an ever present of being picked out as a "German" and arrested by the Gestapo or, indeed, by members of the regular German military. Steinmetz herself avoided arrest at this stage only because she was tipped off by the Quakers who somehow had advance knowledge that she was about to be among those "rounded up". She was helped by the remarkable Archbishop of Toulouse to disappear into a convent operated by the Sisters of Maria Reparatricis, a religious order which in more normal times concentrated on organising missionary work in Africa and further afield. She was one of a large number of Jewish emigrants from Nazi Germany whom Archbishop Saliège "took under his protection". Steinmetz later recalled the convent: "No one was allowed out: no one was allowed in so easily". She remained hidden in the convent till she was able to obtain false identity documents through the party, after which, like many other of the comrades in Toulouse, she made her way to Lyon where she was subsequently joined by Oskar Grossmann.

Activities in which she now became involved included the production of (highly illegal) newspapers and leaflets for distribution to German soldiers in occupied France (which after 1942, increasingly included the "free zone" along with the more formally occupied northern half of the country). She was working under the auspices of "Travail Anti-Allemand" ("Anti-German work") which was a sub-division of the French resistance. Production of a newspaper entitled "Soldat am Mittelmeer" ("Soldier on the Mediterranean") was a core activity on which Steinmetz and Grossmann worked together. The newspaper and the various leaflets reported on the inhumanity and cruelty of the National Socialist regime. They urged desertion and an end to the "criminal war". There were also other "education" projects directed at individual German and Austrian soldiers and a large number of individual support and assistance tasks on behalf of comrades and emigrants in need.

Selma Steinmetz was arrested in May 1944 and then released. A few weeks later, in June 1944, she and other members of the Austrian left-wing resistance group were again arrested by the Gestapo and taken in for interrogation, which involved a five day intensive torture session.

The arrest and subsequent torture sessions in Lyon were for the most part undertaken by a Gestapo officer originally from Vienna called Eduard Tucek and an unnamed Gestapo colleague. Tucek was determined to extract from her names and addresses of her contacts who were active in the Resistance. Because they were living illegally in France the activists were obliged to adhere rigidly to a cellular organisation structure, as a result of which Steinmetz would have been unable to provide Tucek with the real names and addresses of her resistance comrades even if she had wished to, however.

Tucek then chained her up and hit her with his clenched fist. After that he took an ox-whip and used it over her body so that her body was covered with streams of blood and loose strips of her own skin. The next day he introduced her to his bath tactics. She was made to undress down to her underclothes and bound at the hands and feet. She was then placed in a bath which was filled with cold water, and her face was repeatedly pushed underwater. Each time she was able to surface the shower was directed on her face so that she found it very hard to breathe and was frequently on the verge of suffocating. Then Tucek pulled her feet so that her head was again dragged below the surface. The torture session took place in the presence of several of Tucek's "Gestapo torture students" to whom he explained, as he "worked", how to conduct these sessions in order to get prisoners to talk.

Oskar Grossmann had been badly injured and blinded by a bomb blast on 27 May 1944. (He was passing by a group of German soldiers at the time, and was probably a "collateral victim" of an explosion intended for the soldiers.) Arrested in June 1944 at the same time as Steinmetz, he was presumably also subjected to interrogation and torture. He did not survive.

Steinmetz was taken by train to Fresnes Prison, a short distance to the south of Paris. Fresnes was during this period a vast Gestapo facility, and Tucek also made the move. At Fresnes she faced further interrogation by Tucek who now threatened to shoot her. From Fresnes she was moved, on 7 August 1944, to the nearby Drancy internment camp which was a collection point for the Auschwitz deportations. Steinmetz was one of those liberated on 17 August 1944, however. The next week Paris itself was liberated. Selma Steinmetz remained in Paris till 1945: much of her time was dedicated to caring for concentration camp survivors.

She returned home to Vienna at the end of that year. The city had been liberated by the Soviets in April 1945, but in September 1945 implementation of the Potsdam Agreement saw the Austrian capital divided into a patchwork of military occupation zones, allocated between the Soviets, the Americans, the British and the French. The arrangement lasted till 1955. In January 1946 Steinmetz took a librarianship with the city's libraries service and in 1947 she took charge of the Brigittenau ("20. Stadtbezirk") library branch in the Leystraße, which was in Vienna's Soviet occupation zone. In 1950 a one day absence from work was interpreted as participation in the October strike which had been organised by the Communist Party and enjoyed at least half-hearted support from the Soviet military occupation authorities. Tensions were at a high level. In the wake of the Berlin Blockade the previous year, there were many who thought the Soviets were paving the way for a Communist take-over. This was the political context when Selma Steinmetz was dismissed by the Vienna libraries service with effect from 1 January 1951. Over the next twelve years she supported herself with a succession of jobs in journalism.

In February 1963 the Austrian Resistance Archive ("Dokumentationsarchiv des österreichischen Widerstandes") was founded. Steinmetz, now aged almost 56, took a leading role in the project from the start. Of particular note was her widely respected monograph on Austria's Roma under National Socialism ("Österreichs Zigeuner im NS-Staat"), a pioneering piece of work on a topic previously overlooked by scholars and commentators. Other topics on which she published research included the continuing difficulties and discrimination encountered by women at Austrian universities, Marie von Ebner-Eschenbach and the Slavic peoples, and about Jura Soyfer. She wrote about the persecution of Jews and about the revolutionary socialist Franz Sachs and various other allied topics.

In 1968 Selma Steinmetz resigned her Communist Party membership as a protest over the Warsaw Pact invasion of Czechoslovakia which was the Kremlin's response to cautious political liberalisation under First Party Secretary Alexander Dubček. She was also unhappy with what many saw as the Austrian Party's excessively cautious response to those events. Instead she joined the Austrian League for Human Rights and found in it a new ideological home. Subsequently she also worked with Amnesty International. She remained a lifelong antifascist, setting herself against racism and antisemitism.

Selma Steinmetz died unexpectedly in June 1979 as the result of what had been described as a low-risk minor operation ("... an den Folgen einer harmlosen Operation").

== Celebration ==
Selma Steinmetz was a recipient of the Decoration for Services to the Liberation of Austria ("Ehrenzeichen für Verdienste um die Befreiung Österreichs"). She was also awarded the Austrian decoration of Honour in silver ("...Silbernes Ehrenzeichen").

On 20 April 2007 a group made up of artists and local residents organised a street festival in the Stuwer Quarter ("Stuwerviertel") which is the part of Vienna-Leopoldstadt in which Steinmetz lived for much of her life. The revellers' more serious purpose was to honour Selma Steinmetz and to call for the name of the "Arnetzhoferstraße" (... street) to be changed to "Selma Steinmetzstraße". The proposed change was particularly appropriate because, according to some of those advocating it, Johann Ignaz Arnezhofer (1640-1679) was an antisemitic hate-preacher whom many people felt shared in the responsibility for the expulsion of Jews from Leopoldstadt in the seventeenth century. The demand for the name change was repeated through further street festivals in 2008 and 2009. The street was named after Arnezhofer more than a century earlier, under Mayor Karl Lueger (1844-1910), a high-profile mayor of Vienna and a man whose antisemitic views were more mainstream in the city during the final decades of the nineteenth century than they would have been after the Holocaust. Despite promises by the protestors that they would stick labels with the "new" street name over the official street name signs, the matter remains unresolved at the official level.
