= Battle of Złoczew =

- Part of the January Uprising
Date	22 August 1863
Location	near Złoczew 51°24′53″N 18°36′26″E
Result	Russian victory

Belligerents
(Poland) Polish insurgents	Russian Empire

Commanders and leaders
Edmund Taczanowski	

Casualties and losses
5 dead	
- Location within Poland

The Battle of Złoczew, one of many clashes of the January Uprising, took place on 22 August 1863 near the town of Złoczew, which at that time belonged to Russian-controlled Congress Poland. A Polish insurgent unit under Edmund Taczanowski clashed with a detachment of the Imperial Russian Army and the battle resulted in Russian victory. The insurgents lost 5 men, and after the battle, Taczanowski ordered his party to withdraw towards Niechmirów.

== Sources ==
- Stefan Kieniewicz: Powstanie styczniowe. Warszawa: Państwowe Wydawnictwo Naukowe, 1983. ISBN 83-01-03652-4.
