= Prażmów =

Prażmów may refer to the following places:

- Prażmów, Łódź Voivodeship (central Poland)
- Prażmów, Lublin Voivodeship (east Poland)
- Prażmów, Masovian Voivodeship (east-central Poland)

== See also ==
- Prażmowo, a village in Giżycko County, Warmian-Masurian Voivodeship, in northern Poland
