= Złoczew =

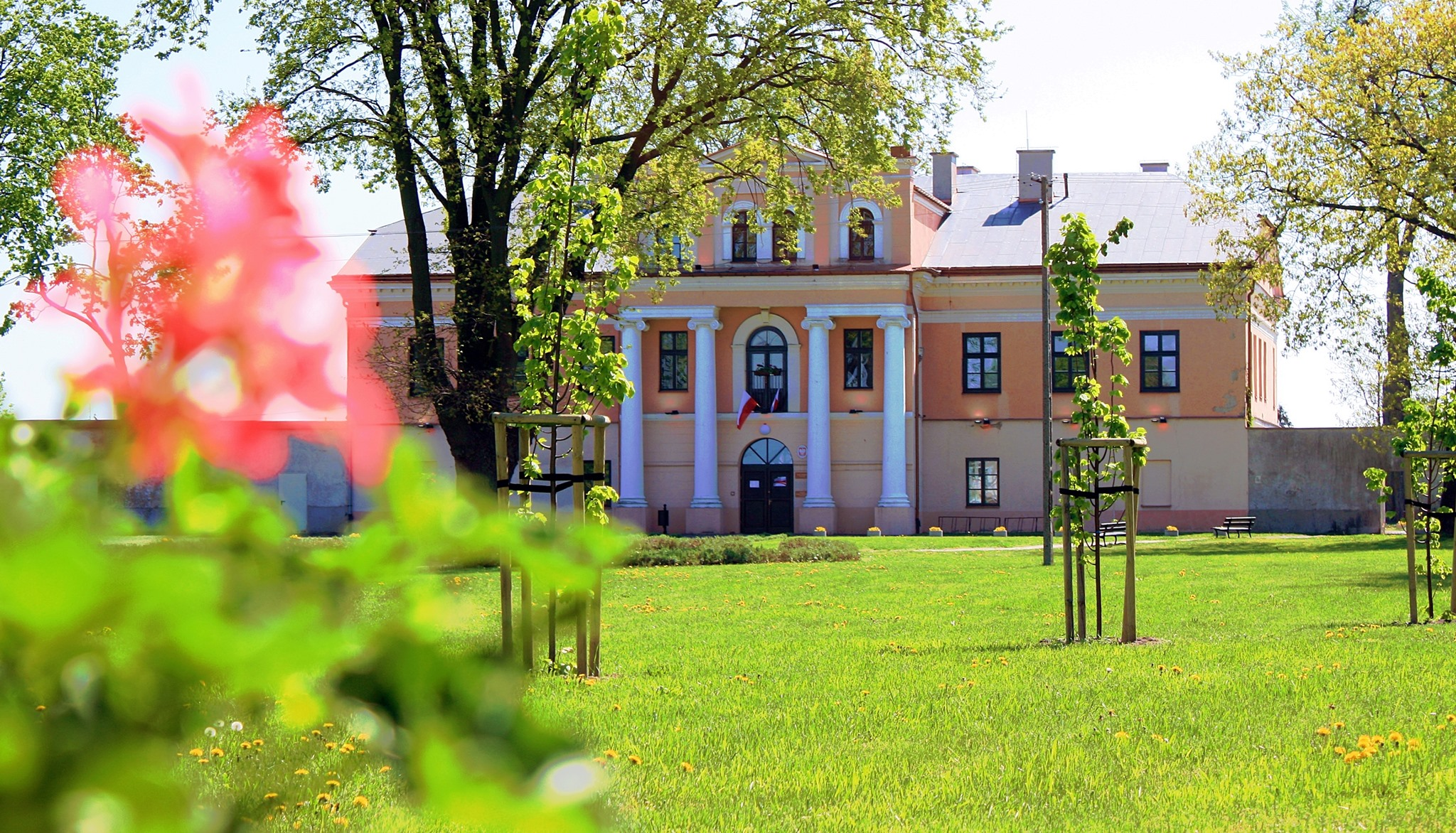
- Ruszkowski Palace in Złoczew

- Coat of arms

- Location within Poland
- Coordinates: 51°24′53″N 18°36′26″E
- Country: Poland
- Voivodeship: Łódź
- County: Sieradz
- Gmina: Złoczew
- First mentioned: 1496
- Town rights: 1605

Government
  - Mayor: Dominik Drzazga

Area
  - Total: 13.8 km^{2} (5.3 sq mi)

Population (31 December 2020)
  - Total: 3,340 ▼
  - Density: 242/km^{2} (627/sq mi)
- Time zone: UTC+1 (CET)
  - Summer (DST): UTC+2 (CEST)
- Postal code: 98-270
- Car plates: ESI
- Website: http://www.zloczew.bazagmin.pl

Złoczew is a town in Sieradz County, Łódź Voivodeship, in central Poland, with 3,340 inhabitants (2020). It is located in the historic Sieradz Land, 23 kilometres (14 miles) south of Sieradz and 23 kilometres (14 miles) north of Wieluń.

Złoczew is a relatively young town in the region, dating back to the Late Middle Ages, with a preserved palace and park ensemble and Renaissance churches. It is located close to the Route of the Heroes of the Battle of Warsaw 1920, the main highway connecting Wrocław with Łódź, Warsaw and Białystok.

== History ==
=== 16th to 18th centuries ===
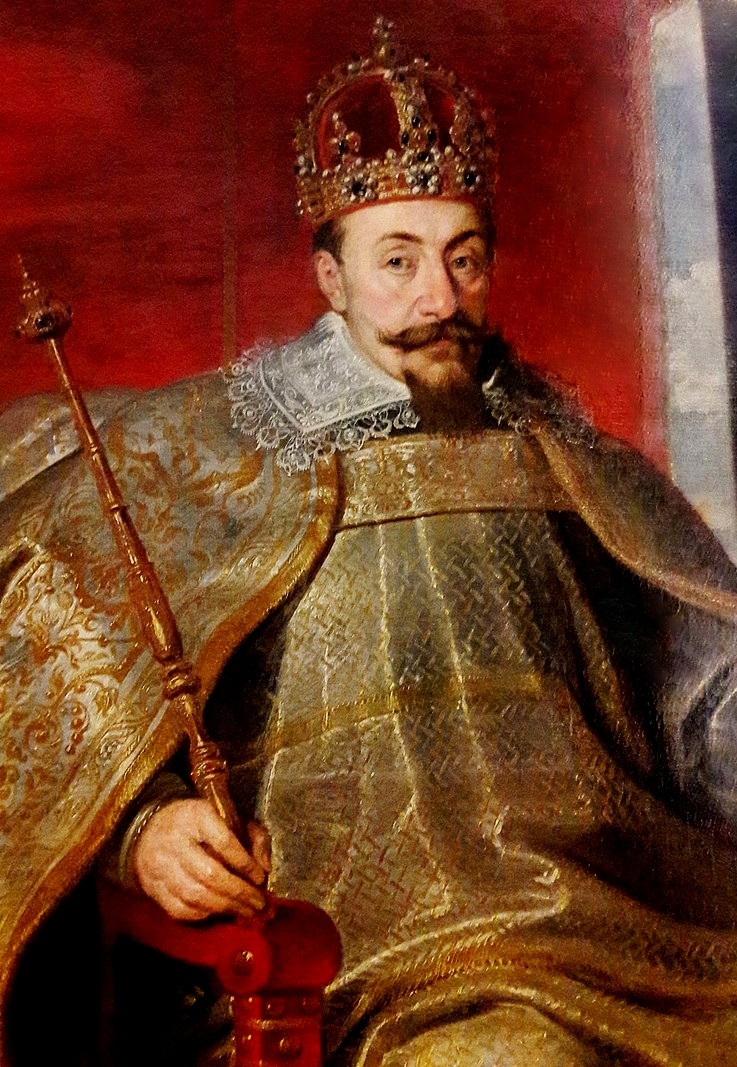
Polish King Sigismund III Vasa vested Złoczew with town rights in 1605

In the mid-16th century, the feudal lord of the area was Stanisław Ruszkowski (1529–1597) whose son, Andrzej Ruszkowski (1563–1619) brought the Order of Cistercians to Złoczew in 1600, building their church and monastery, and in 1601, funded the construction of the parish church for Złoczew. On 14 December 1605, King Sigismund III Vasa issued the charter for the new town of Złoczew.

In the 18th century, the first synagogue was built in Złoczew.

=== 19th and early 20th centuries ===
After the Partitions of Poland and Napoleonic Wars, from 1815 the town was part of the Congress Poland within the Russian Partition of Poland.

The last Battle of Złoczew was fought on 22 August 1863 by a unit of pro-independence General Edmund Taczanowski on the fields between Złoczew and Kamionka. The defeat of the Polish forces ended the independence movement in the area.

Poland restored independence after World War I in 1918 and in 1919 Złoczew's municipal rights were restored by the Polish administration. In the interwar period, it was administratively located in the Łódź Voivodeship of Poland. According to the 1921 census, the town had a population of 4,904, of which 73.5% declared Polish nationality and 26.5% declared Jewish nationality.

=== World War II ===
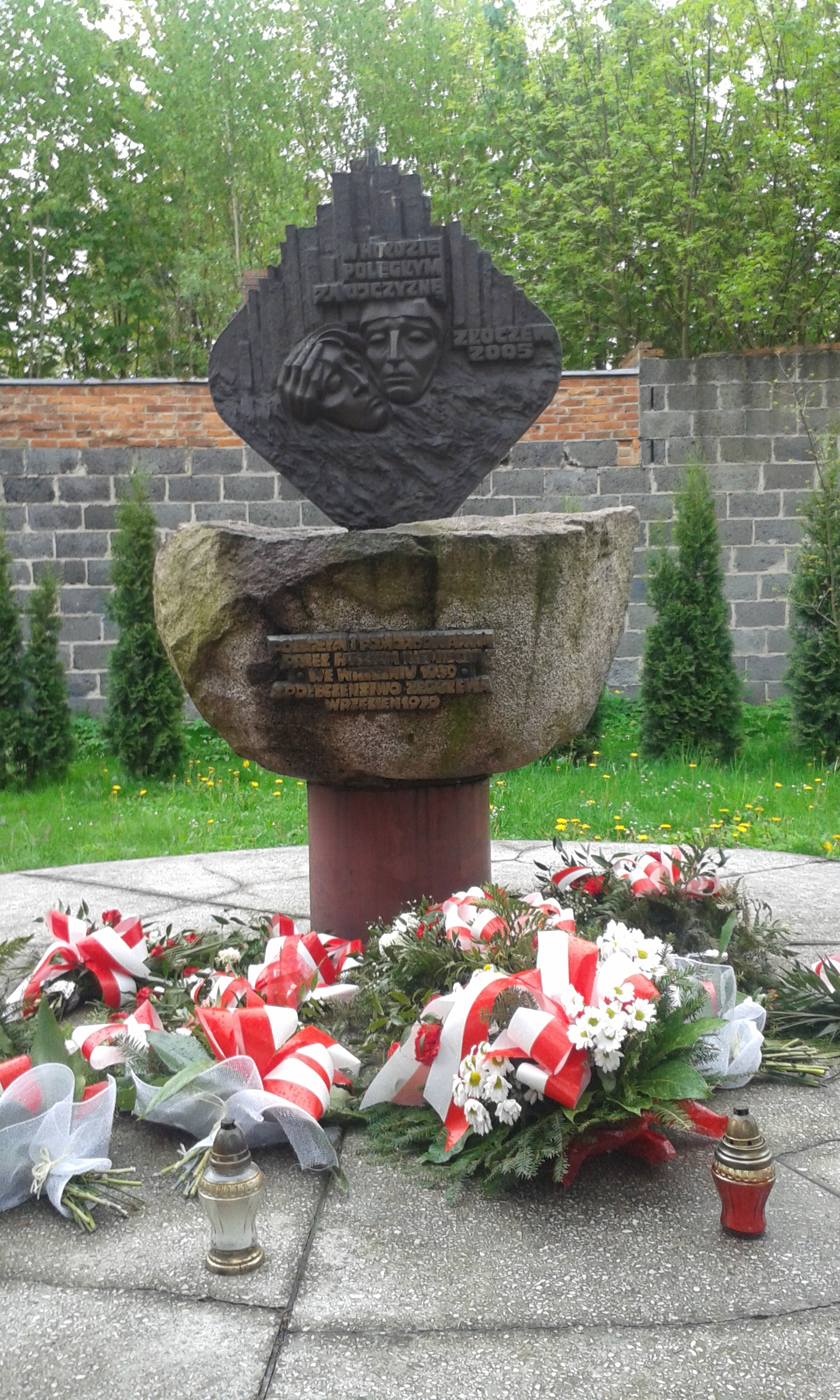
Monument to those murdered by the Germans in September 1939

The German invasion of Poland, which started World War II, began on 1 September 1939 and the Wehrmacht entered Złoczew on 4 September 1939, when German soldiers from the Leibstandarte SS Adolf Hitler (LSSAH), together with the soldiers of the 17th Wehrmacht Infantry Division, killed about 200 residents of the city, both Christians and Jews. Eighty percent of the city, around 240 houses, businesses, and government buildings, were subsequently burned, and imagery of Złoczew's burning by the Wehrmacht was used in Nazi war films displayed in the first week of the war in the cinemas of the Third Reich. The victims included both residents of Złoczew and refugees from the neighboring village. After the war, investigators identified 71 victims, of which 58 came from Złoczew.

The Germans began to terrorize the Jews, kidnapping them for forced labor, and then at the end of 1939, forcing many to leave the town. Most of those who left went to Lublin or Warsaw. Some fled east across the Soviet border. In late 1939, the Germans also expelled many Poles, including families of the mayor, parish priest, teachers, doctors, notaries, merchants and pharmacy owner. Further expulsions of Poles were carried out in March 1941 and April 1944. In March 1941 hundreds of Poles were expelled and deported to a transit camp in Łódź, where they were held for several weeks and subjected to brutal searches. Poles were then deported to the General Government (German-occupied central Poland). In November 1941, in Złoczew Germans conducted segregation of nearly 800 Poles expelled from nearby villages, who were then deported to slave labor either to Germany or to German colonists in occupied Poland. In April 1944, the Germans expelled 184 Poles, who were then deported to forced labor in Germany and German-occupied France. Each time the expellees' houses were handed over to German colonists as part of the Lebensraum policy. The Germans operated a prison in Złoczew that was subordinate to the prison in Sieradz. In 1940, the Germans forced the remaining Jews into a ghetto and brought several hundred Jews from neighboring villages there too. In all, about 2,500 Jews lived in the ghetto. Early in 1942, about 100 men and teen aged boys were sent to forced labor camps. In May or June 1942, the remaining residents, probably more than 2000, were assembled in a local church where they were held for several days with minimum food and water. They were forced into trucks and taken to Chełmno extermination camp where they were immediately gassed. There were no survivors from this last round up and perhaps 20 Jewish survivors in total from Złoczew.

During the war, Złoczew was extremely damaged and deserted. The center of town has never been rebuilt, and its population has never recovered to prewar numbers.

== Architectural monuments ==
A Bernardine monastery complex was built in 1603-07. From 1608 to 1864 the only residents of the monastery were Bernardine monks. In 1683-92 the complex was expanded. The monastery was destroyed twice by fire, in 1719 and in 1808. From 1949 Camaldolese nuns lived there. On 6 May 1986 the monastery was officially granted to Camaldolese nuns and became their property.

The Church of St. Cross dates from the late renaissance. During the Second World War the Germans rebuilt the building by removing arcades and converted it into a prison. After the war the palace hosted a primary school and secondary school dormitory. After Polish accession to the European Union the palace was renovated and is the headquarters of the town and commune of Złoczew.

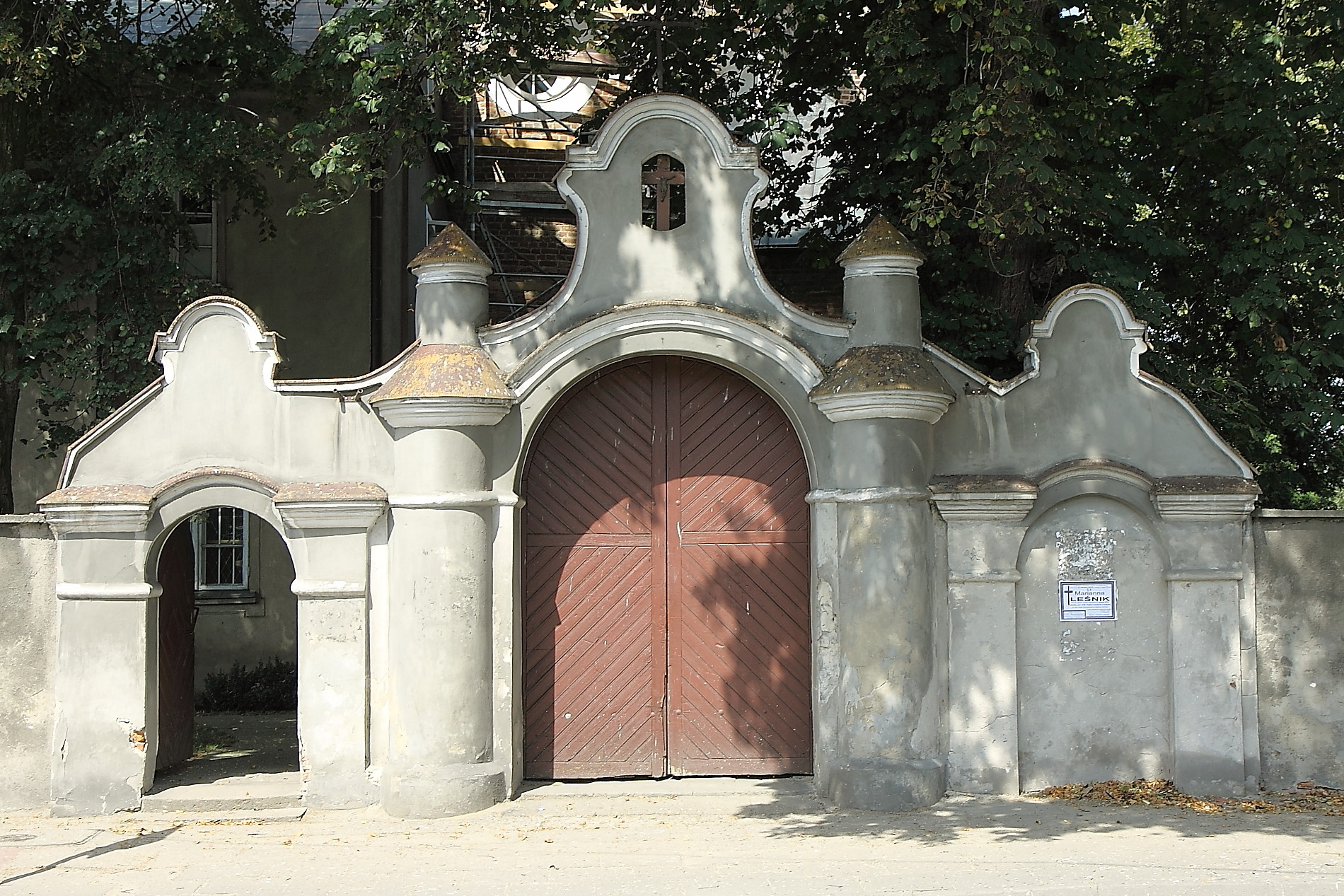
Entrance gate to the Monastery

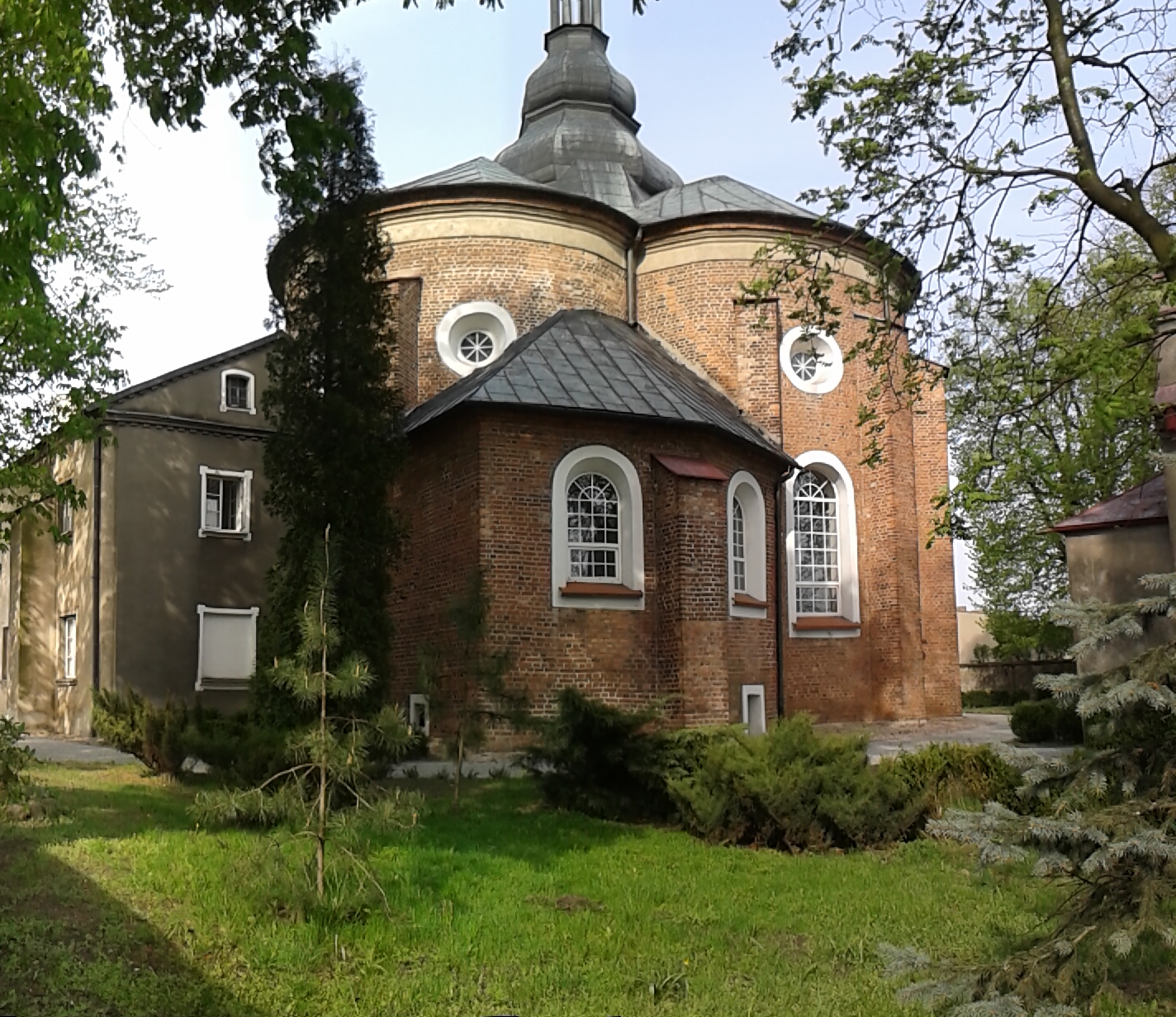
Renaissance Holy Cross Church

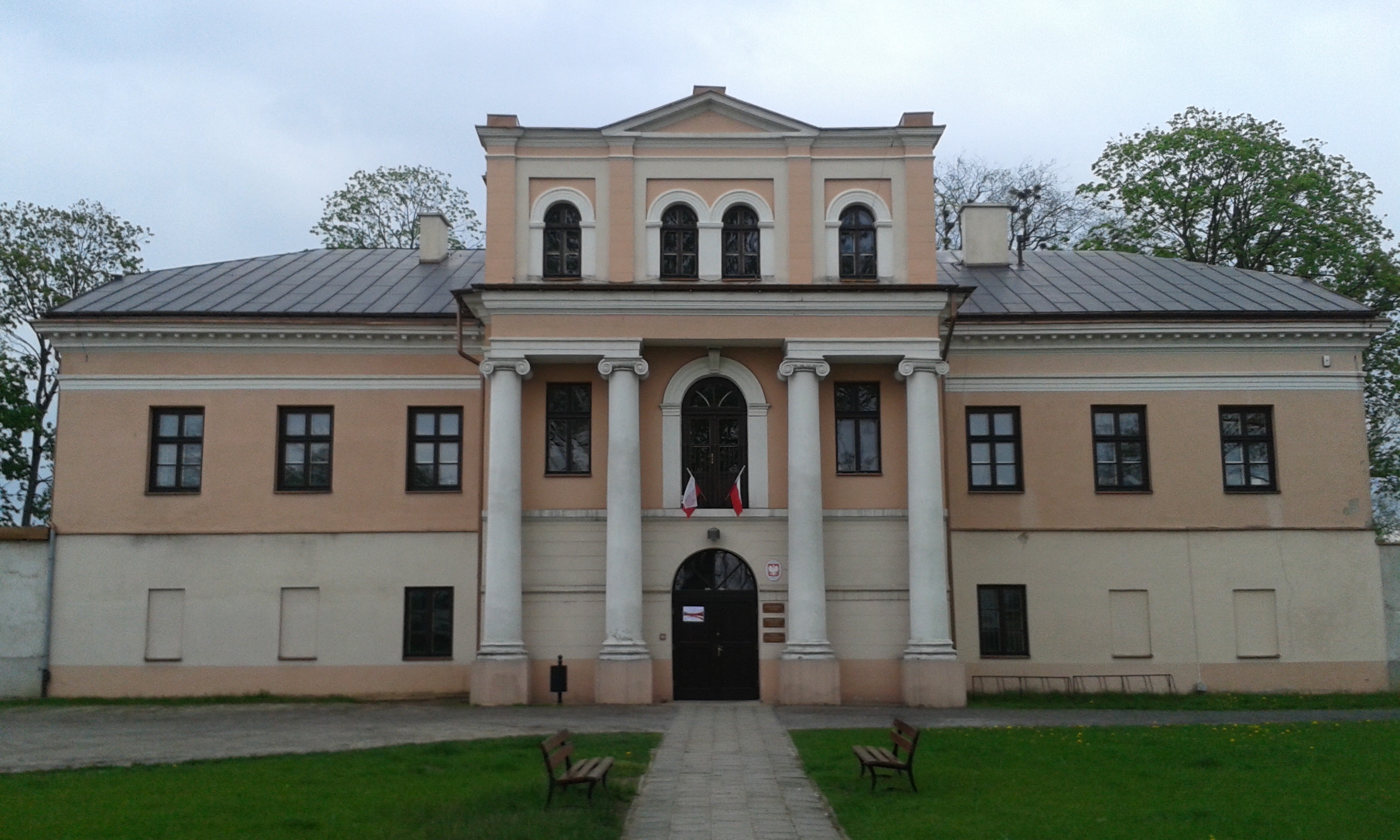
Ruszkowski Palace

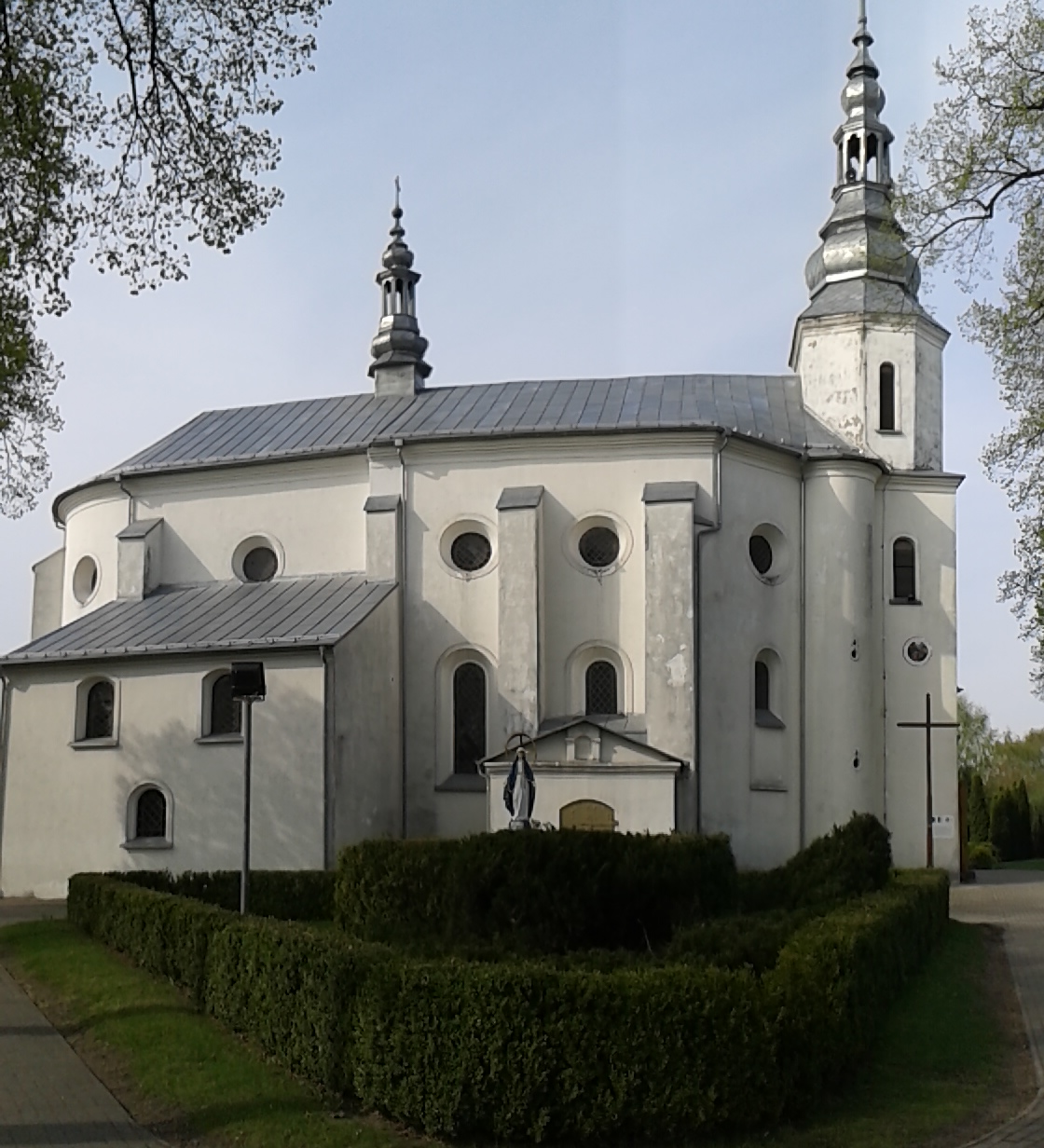
Renaissance St. Andrew Church

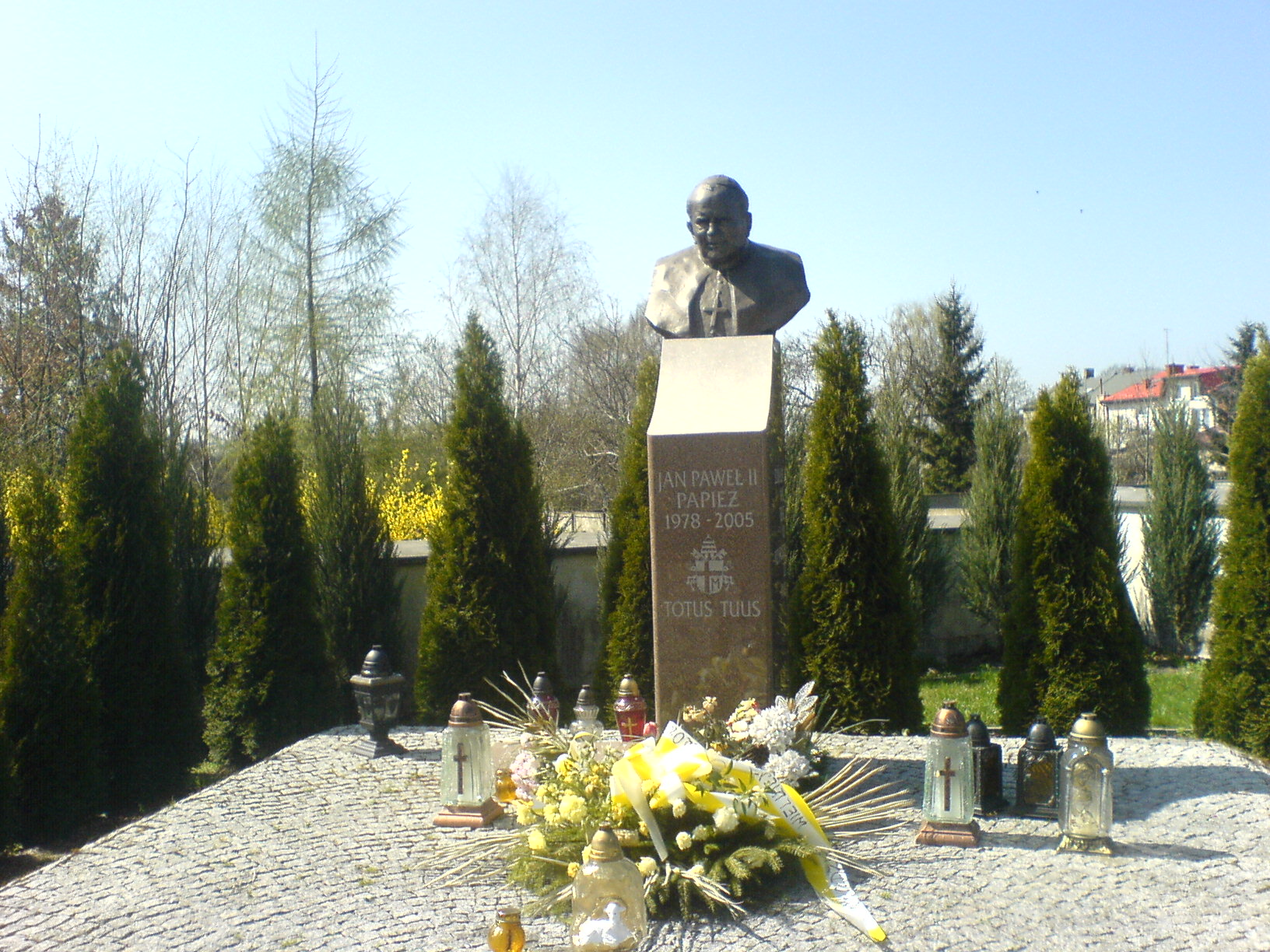
Monument of Pope John Paul II near the Holy Cross Church

== Notable people associated with Złoczew ==
- Jarosława Lewicka (born 1935), the last living recipient of the Righteous Among the Nations award from Yad Vashem to reside in Israel

== Transport ==
The S8 expressway bypasses Złoczew to the south. Złoczew exit of the expressway provides for quick access to Warsaw and to Wrocław.

Vovoideship roads 482 and 477 intersect in the town.

The nearest railway station is to the south in Wieluń.
