= Samborz =

Samborz may refer to the following places in Poland:

- Samborz, Lower Silesian Voivodeship
- Samborz, West Pomeranian Voivodeship
- Sambórz, Łódź Voivodeship
- Sambórz, Masovian Voivodeship
