= Strzałki =

Strzałki may refer to the following places:

- Strzałki, Łódź Voivodeship (central Poland)
- Strzałki, Gostynin County in Masovian Voivodeship (central Poland)
- Strzałki, Grójec County in Masovian Voivodeship (east-central Poland)
- Strzałki, Ostrołęka County in Masovian Voivodeship (east-central Poland)
