= Krępica, Łódź Voivodeship =

Krępica
- Village
- Location within Poland
- Coordinates: 51°29′36″N 18°47′32″E
- Country: Poland
- Voivodeship: Łódź
- County: Sieradz
- Gmina: Burzenin

Krępica [krɛmˈpit͡sa] is a village in the administrative district of Gmina Burzenin, within Sieradz County, Łódź Voivodeship, in central Poland.
