= Marianów, Gmina Burzenin =

Marianów
- Village
- Location within Poland
- Coordinates: 51°25′59″N 18°42′8″E
- Country: Poland
- Voivodeship: Łódź
- County: Sieradz
- Gmina: Burzenin
- Population: 88

Marianów [maˈrjanuf] is a village in the administrative district of Gmina Burzenin, within Sieradz County, Łódź Voivodeship, in central Poland.
