= Gmina Burzenin =

Gmina Burzenin Burzenin Commune
- Gmina
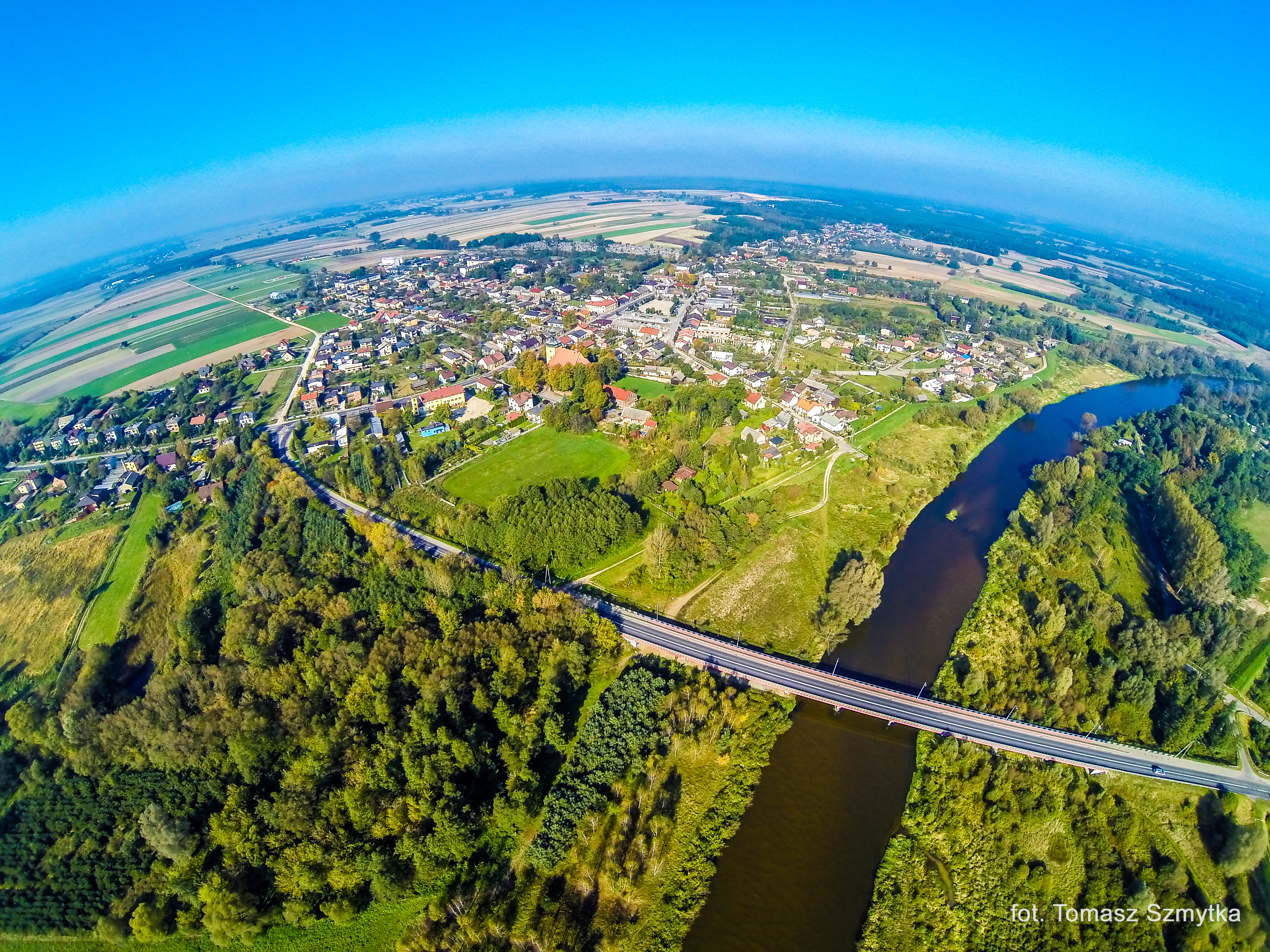

- Flag Coat of arms
- Interactive map of Gmina Burzenin
- Coordinates (Burzenin): 51°27′37″N 18°49′48″E
- Country: Poland
- Voivodeship: Łódź
- County: Sieradz
- Seat: Burzenin

Area
  - Total: 118.96 km^{2} (45.93 sq mi)

Population (2006)
  - Total: 5,665
  - Density: 47.62/km^{2} (123.3/sq mi)
- Car plates: ESI
- Website: www.ugburzenin.home.pl

Gmina Burzenin is a rural gmina (administrative district) in Sieradz County, Łódź Voivodeship, in central Poland. Its seat is the village of Burzenin, which lies approximately 17 kilometres (11 mi) south of Sieradz and 57 km (35 mi) south-west of the regional capital Łódź.

The gmina covers an area of 118.96 square kilometres (45.9 sq mi), and as of 2006 its total population is 5,665.

The gmina contains part of the protected area called Warta-Widawka Landscape Park.

== Villages ==
Gmina Burzenin contains the villages and settlements of:

- Antonin
- Będków
- Biadaczew
- Brzeźnica
- Burzenin
- Działy
- Grabówka
- Gronów
- Jarocice
- Kamilew
- Kamionka
- Kolonia Niechmirów
- Kopanina
- Krępica
- Ligota
- Majaczewice
- Marianów
- Niechmirów
- Nieczuj
- Prażmów
- Redzeń Drugi
- Redzeń Pierwszy
- Ręszew
- Rokitowiec
- Sambórz
- Strumiany
- Strzałki
- Świerki
- Szczawno
- Tyczyn
- Waszkowskie
- Witów
- Wola Będkowska
- Wola Majacka
- Wolnica Grabowska
- Wolnica Niechmirowska

== Neighbouring gminas ==
Gmina Burzenin is bordered by the gminas of Brzeźnio, Konopnica, Sieradz, Widawa, Zapolice and Złoczew.
