= Redzeń Pierwszy =

- Village
- Location within Poland
- Coordinates: 51°29′50″N 18°49′20″E
- Country: Poland
- Voivodeship: Łódź
- County: Sieradz
- Gmina: Burzenin

Redzeń Pierwszy [ˈrɛd͡zɛɲ ˈpjɛrfʂɨ] is a village in the administrative district of Gmina Burzenin, within Sieradz County, Łódź Voivodeship, in central Poland.
