= Brzeźnica, Łódź Voivodeship =

Brzeźnica
- Village
- Location within Poland
- Coordinates: 51°26′0″N 18°46′0″E
- Country: Poland
- Voivodeship: Łódź
- County: Sieradz
- Gmina: Burzenin
- Population: 145

Brzeźnica [bʐɛʑˈnit͡sa] is a village in the administrative district of Gmina Burzenin, within Sieradz County, Łódź Voivodeship, in central Poland.
