= Ligota, Sieradz County =

Ligota
- Village
- Location within Poland
- Coordinates: 51°29′14″N 18°50′39″E
- Country: Poland
- Voivodeship: Łódź
- County: Sieradz
- Gmina: Burzenin
- Population: 246

Ligota [liˈɡɔta] is a village in the administrative district of Gmina Burzenin, within Sieradz County, Łódź Voivodeship, in central Poland.
