= Rokitowiec =

- Village
- Location within Poland
- Coordinates: 51°24′52″N 18°42′29″E
- Country: Poland
- Voivodeship: Łódź
- County: Sieradz
- Gmina: Burzenin

Rokitowiec [rɔkiˈtɔvjɛt͡s] is a village in the administrative district of Gmina Burzenin, within Sieradz County, Łódź Voivodeship, in central Poland.
