= Majaczewice =

- Village
- Location within Poland
- Coordinates: 51°25′55″N 18°48′5″E
- Country: Poland
- Voivodeship: Łódź
- County: Sieradz
- Gmina: Burzenin
- Population: 188

Majaczewice [majat͡ʂɛˈvit͡sɛ] is a village in the administrative district of Gmina Burzenin, within Sieradz County, Łódź Voivodeship, in central Poland.
