= Antonin, Sieradz County =

Antonin
- Village
- Location within Poland
- Coordinates: 51°28′6″N 18°51′0″E
- Country: Poland
- Voivodeship: Łódź
- County: Sieradz
- Gmina: Burzenin
- Population: 120

Antonin (Polish pronunciation: [anˈtɔɲin]) is a village in the administrative district of Gmina Burzenin, within Sieradz County, Łódź Voivodeship, in central Poland.
