= Grabówka, Łódź Voivodeship =

Grabówka
- Village
- Location within Poland
- Coordinates: 51°25′42″N 18°44′26″E
- Country: Poland
- Voivodeship: Łódź
- County: Sieradz
- Gmina: Burzenin
- Population: 163

Grabówka [ɡraˈbufka] is a village in the administrative district of Gmina Burzenin, within Sieradz County, Łódź Voivodeship, in central Poland.
