= Jarocice =

- Village
- Location within Poland
- Coordinates: 51°25′10″N 18°48′0″E
- Country: Poland
- Voivodeship: Łódź
- County: Sieradz
- Gmina: Burzenin
- Population: 167

Jarocice [jarɔˈt͡ɕit͡sɛ] is a village in the administrative district of Gmina Burzenin, within Sieradz County, Łódź Voivodeship, in central Poland.
