= Kopanina, Sieradz County =

Kopanina
- Village
- Location within Poland
- Coordinates: 51°28′31″N 18°48′49″E
- Country: Poland
- Voivodeship: Łódź
- County: Sieradz
- Gmina: Burzenin

Kopanina [kɔpaˈnina] is a village in the administrative district of Gmina Burzenin, within Sieradz County, Łódź Voivodeship, in central Poland.
