= Wolnica Niechmirowska =

- Village
- Location within Poland
- Coordinates: 51°22′15″N 18°44′57″E
- Country: Poland
- Voivodeship: Łódź
- County: Sieradz
- Gmina: Burzenin
- Population: 168

Wolnica Niechmirowska [vɔlˈnit͡sa ɲɛxmiˈrɔfska] is a village in the administrative district of Gmina Burzenin, within Sieradz County, Łódź Voivodeship, in central Poland.
