= Szczawno, Łódź Voivodeship =

Szczawno
- Village
- Location within Poland
- Coordinates: 51°26′23″N 18°47′34″E
- Country: Poland
- Voivodeship: Łódź
- County: Sieradz
- Gmina: Burzenin
- Population: 252

Szczawno [ˈʂt͡ʂavnɔ] is a village in the administrative district of Gmina Burzenin, within Sieradz County, Łódź Voivodeship, in central Poland.
