= Ręszew =

- Village
- Location within Poland
- Coordinates: 51°26′45″N 18°43′31″E
- Country: Poland
- Voivodeship: Łódź
- County: Sieradz
- Gmina: Burzenin

Ręszew [ˈrɛ̃ʂɛf] is a village in the administrative district of Gmina Burzenin, within Sieradz County, Łódź Voivodeship, in central Poland.
