= Działy, Sieradz County =

Działy
- Village
- Location within Poland
- Coordinates: 51°28′3″N 18°48′0″E
- Country: Poland
- Voivodeship: Łódź
- County: Sieradz
- Gmina: Burzenin

Działy [ˈd͡ʑawɨ] is a village in the administrative district of Gmina Burzenin, within Sieradz County, Łódź Voivodeship, in central Poland.
