= Wola Będkowska =

- Village
- Location within Poland
- Coordinates: 51°29′0″N 18°45′20″E
- Country: Poland
- Voivodeship: Łódź
- County: Sieradz
- Gmina: Burzenin
- Population: 252

Wola Będkowska [ˈvɔla bɛntˈkɔfska] is a village in the administrative district of Gmina Burzenin, within Sieradz County, Łódź Voivodeship, in central Poland.
