= Kolonia Niechmirów =

Village in Gmina Burzenin, Poland

- Village
- Location within Poland
- Coordinates: 51°24′28″N 18°45′58″E
- Country: Poland
- Voivodeship: Łódź
- County: Sieradz
- Gmina: Burzenin

Kolonia Niechmirów [kɔˈlɔɲa ɲɛxˈmiruf] is a village in the administrative district of Gmina Burzenin, within Sieradz County, Łódź Voivodeship, in central Poland.
