= Gronów, Łódź Voivodeship =

Gronów
- Village
- Location within Poland
- Coordinates: 51°24′44″N 18°43′21″E
- Country: Poland
- Voivodeship: Łódź
- County: Sieradz
- Gmina: Burzenin
- Population: 187

Gronów [ˈɡrɔnuf] is a village in the administrative district of Gmina Burzenin, within Sieradz County, Łódź Voivodeship, in central Poland.
