= Burzenin =

- Village
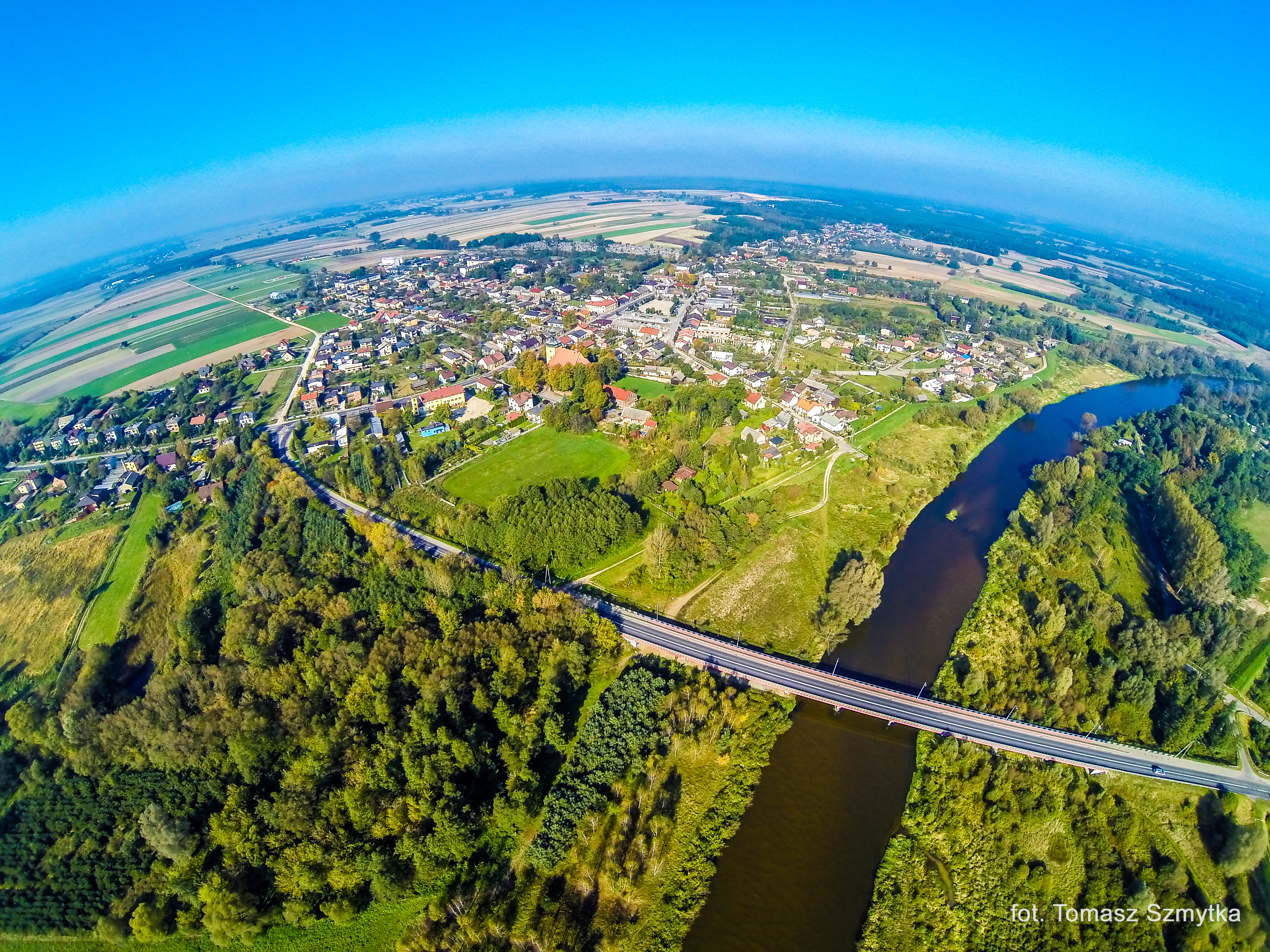
- Aerial view of Burzenin

- Location within Poland
- Coordinates: 51°27′37″N 18°49′48″E
- Country: Poland
- Voivodeship: Łódź
- County: Sieradz
- Gmina: Burzenin
- First mentioned: 1344

Population (approx.)
  - Total: 1,100
- Time zone: UTC+1 (CET)
  - Summer (DST): UTC+2 (CEST)
- Vehicle registration: ESI

Burzenin [buˈʐɛnin] is a village in Sieradz County, Łódź Voivodeship, in central Poland. It is the seat of the gmina (administrative district) called Gmina Burzenin. It is located in the Sieradz Land.

== History ==
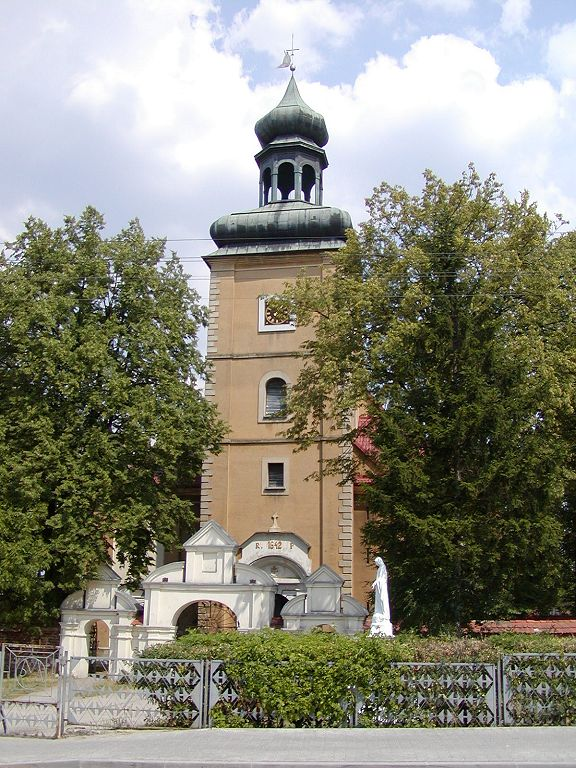
Church of Saints Adalbert and Stanislaus

The settlement dates back to medieval Piast-ruled Poland. It was first mentioned in documents in 1344, and was granted town rights before 1378. It was a private town, administratively located in the Sieradz County in the Sieradz Voivodeship in the Greater Poland Province of the Kingdom of Poland. In the 1640s, Bishop of Chełm Stanisław Pstrokoński erected the Baroque Church of Saints Adalbert and Stanislaus, which remains one of the most valuable historic heritage sites of Burzenin. There was also a shelter for the poor and a primary school in Burzenin. A synod of the Unity of the Brethren was held in the town in 1651.

The town was annexed by Prussia in the Second Partition of Poland in 1793. In 1807 it was regained by Poles and included within the short-lived Polish Duchy of Warsaw, and after its dissolution, in 1815, it became part of so-called Congress Poland within the Russian Partition of Poland. Following the unsuccessful Polish January Uprising, the Russian administration deprived Burzenin of its town rights in 1870. In the late 19th century, it had a population of around 1,000. In 1918, Poland regained independence, and the settlement was immediately reintegrated with Poland.

Following the joint German-Soviet invasion of Poland, which started World War II in September 1939, the settlement was occupied by Germany until 1945. The Germans operated a Nazi prison in Burzenin that was subordinate to the prison in Sieradz. In 1941, the Germans carried out mass expulsions of Poles, who were then deported to forced labour in nearby counties.
