= Wola Majacka =

- Village
- Location within Poland
- Coordinates: 51°26′46″N 18°46′00″E
- Country: Poland
- Voivodeship: Łódź
- County: Sieradz
- Gmina: Burzenin

Wola Majacka [ˈvɔla maˈjat͡ska] is a village in the administrative district of Gmina Burzenin, within Sieradz County, Łódź Voivodeship, in central Poland.
