= Będków, Sieradz County =

Będków
- Village
- Location within Poland
- Coordinates: 51°28′13″N 18°45′8″E
- Country: Poland
- Voivodeship: Łódź
- County: Sieradz
- Gmina: Burzenin
- Population: 125

Będków [ˈbɛntkuf] is a village in the administrative district of Gmina Burzenin, within Sieradz County, Łódź Voivodeship, in central Poland.
