= Nieczuj =

- Village
- Location within Poland
- Coordinates: 51°25′12″N 18°45′29″E
- Country: Poland
- Voivodeship: Łódź
- County: Sieradz
- Gmina: Burzenin
- Population: 107

Nieczuj [ˈɲɛt͡ʂui̯] is a village in the administrative district of Gmina Burzenin, within Sieradz County, Łódź Voivodeship, in central Poland.
