= Witów, Gmina Burzenin =

Witów
- Village
- Location within Poland
- Coordinates: 51°28′10″N 18°49′50″E
- Country: Poland
- Voivodeship: Łódź
- County: Sieradz
- Gmina: Burzenin
- Population: 649

Witów [ˈvituf] is a village in the administrative district of Gmina Burzenin, within Sieradz County, Łódź Voivodeship, in central Poland.
