= Wolnica Grabowska =

- Village
- Location within Poland
- Coordinates: 51°26′30″N 18°44′46″E
- Country: Poland
- Voivodeship: Łódź
- County: Sieradz
- Gmina: Burzenin
- Population: 107

Wolnica Grabowska [vɔlˈnit͡sa ɡraˈbɔfska] is a village in the administrative district of Gmina Burzenin, within Sieradz County, Łódź Voivodeship, in central Poland.
