= Kamilew, Sieradz County =

Kamilew
- Village
- Location within Poland
- Coordinates: 51°26′20″N 18°42′51″E
- Country: Poland
- Voivodeship: Łódź
- County: Sieradz
- Gmina: Burzenin

Kamilew [kaˈmilɛf] is a village in the administrative district of Gmina Burzenin, within Sieradz County, Łódź Voivodeship, in central Poland.
