= Tyczyn, Łódź Voivodeship =

Tyczyn
- Village
- Location within Poland
- Coordinates: 51°30′35″N 18°51′4″E
- Country: Poland
- Voivodeship: Łódź
- County: Sieradz
- Gmina: Burzenin
- Population: 207

Tyczyn [ˈtɨt͡ʂɨn] is a village in the administrative district of Gmina Burzenin, within Sieradz County, Łódź Voivodeship, in central Poland.
