= Kamionka, Sieradz County =

Kamionka
- Village
- Location within Poland
- Coordinates: 51°24′18″N 18°44′31″E
- Country: Poland
- Voivodeship: Łódź
- County: Sieradz
- Gmina: Burzenin
- Population: 253

Kamionka [kaˈmjɔnka] is a village in the administrative district of Gmina Burzenin, within Sieradz County, Łódź Voivodeship, in central Poland.
