= Prażmów, Łódź Voivodeship =

Prażmów
- Village
- Location within Poland
- Coordinates: 51°28′19″N 18°47′23″E
- Country: Poland
- Voivodeship: Łódź
- County: Sieradz
- Gmina: Burzenin
- Population: 285

Prażmów [ˈpraʐmuf] is a village in the administrative district of Gmina Burzenin, within Sieradz County, Łódź Voivodeship, in central Poland.
