= Strzałki, Łódź Voivodeship =

Strzałki
- Village
- Location within Poland
- Coordinates: 51°27′32″N 18°47′3″E
- Country: Poland
- Voivodeship: Łódź
- County: Sieradz
- Gmina: Burzenin
- Population: 326

Strzałki [ˈstʂau̯ki] is a village in the administrative district of Gmina Burzenin, within Sieradz County, Łódź Voivodeship, in central Poland.
