= Świerki, Łódź Voivodeship =

Świerki
- Village
- Location within Poland
- Coordinates: 51°28′43″N 18°44′0″E
- Country: Poland
- Voivodeship: Łódź
- County: Sieradz
- Gmina: Burzenin
- Population: 61

Świerki (Polish pronunciation: [ˈɕfjɛrkʲi]) is a village in the administrative district of Gmina Burzenin, within Sieradz County, Łódź Voivodeship, in central Poland.
