= Niechmirów =

- Village
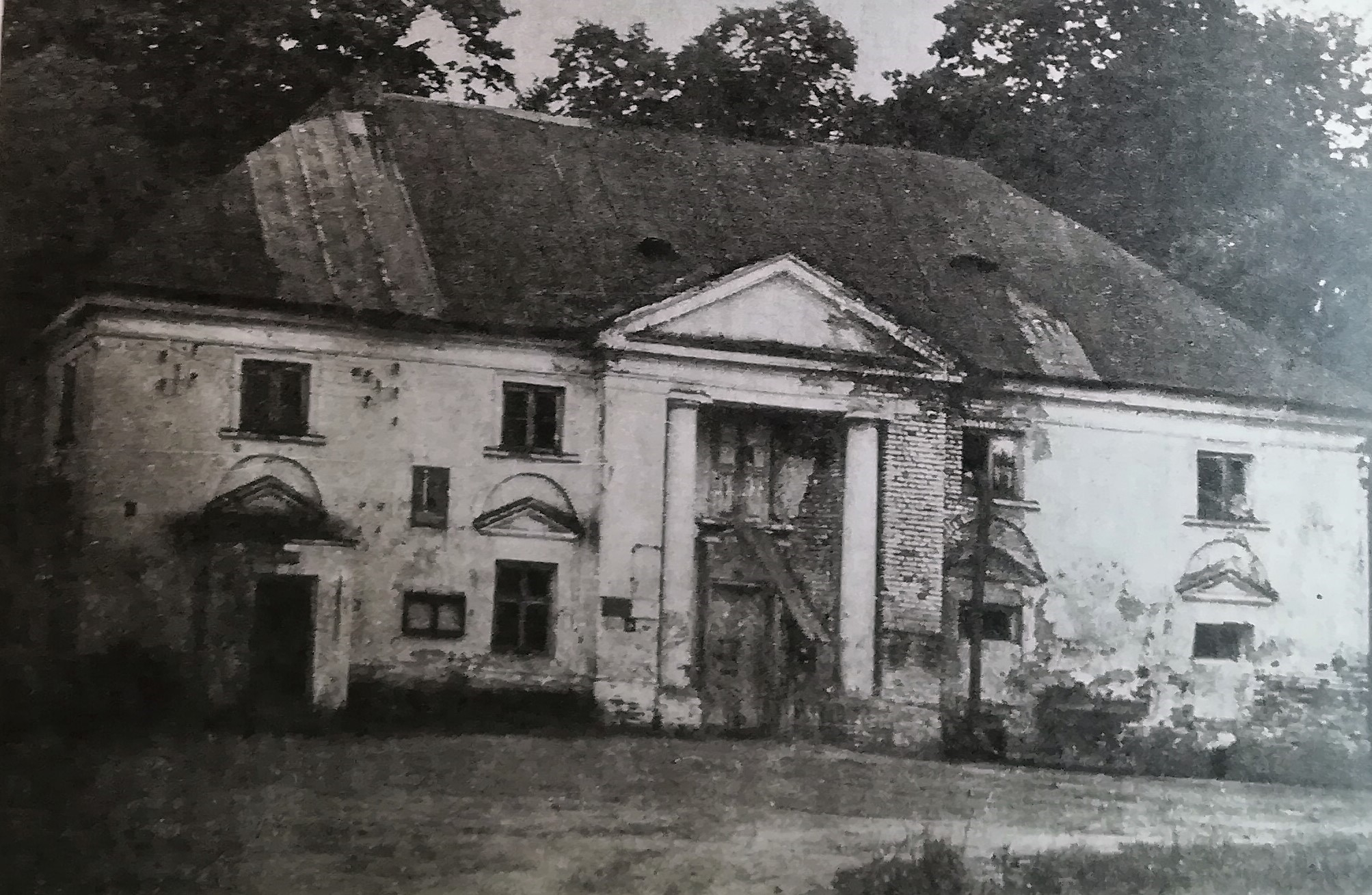
- Granary

- Location within Poland
- Coordinates: 51°23′28″N 18°45′53″E
- Country: Poland
- Voivodeship: Łódź
- County: Sieradz
- Gmina: Burzenin
- Population: 361
- Time zone: UTC+1 (CET)
  - Summer (DST): UTC+2 (CEST)
- Vehicle registration: ESI

Niechmirów [ɲɛxˈmiruf] is a village in the administrative district of Gmina Burzenin, within Sieradz County, Łódź Voivodeship, in central Poland.

During the German occupation of Poland (World War II), the German Nazi government operated a prison in Niechmirów that was subordinate to the prison in Sieradz. In 1941, the Germans expelled the entire Polish population of the village.
