= Sambórz, Łódź Voivodeship =

Sambórz
- Village
- Location within Poland
- Coordinates: 51°28′4″N 18°48′50″E
- Country: Poland
- Voivodeship: Łódź
- County: Sieradz
- Gmina: Burzenin

Sambórz [ˈsambuʂ] is a village in the administrative district of Gmina Burzenin, within Sieradz County, Łódź Voivodeship, in central Poland.
