= Ukleja =

Ukleja may refer to:

- Ukleja (river), a river in Poland
- Mick Ukleja (born 1948), American author
