= Wkra (disambiguation) =

Wkra is a river in north-eastern Poland.

Wkra may also refer to:

- Uecker (Polish: Wkra), a river in Germany
- Wkra (river), a tributary of the Mołstowa in Poland
- Wkra, Masovian Voivodeship, a village in Poland
- Wkra railway station
- WKRA (AM), a radio station (1110 AM) licensed to Holly Springs, Mississippi, United States
- WKRA-FM, a radio station (92.7 FM) licensed to Holly Springs, Mississippi, United States
