= Bielawa (disambiguation) =

Bielawa is a town in Dzierżoniów County, Lower Silesian Voivodeship, in south-west Poland.

Bielawa may also refer to the following places in Poland:

- Bielawa, Wrocław County in Lower Silesian Voivodeship (south-west Poland)
- Bielawa, Greater Poland Voivodeship (west-central Poland)
- Bielawa, Masovian Voivodeship (east-central Poland)

Bielawa can be a Surname

- Herbert Bielawa, American composer and professor of music
- Lisa Bielawa (born 1968), American composer and vocalist

== See also ==
- Bielawa Dolna
- Bielawa Górna
- Bielawy (disambiguation)
