= Bartoszewice =

Bartoszewice refers to the following places in Poland:

- Bartoszewice, Greater Poland Voivodeship
- Bartoszewice, Kuyavian-Pomeranian Voivodeship
