= Wiewiórki =

Wiewiórki may refer to the following places:

- Wiewiórki, Kuyavian-Pomeranian Voivodeship (north-central Poland)
- Wiewiórki, Warmian-Masurian Voivodeship (north Poland)
- Wiewiórki, West Pomeranian Voivodeship (north-west Poland)
