= Plachawy =

Plachawy may refer to the following places in Poland:

- Pląchawy, Warmian-Masurian Voivodeship (north Poland)
- Płąchawy, Kuyavian-Pomeranian Voivodeship (north-central Poland)
