= Sąpólna =

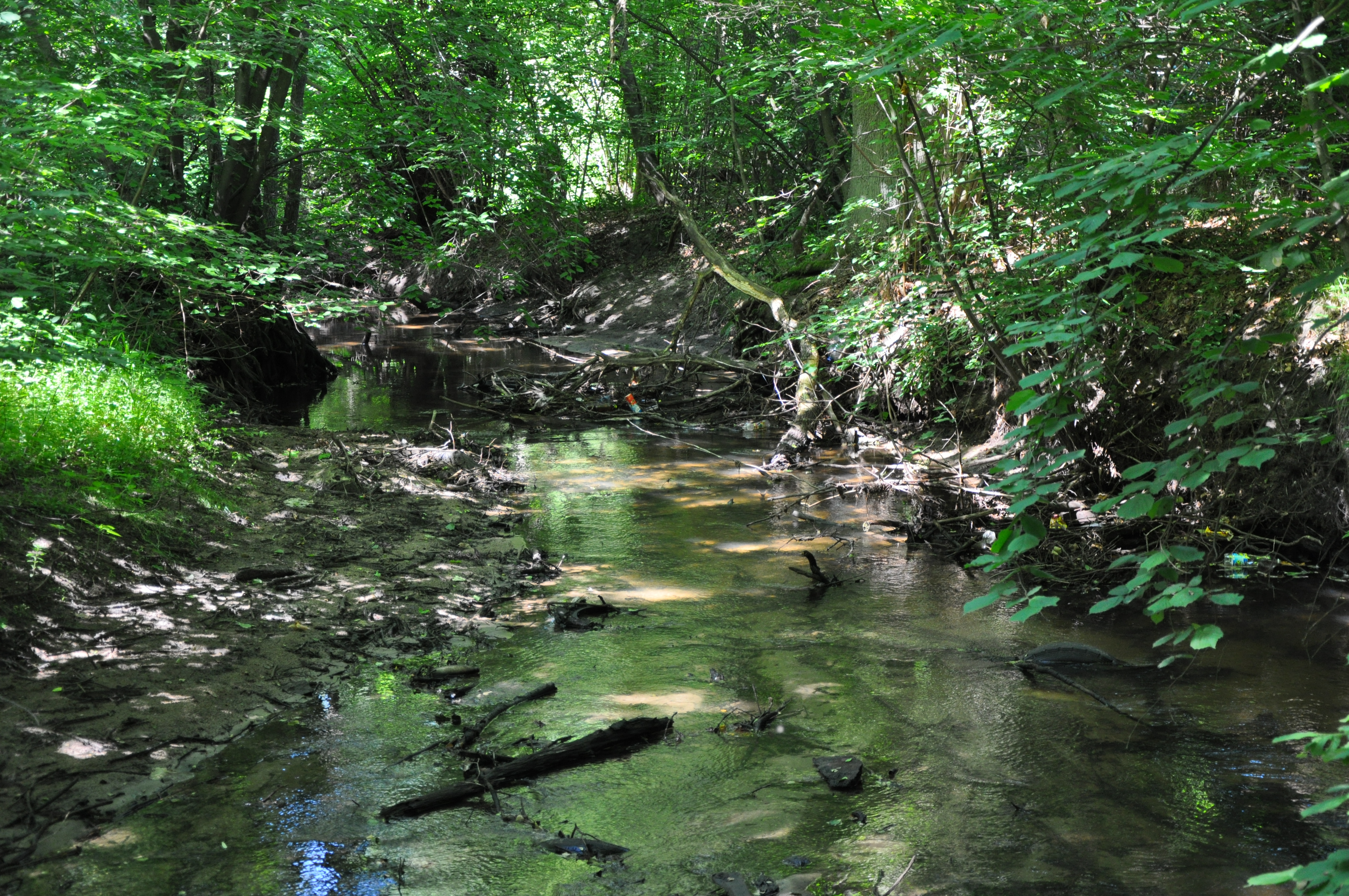
- Sąpólna during the dry season

Location
- Country: Poland
- Voivodeship: West Pomeranian

Physical characteristics
- Source
  - location: southwest of Bagna, Goleniów County
  - coordinates: 53°31′59″N 15°09′26″E
- Mouth: Ukleja
  - location: southwest of Taczały, Łobez County
  - coordinates: 53°44′36″N 15°15′51″E
- Length: 60.08 km (37.33 mi)
- Basin size: 87.7 km^{2} (33.9 mi^{2})

Basin features
- Progression: Ukleja→ Rega→ Baltic Sea

Sąpólna is a river of Poland, a tributary of the Ukleja south of Płoty.
