= Bielawy =

Bielawy may refer to:

- Bielawy, Gmina Nakło nad Notecią in Kuyavian-Pomeranian Voivodeship (north-central Poland)
- Bielawy, Gmina Szubin in Kuyavian-Pomeranian Voivodeship (north-central Poland)
- Bielawy, Wąbrzeźno County in Kuyavian-Pomeranian Voivodeship (north-central Poland)
- Bielawy, Gmina Barcin in Kuyavian-Pomeranian Voivodeship (north-central Poland)
- Bielawy, Gmina Janowiec Wielkopolski in Kuyavian-Pomeranian Voivodeship (central Poland)
- Bielawy, Włocławek County in Kuyavian-Pomeranian Voivodeship (central Poland)
- Bielawy, Kutno County in Łódź Voivodeship (central Poland)
- Bielawy, Łęczyca County in Łódź Voivodeship (central Poland)
- Bielawy, Łowicz County in Łódź Voivodeship (central Poland)
- Bielawy, Wieruszów County in Łódź Voivodeship (central Poland)
- Bielawy, Ciechanów County in Masovian Voivodeship (east-central Poland)
- Bielawy, Gostynin County in Masovian Voivodeship (central Poland)
- Bielawy, Mława County in Masovian Voivodeship (north-central Poland)
- Bielawy, Gniezno County in Greater Poland Voivodeship (west-central Poland)
- Bielawy, Gmina Granowo, Grodzisk County in Greater Poland Voivodeship (west-central Poland)
- Bielawy, Kalisz County in Greater Poland Voivodeship (central Poland)
- Bielawy, Konin County in Greater Poland Voivodeship (central Poland)
- Bielawy, Kościan County in Greater Poland Voivodeship (west-central Poland)
- Bielawy, Leszno County in Greater Poland Voivodeship (west-central Poland)
- Bielawy, Pleszew County in Greater Poland Voivodeship (west-central Poland)
- Bielawy, Rawicz County in Greater Poland Voivodeship (west-central Poland)
- Bielawy, Gmina Słupca in Greater Poland Voivodeship (west-central Poland)
- Bielawy, Gmina Strzałkowo in Greater Poland Voivodeship (west-central Poland)
- Bielawy, Lubusz Voivodeship (west Poland)
- Bielawy, Bytów County in Pomeranian Voivodeship (north Poland)
- Bielawy, Chojnice County in Pomeranian Voivodeship (north Poland)
- Bielawy, Kartuzy County in Pomeranian Voivodeship (north Poland)
- Bielawy, Warmian-Masurian Voivodeship (north Poland)
