= Marian Kondratowicz =

Polish footballer (1941–2021)

Personal information
- Date of birth: 10 December 1941
- Date of death: 8 January 2021 (aged 79)
- Position(s): Goalkeeper

Senior career*
| Years | Team | Apps | (Gls) |
| 1963–1970 | Odra Opole | 25 | (0) |
- * Club domestic league appearances and goals

Marian Kondratowicz (10 December 1941 – 8 January 2021) was a Polish professional footballer who played as a goalkeeper.

Between the years 1963 and 1970, he made 25 appearances in the top division with Odra Opole, where competed for a place with Konrad Kornek.

He is considered one of Odra's all-time best goalkeepers.

He died on 8 January 2021 and was buried at the local cemetery 5 days later in Nowa Wieś Królewska.
