= Zygmuntowo =

Zygmuntowo may refer to the following places:

- Zygmuntowo, Gmina Glinojeck in Masovian Voivodeship (east-central Poland)
- Zygmuntowo, Gmina Opinogóra Górna in Masovian Voivodeship (east-central Poland)
- Zygmuntowo, Wyszków County in Masovian Voivodeship (east-central Poland)
- Zygmuntowo, Gmina Skulsk in Greater Poland Voivodeship (west-central Poland)
- Zygmuntowo, Gmina Wilczyn in Greater Poland Voivodeship (west-central Poland)
- Zygmuntowo, Kościan County in Greater Poland Voivodeship (west-central Poland)
- Zygmuntowo, Nowy Tomyśl County in Greater Poland Voivodeship (west-central Poland)
- Zygmuntowo, Rawicz County in Greater Poland Voivodeship (west-central Poland)
