= Wilkowa (river) =

Location
- Country: Poland

Physical characteristics
- Mouth
  - location: Piaskowa
  - coordinates: 53°56′09″N 15°28′25″E

Basin features
- Progression: Piaskowa→ Rega→ Baltic Sea

Wilkowa is a small river of Poland. It flows into the Piaskowa southwest of Resko.
