= Działy =

Działy may refer to the following places:

- Działy, Kutno County in Łódź Voivodeship (central Poland)
- Działy, Sieradz County in Łódź Voivodeship (central Poland)
- Działy, Wieluń County in Łódź Voivodeship (central Poland)
- Działy, Ciechanów County in Masovian Voivodeship (east-central Poland)
- Działy, Gostynin County in Masovian Voivodeship (east-central Poland)
- Działy, Warmian-Masurian Voivodeship (north Poland)
