= Nizica =

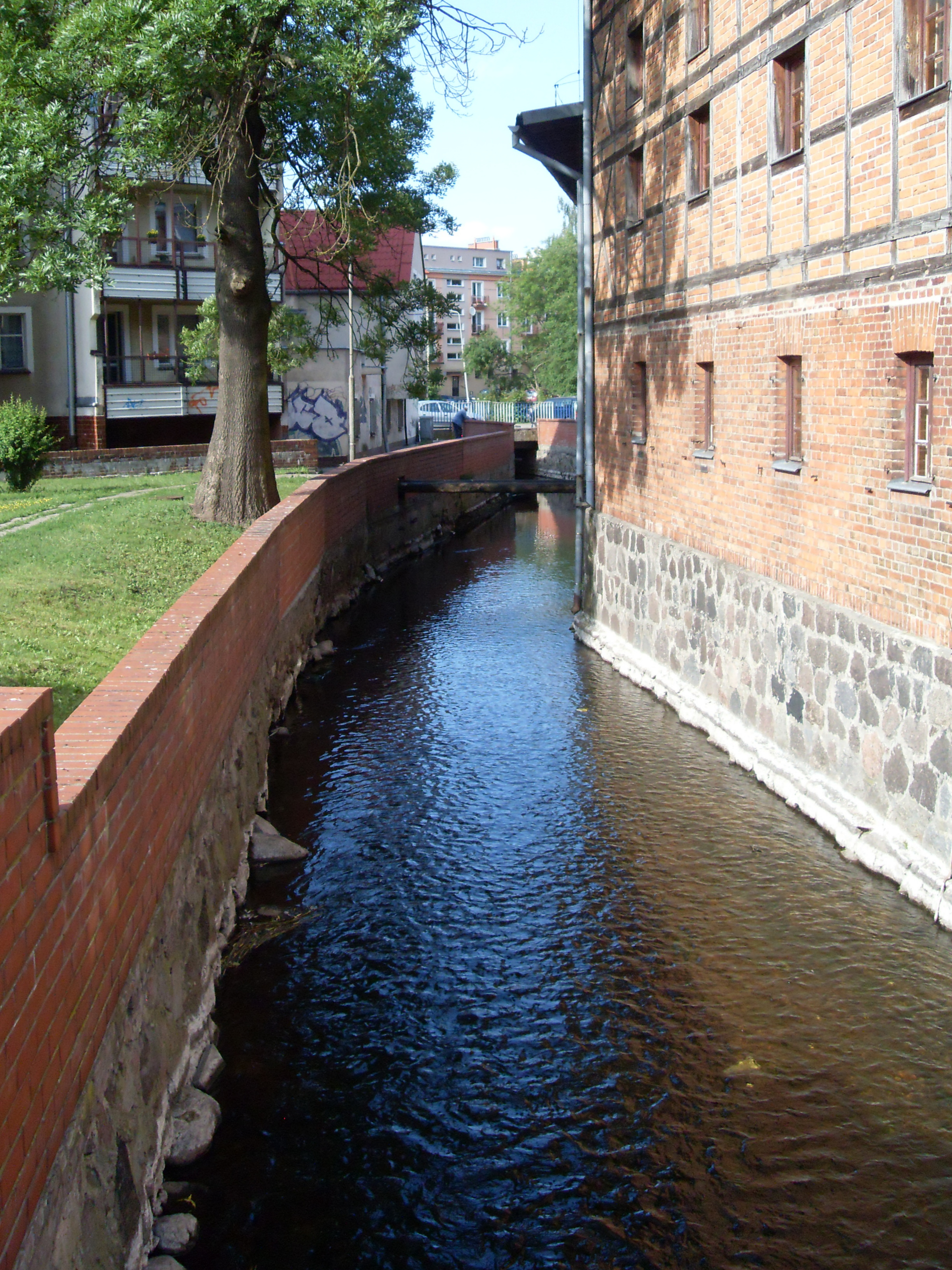

Location
- Country: Poland

Physical characteristics
- Mouth
  - location: lake Wielimie
  - coordinates: 53°43′21″N 16°42′30″E

Basin features
- Progression: Gwda→ Noteć→ Warta→ Oder→ Baltic Sea

Nizica is a short river in Szczecinek, Poland. It connects lake Trzesiecko with lake Wielimie, which is drained by the river Gwda.
