= Glinojeck =

Town in Masovian Voivodeship, Poland

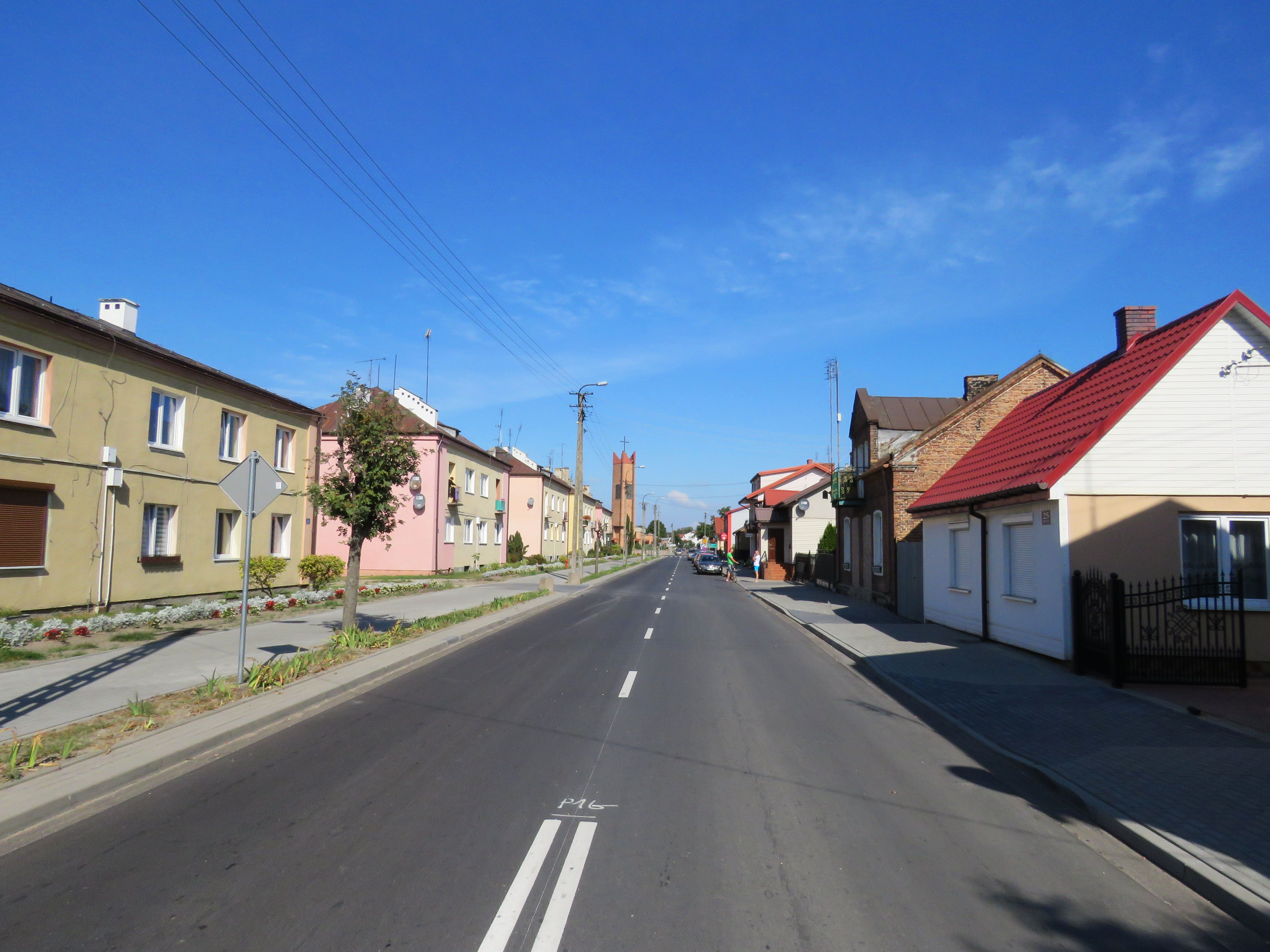
- Fabryczna Street with the Church of Christ the Redeemer in the background

- Coat of arms

- Location within Poland
- Coordinates: 52°49′N 20°17′E
- Country: Poland
- Voivodeship: Masovian
- County: Ciechanów
- Gmina: Glinojeck
- First mentioned: 1403
- Town rights: 1993

Government
  - Mayor: Łukasz Kapczyński

Area
  - Total: 7.37 km^{2} (2.85 sq mi)

Population (2006)
  - Total: 3,052
  - Density: 414/km^{2} (1,070/sq mi)
- Time zone: UTC+1 (CET)
  - Summer (DST): UTC+2 (CEST)
- Postal code: 06-450
- Area code: +48 23
- Car plates: WCI
- Website: http://www.glinojeck.net/

Glinojeck [ɡlʲiˈnɔjɛt͡sk] is a town in north-central Poland, in the Ciechanów County, in Masovian Voivodeship, with 3,052 inhabitants (2006).

== History ==
A sugar refinery was founded in Glinojeck in 1858.

Following the German-Soviet invasion of Poland, which started World War II in September 1939, it was occupied by Germany until 1945. Disabled people from Glinojeck were murdered by the Germans in a massacre carried out in February 1940 in the nearby village of Ościsłowo. A local Polish policeman was murdered by the Russians in the Katyn massacre in 1940.
