= Rumoka =

Rumoka may refer to:

- Volcan Rumoka, a volcano in the Democratic Republic of the Congo
- Rumoka, Ciechanów County, a village in Masovian Voivodeship (east-central Poland)
- Rumoka, Mława County, a village in Masovian Voivodeship (east-central Poland)
