= Brzeźnicka Węgorza =

River in Poland

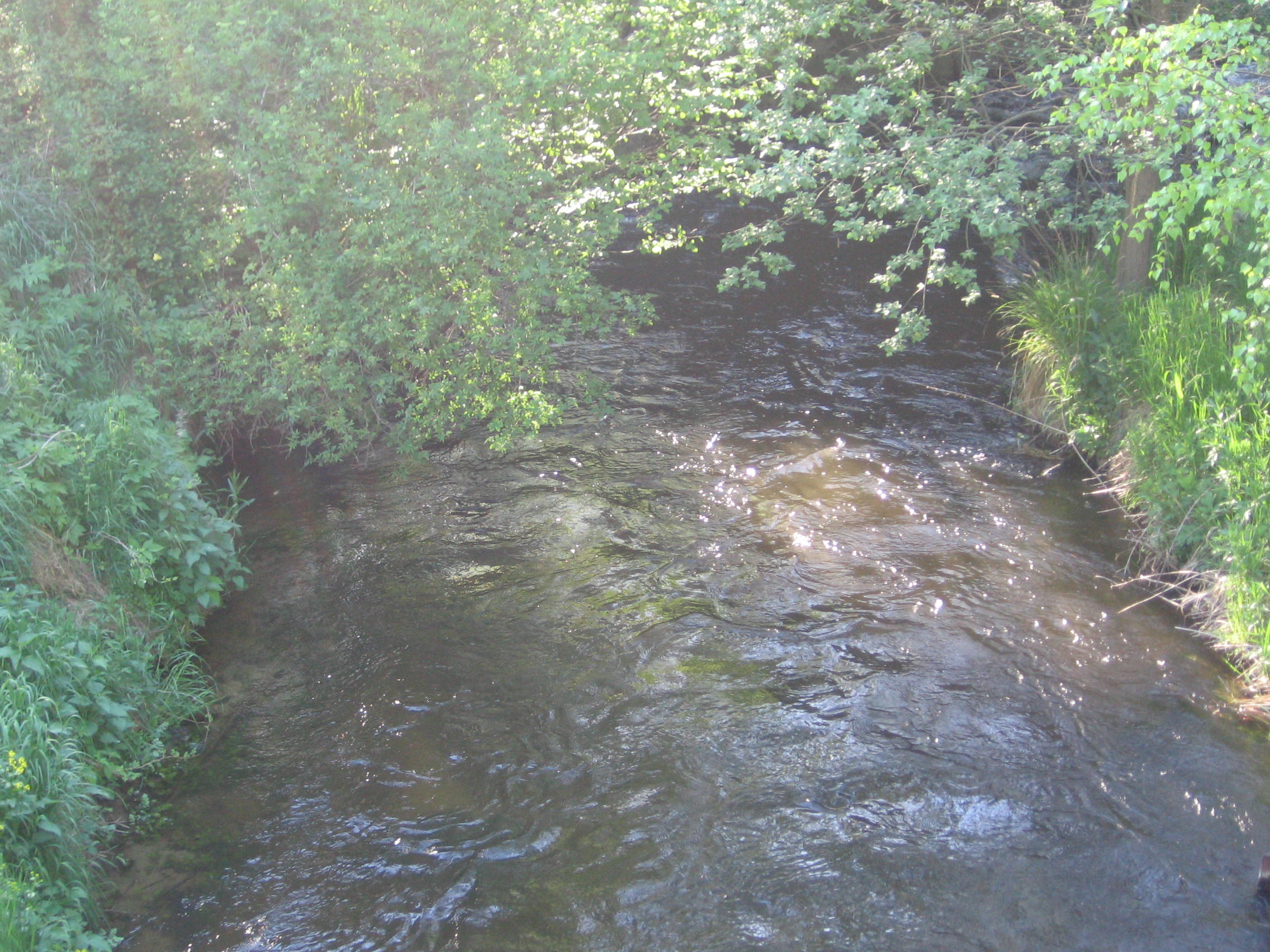

Location
- Country: Poland

Physical characteristics
- Source
  - location: Studnica lake (Drawa region)
- Mouth
  - location: Rega
  - coordinates: 53.6244°N 15.5839°E
- Length: 40 km (25 mi)

Basin features
- Progression: Rega→ Baltic Sea

Brzeźnicka Węgorza [bʐɛʑˈɲitska vɛŋˈɡɔʐa] is a river in gmina Węgorzyno, West Pomeranian Voivodeship, Poland. It is a tributary of Rega, being long for about 40 km. Its beginnings can be found in the Studnica lake, in Drawa river region. It flows into the Rega near Łobez.

Brzeźnicka Węgorza is extremely diverse along its current. In the upper current it resembles a mountain stream. The lower current (down the Żabice lake) is rather slow, the river flows in a wide valley, along riparian forests with ash trees and alders.
