= Kowalewko =

Kowalewko may refer to the following places:

- Kowalewko, Kuyavian-Pomeranian Voivodeship (north-central Poland)
- Kowalewko, Ciechanów County in Masovian Voivodeship (east-central Poland)
- Kowalewko, Mława County in Masovian Voivodeship (east-central Poland)
- Kowalewko, Płock County in Masovian Voivodeship (east-central Poland)
- Kowalewko, Gniezno County in Greater Poland Voivodeship (west-central Poland)
- Kowalewko, Oborniki County in Greater Poland Voivodeship (west-central Poland)
