= Juliszewo =

- Village
- Location within Poland
- Coordinates: 52°50′23″N 20°20′09″E
- Country: Poland
- Voivodeship: Masovian
- County: Ciechanów
- Gmina: Glinojeck

Juliszewo [juliˈʂɛvɔ] is a village in the administrative district of Gmina Glinojeck, within Ciechanów County, Masovian Voivodeship, in east-central Poland.
