= Bągart, Wąbrzeźno County =

Bągart
- Village
- Location within Poland
- Coordinates: 53°20′56″N 18°51′35″E
- Country: Poland
- Voivodeship: Kuyavian-Pomeranian
- County: Wąbrzeźno
- Gmina: Płużnica

Bągart [ˈbɔŋɡart] is a village in the administrative district of Gmina Płużnica, within Wąbrzeźno County, Kuyavian-Pomeranian Voivodeship, in north-central Poland.
