= Uciąż =

- Village
- Location within Poland
- Coordinates: 53°18′N 18°52′E
- Country: Poland
- Voivodeship: Kuyavian-Pomeranian
- County: Wąbrzeźno
- Gmina: Płużnica

Uciąż [ˈut͡ɕɔ̃ʂ] is a village in the administrative district of Gmina Płużnica, within Wąbrzeźno County, Kuyavian-Pomeranian Voivodeship, in north-central Poland.
