= Faustynowo, Masovian Voivodeship =

Faustynowo
- Village
- Location within Poland
- Coordinates: 52°48′N 20°21′E
- Country: Poland
- Voivodeship: Masovian
- County: Ciechanów
- Gmina: Glinojeck

Faustynowo [faustɨˈnɔvɔ] is a village in the administrative district of Gmina Glinojeck, within Ciechanów County, Masovian Voivodeship, in east-central Poland.
