= Ogonowo =

- Village
- Location within Poland
- Coordinates: 53°03′03″N 21°40′05″E
- Country: Poland
- Voivodeship: Masovian
- County: Ciechanów
- Gmina: Glinojeck

Ogonowo [ɔɡɔˈnɔvɔ] is a village in the administrative district of Gmina Glinojeck, within Ciechanów County, Masovian Voivodeship, in east-central Poland.
