= Płużnica =

- Village
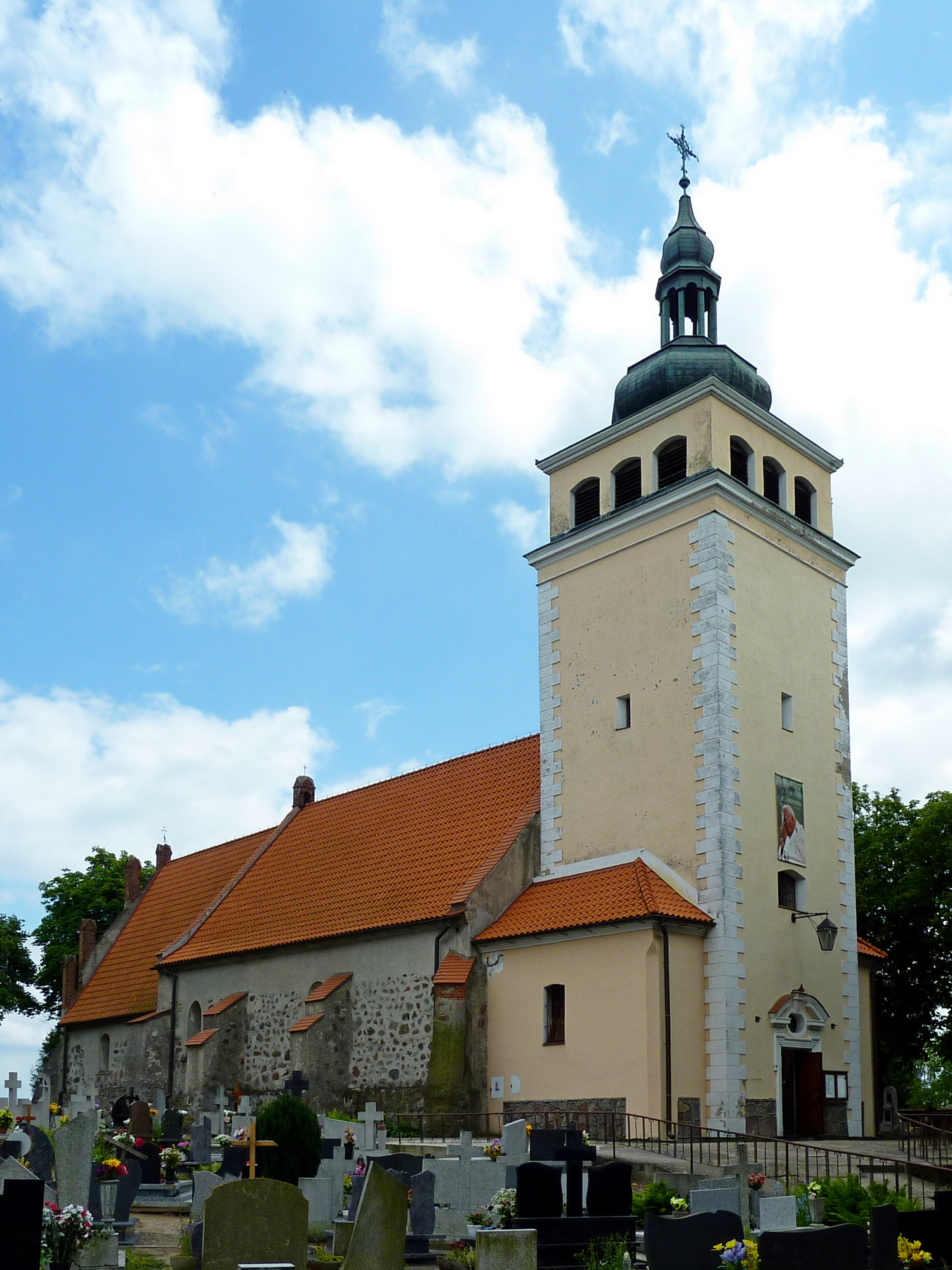
- Church of Saint Margaret

- Location within Poland
- Coordinates: 53°18′N 18°47′E
- Country: Poland
- Voivodeship: Kuyavian-Pomeranian
- County: Wąbrzeźno
- Gmina: Płużnica

Population
  - Total: 650
- Website: http://www.pluznica.pl

Płużnica [pwuʐˈnit͡sa] is a village in Wąbrzeźno County, Kuyavian-Pomeranian Voivodeship, in north-central Poland. It is the seat of the gmina (administrative district) called Gmina Płużnica.
