= Józefkowo, Wąbrzeźno County =

Józefkowo
- Village
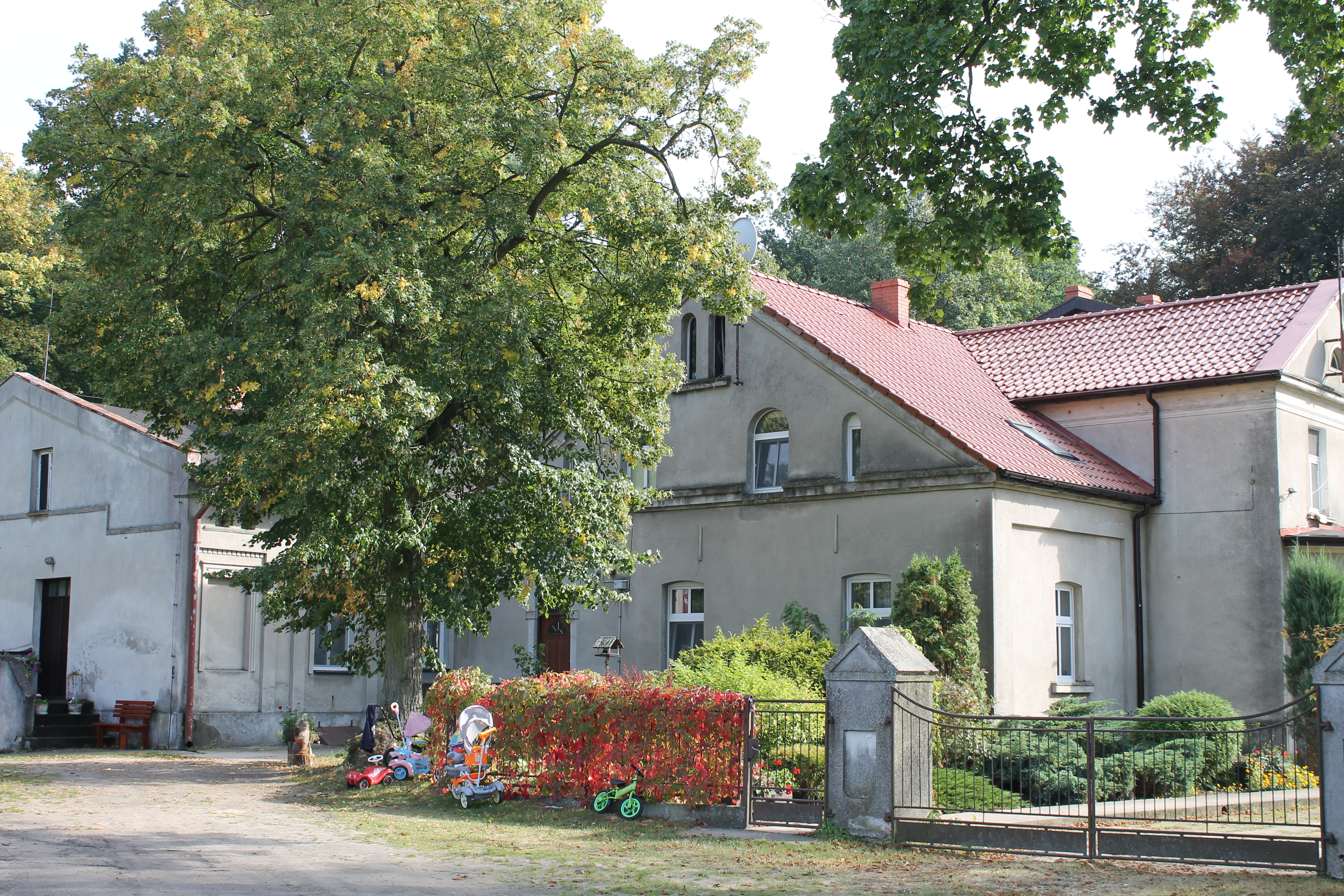

- Location within Poland
- Coordinates: 53°17′34″N 18°44′26″E
- Country: Poland
- Voivodeship: Kuyavian-Pomeranian
- County: Wąbrzeźno
- Gmina: Płużnica
- Time zone: UTC+1 (CET)
  - Summer (DST): UTC+2 (CEST)

Józefkowo [juzɛfˈkɔvɔ] is a village in the administrative district of Gmina Płużnica, within Wąbrzeźno County, Kuyavian-Pomeranian Voivodeship, in north-central Poland.

Five Polish citizens were murdered by Nazi Germany in the village during World War II.
