= Sadek, Ciechanów County =

Village in Masovian Voivodeship, Poland

Sadek
- Village
- Location within Poland
- Coordinates: 52°44′14″N 20°24′01″E
- Country: Poland
- Voivodeship: Masovian
- County: Ciechanów
- Gmina: Glinojeck
- Time zone: UTC+1 (CET)
  - Summer (DST): UTC+2 (CEST)
- Vehicle registration: WCI

Sadek [ˈsadɛk] is a village in the administrative district of Gmina Glinojeck, within Ciechanów County, Masovian Voivodeship, in north-central Poland.

Three Polish citizens were murdered by Nazi Germany in the village during World War II.
