= Działowo =

- Village
- Location within Poland
- Coordinates: 53°20′45″N 18°43′1″E
- Country: Poland
- Voivodeship: Kuyavian-Pomeranian
- County: Wąbrzeźno
- Gmina: Płużnica
- Population: 253

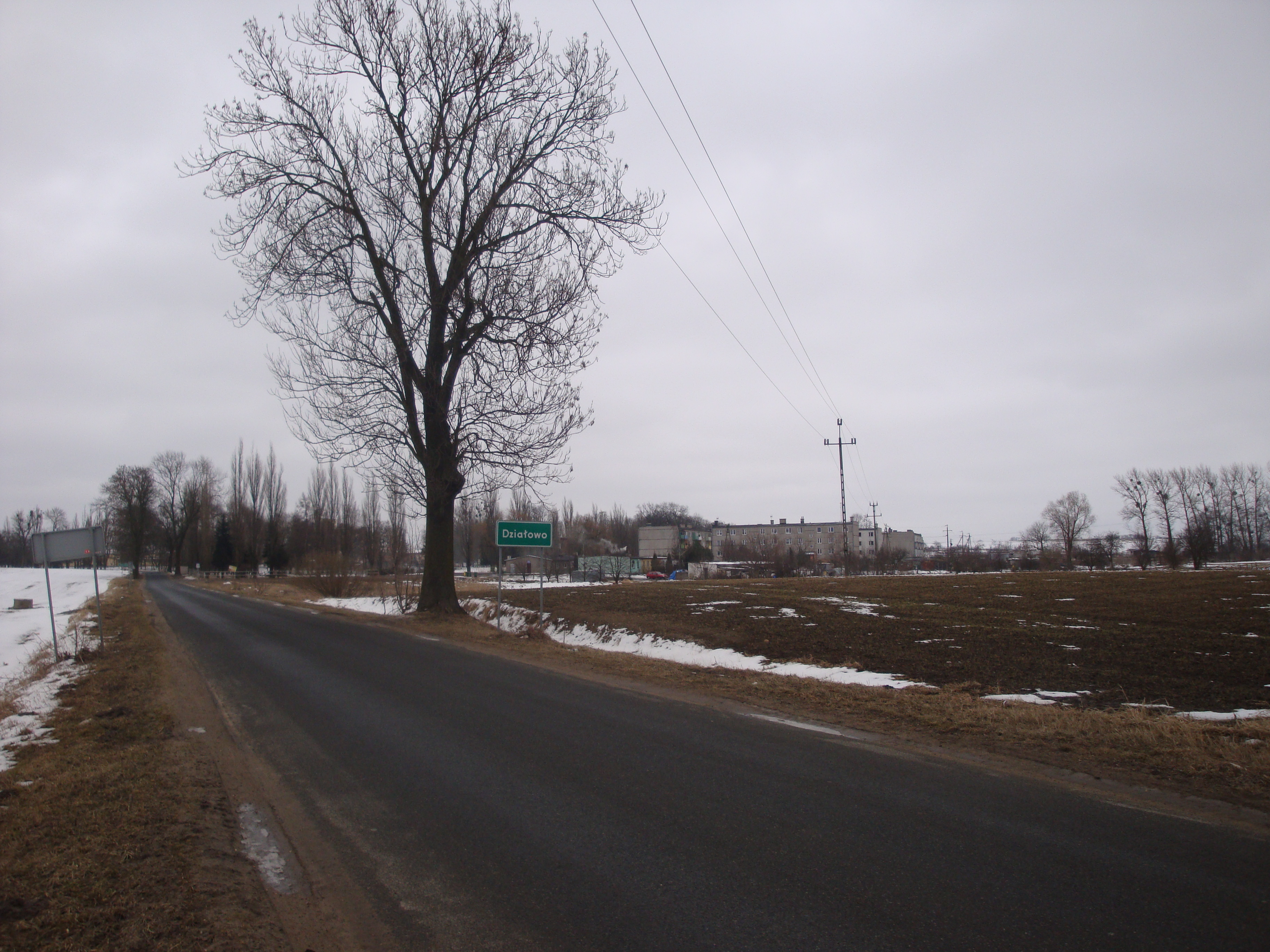

Działowo [d͡ʑaˈwɔvɔ] is a village in the administrative district of Gmina Płużnica, within Wąbrzeźno County, Kuyavian-Pomeranian Voivodeship, in north-central Poland.
