= Zalesie, Ciechanów County =

Zalesie
- Village
- Location within Poland
- Coordinates: 52°49′N 20°21′E
- Country: Poland
- Voivodeship: Masovian
- County: Ciechanów
- Gmina: Glinojeck
- Postal code: 06-450

Zalesie [zaˈlɛɕɛ] is a village in the administrative district of Gmina Glinojeck, within Ciechanów County, Masovian Voivodeship, in north-central Poland.
