= Goryń, Kuyavian-Pomeranian Voivodeship =

Goryń
- Village
- Location within Poland
- Coordinates: 53°21′6″N 18°47′46″E
- Country: Poland
- Voivodeship: Kuyavian-Pomeranian
- County: Wąbrzeźno
- Gmina: Płużnica

Goryń [ˈɡɔrɨɲ] is a village in the administrative district of Gmina Płużnica, within Wąbrzeźno County, Kuyavian-Pomeranian Voivodeship, in north-central Poland.
