= Huta, Ciechanów County =

Huta
- Village
- Location within Poland
- Coordinates: 52°49′49″N 20°22′27″E
- Country: Poland
- Voivodeship: Masovian
- County: Ciechanów
- Gmina: Glinojeck

Huta [ˈxuta] is a village in the administrative district of Gmina Glinojeck, within Ciechanów County, Masovian Voivodeship, in east-central Poland.
