= Gmina Płużnica =

Gmina Płużnica Płużnica Commune
- Gmina
- Coat of arms
- Interactive map of Gmina Płużnica
- Coordinates (Płużnica): 53°18′N 18°47′E
- Country: Poland
- Voivodeship: Kuyavian-Pomeranian
- County: Wąbrzeźno
- Seat: Płużnica

Area
  - Total: 119.33 km^{2} (46.07 sq mi)

Population (2006)
  - Total: 4,970
  - Density: 41.6/km^{2} (108/sq mi)
- Website: http://www.pluznica.pl

Gmina Płużnica is a rural gmina (administrative district) in Wąbrzeźno County, Kuyavian-Pomeranian Voivodeship, in north-central Poland. Its seat is the village of Płużnica, which lies approximately 12 kilometres (7 mi) west of Wąbrzeźno and 32 km (20 mi) north of Toruń.

The gmina covers an area of 119.33 square kilometres (46.1 sq mi), and as of 2006 its total population is 4,970.

== Villages ==
Gmina Płużnica contains the villages and settlements of Bągart, Bartoszewice, Bielawy, Błędowo, Czaple, Dąbrówka, Działowo, Goryń, Józefkowo, Kotnowo, Mgowo, Nowa Wieś Królewska, Orłowo, Ostrowo, Płąchawy, Płużnica, Pólko, Uciąż, Wieldządz and Wiewiórki.

== Neighbouring gminas ==
Gmina Płużnica is bordered by the gminas of Chełmno, Chełmża, Grudziądz, Lisewo, Radzyń Chełmiński, Stolno and Wąbrzeźno.
