= Lipiny, Ciechanów County =

Lipiny
- Village
- Location within Poland
- Coordinates: 52°48′24″N 20°24′49″E
- Country: Poland
- Voivodeship: Masovian
- County: Ciechanów
- Gmina: Glinojeck

Lipiny [liˈpinɨ] is a village in the administrative district of Gmina Glinojeck, within Ciechanów County, Masovian Voivodeship, in east-central Poland.
