= Pólko, Kuyavian-Pomeranian Voivodeship =

Pólko
- Village
- Location within Poland
- Coordinates: 53°19′36″N 18°52′24″E
- Country: Poland
- Voivodeship: Kuyavian-Pomeranian
- County: Wąbrzeźno
- Gmina: Płużnica

Pólko [ˈpulkɔ] is a village in the administrative district of Gmina Płużnica, within Wąbrzeźno County, Kuyavian-Pomeranian Voivodeship, in north-central Poland.
