= Szyjki Stare =

- Settlement
- Location within Poland
- Coordinates: 52°49′54″N 20°16′49″E
- Country: Poland
- Voivodeship: Masovian
- County: Ciechanów
- Gmina: Glinojeck

Szyjki Stare [ˈʂɨi̯ki ˈstarɛ] is a settlement in the administrative district of Gmina Glinojeck, within Ciechanów County, Masovian Voivodeship, in east-central Poland.
