= Czaple, Wąbrzeźno County =

Czaple
- Village
- Location within Poland
- Coordinates: 53°17′N 18°49′E
- Country: Poland
- Voivodeship: Kuyavian-Pomeranian
- County: Wąbrzeźno
- Gmina: Płużnica

Czaple [ˈt͡ʂaplɛ] is a village in the administrative district of Gmina Płużnica, within Wąbrzeźno County, Kuyavian-Pomeranian Voivodeship, in north-central Poland.
