= Gardominka =

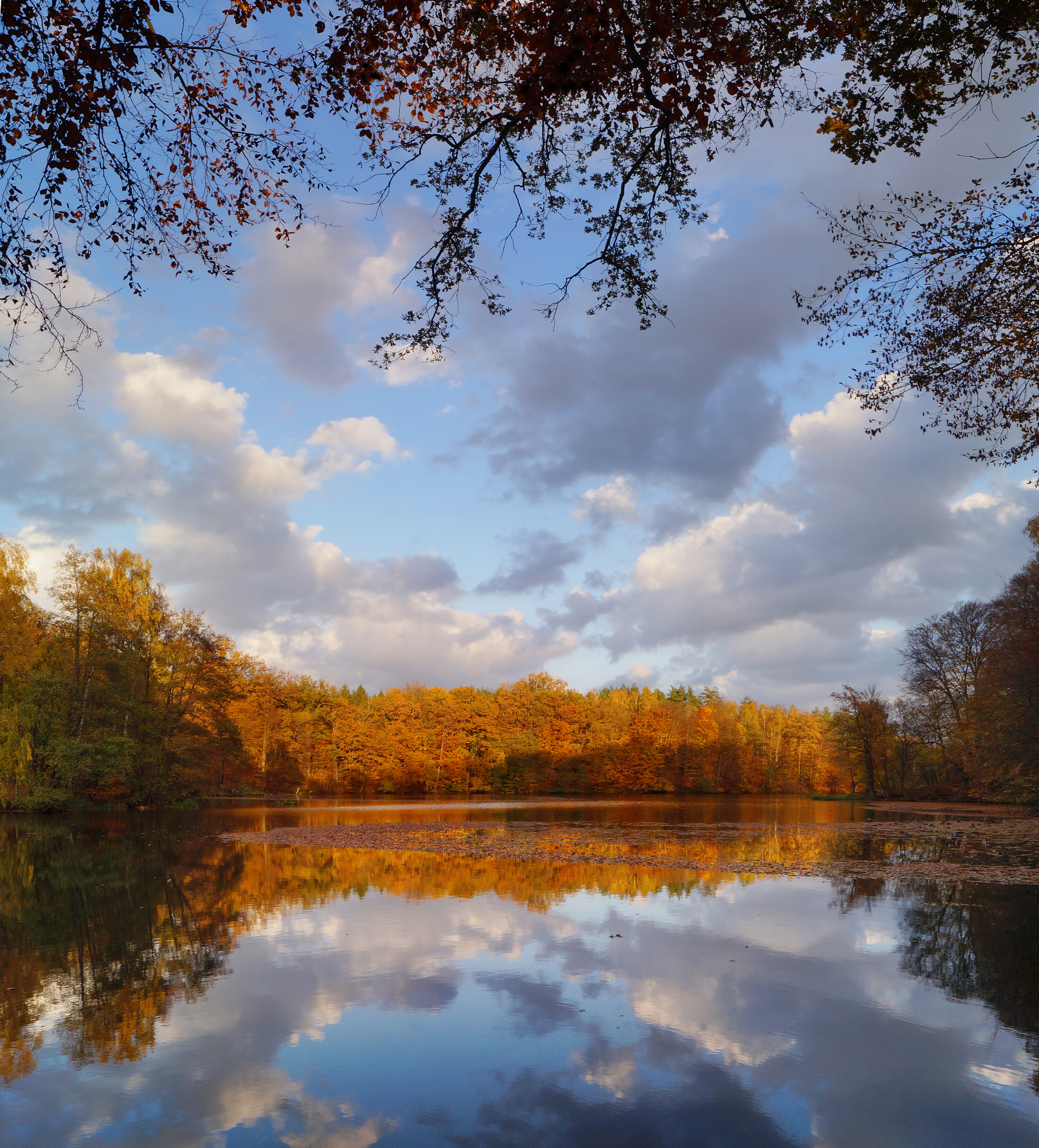

Location
- Country: Poland
- Voivodeship: West Pomeranian

Physical characteristics
- Source
  - location: north of Wojcieszyn, Goleniów County
  - coordinates: 53°41′57.0″N 15°09′03.0″E
- Mouth: Rega
  - location: east of Baszewice, Gryfice County
  - coordinates: 53.8586°N 15.2293°E
- Length: 26.6 km (16.5 mi)
- Basin size: 112.6 km^{2} (43.5 mi^{2})

Basin features
- Progression: Rega→ Baltic Sea

The Gardominka is a river in Poland which is a left-bank tributary of the Rega.
