= Stara Rega =

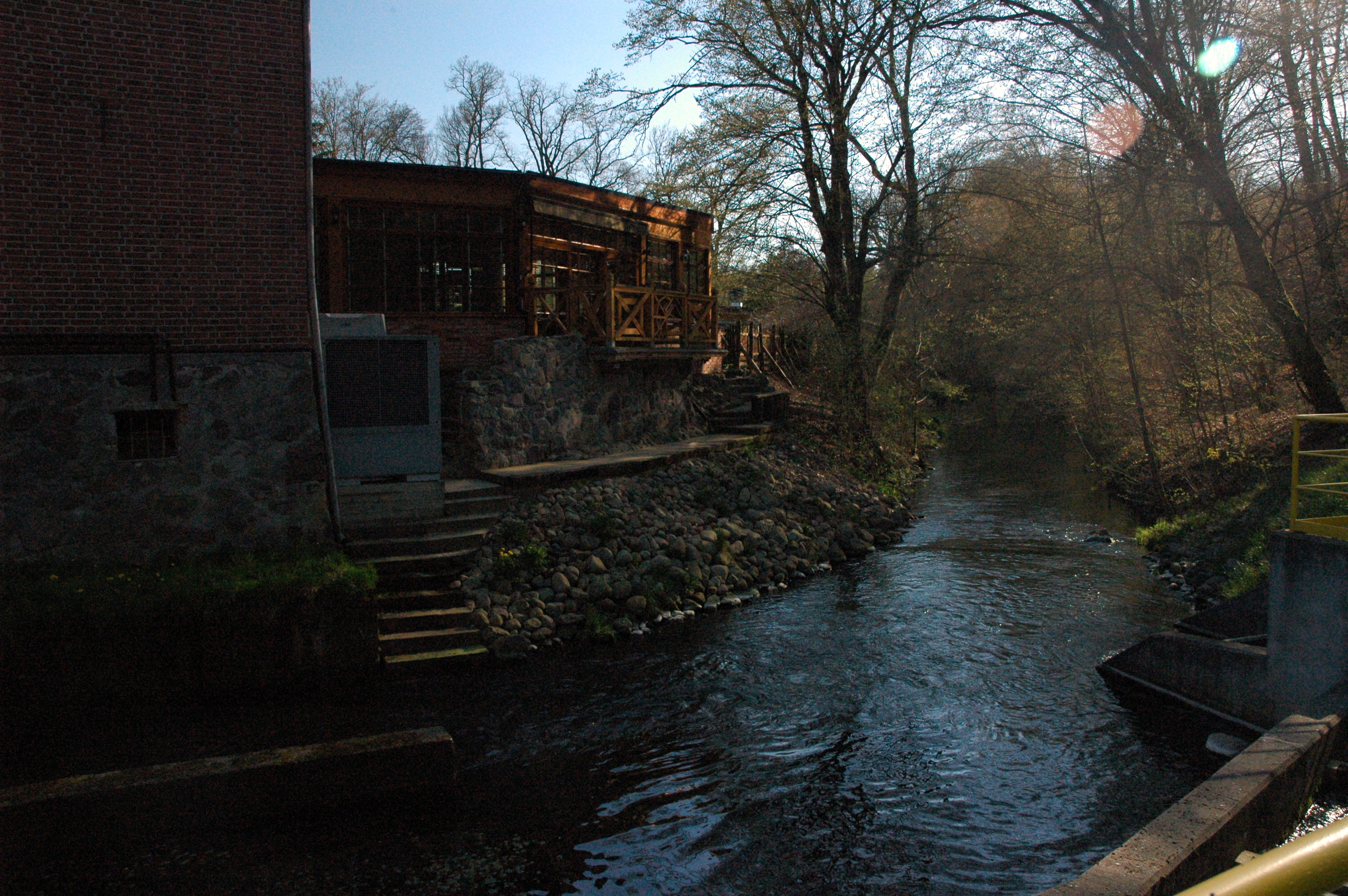

Location
- Country: Poland

Physical characteristics
- Mouth
  - location: Rega
  - coordinates: 53°42′51″N 15°40′21″E
- Length: 25 km

Basin features
- Progression: Rega→ Baltic Sea

Stara Rega is a river of Poland. It is a tributary of the Rega river near Słonowice. It is 25 km long.
