= Kondrajec Szlachecki =

- Village
- Location within Poland
- Coordinates: 52°47′36″N 20°15′36″E
- Country: Poland
- Voivodeship: Masovian
- County: Ciechanów
- Gmina: Glinojeck

Kondrajec Szlachecki (Polish pronunciation: [kɔnˈdrajɛts ʂlaˈxɛtskʲi]) is a village in the administrative district of Gmina Glinojeck, within Ciechanów County, Masovian Voivodeship, in east-central Poland.
