= Rekowa =

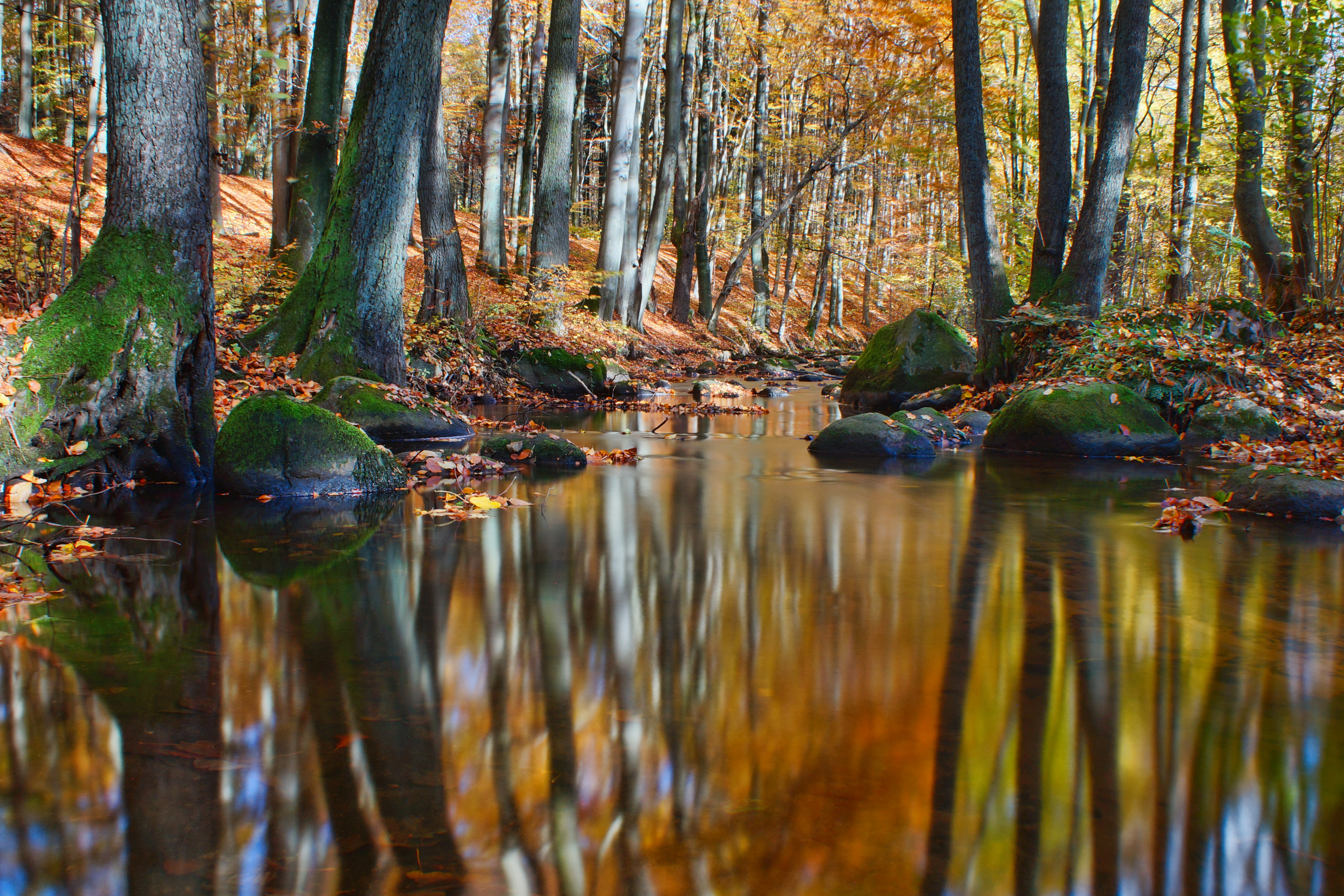

Location
- Country: Poland
- Voivodeship: West Pomeranian

Physical characteristics
- Source
  - location: west of Potuliny, Łobez County
  - coordinates: 53°47′35″N 15°29′21″E
- Mouth: Rega
  - location: northwest of Słudwia, Gryfice County
  - coordinates: 53°49′05″N 15°16′16″E
- Length: 22.01 km (13.68 mi)
- Basin size: 110.4 km^{2} (42.6 mi^{2})

Basin features
- Progression: Rega→ Baltic Sea

Rekowa is a river of Poland. It is a tributary of the Rega river near Płoty.
