= Pieńki Faustynowskie =

- Settlement
- Location within Poland
- Coordinates: 52°47′58″N 20°21′45″E
- Country: Poland
- Voivodeship: Masovian
- County: Ciechanów
- Gmina: Glinojeck

Pieńki Faustynowskie [ˈpjɛɲki fau̯stɨˈnɔfskʲɛ] is a settlement in the administrative district of Gmina Glinojeck, within Ciechanów County, Masovian Voivodeship, in east-central Poland.
