= Luszewo, Ciechanów County =

Luszewo
- Village
- Location within Poland
- Coordinates: 52°46′52″N 20°19′50″E
- Country: Poland
- Voivodeship: Masovian
- County: Ciechanów
- Gmina: Glinojeck
- Population: 145

Luszewo [luˈʂɛvɔ] is a village in the administrative district of Gmina Glinojeck, within Ciechanów County, Masovian Voivodeship, in east-central Poland.
