= Reska Węgorza =

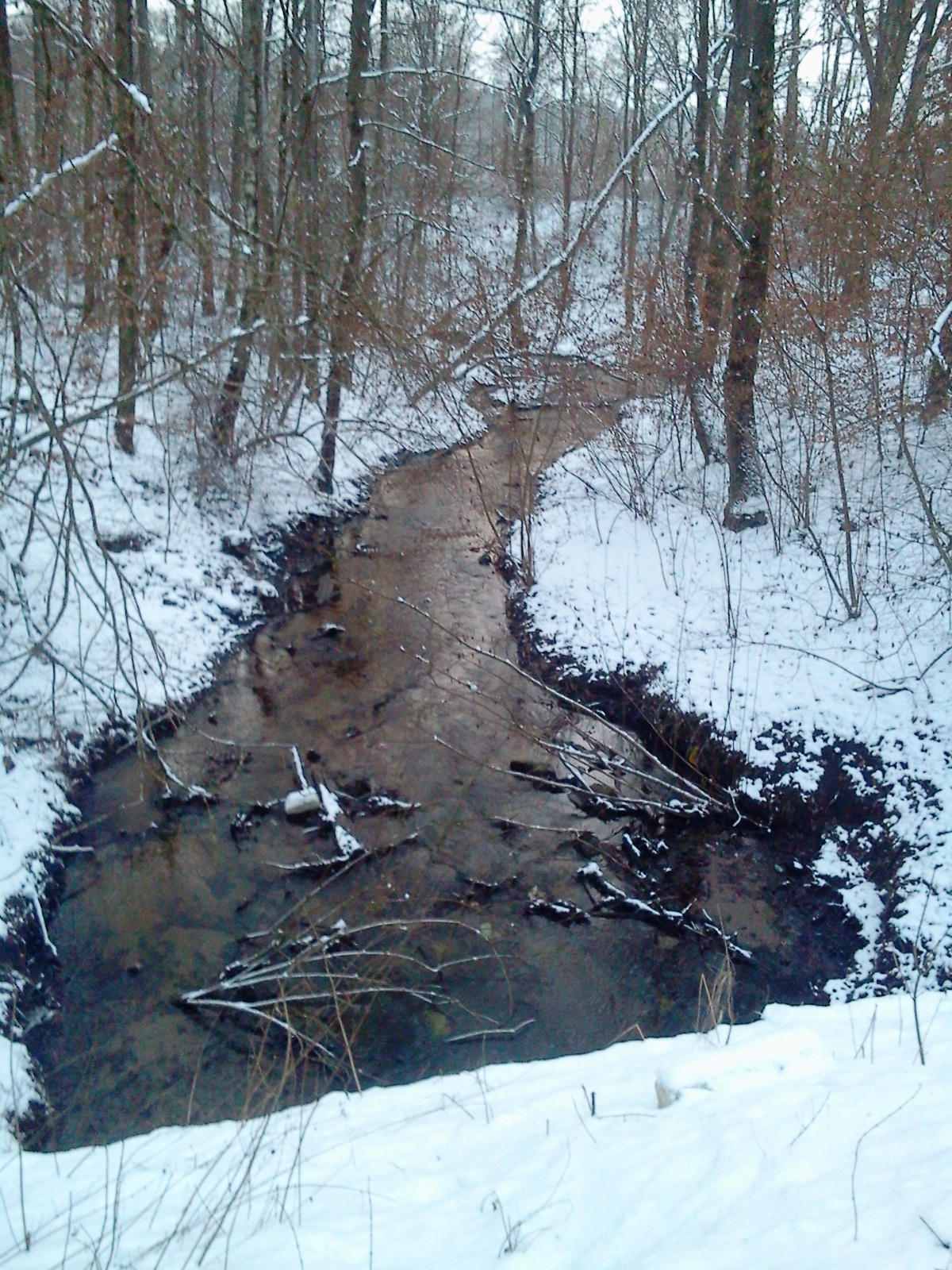

Location
- Country: Poland
- Voivodeship: West Pomeranian
- County (Powiat): Łobez

Physical characteristics
- Source
  - location: southeast of Cieszyno, Gmina Węgorzyno
  - coordinates: 53°30′27″N 15°28′17″E
- Mouth: Rega
  - location: southwest of Łobez, Gmina Łobez
  - coordinates: 53°37′25″N 15°34′59″E

Basin features
- Progression: Rega→ Baltic Sea

Reska Węgorza is a river of Poland. It is a tributary of the Rega river near Łobez.
