= Szyjki, Masovian Voivodeship =

Szyjki
- Village
- Location within Poland
- Coordinates: 52°50′52″N 20°17′13″E
- Country: Poland
- Voivodeship: Masovian
- County: Ciechanów
- Gmina: Glinojeck
- Population: 202

Szyjki [ˈʂɨi̯ki] is a village in the administrative district of Gmina Glinojeck, within Ciechanów County, Masovian Voivodeship, in east-central Poland.
