= Zawiłka =

- Village
- Location within Poland
- Coordinates: 52°43′42″N 20°23′17″E
- Country: Poland
- Voivodeship: Masovian
- County: Ciechanów
- Gmina: Glinojeck

Zawiłka [zaˈviu̯ka] is a village in the administrative district of Gmina Glinojeck, within Ciechanów County, Masovian Voivodeship, in east-central Poland.
