= Gałczyn =

- Town
- Location within Poland
- Coordinates: 52°47′24″N 20°13′58″E
- Country: Poland
- Voivodeship: Masovian
- County: Ciechanów
- Gmina: Glinojeck
- Population: 40

Gałczyn [ˈɡau̯t͡ʂɨn] is a village in the administrative district of Gmina Glinojeck, within Ciechanów County, Masovian Voivodeship, in east-central Poland.
