= Krusz =

- Village
- Location within Poland
- Coordinates: 52°50′4″N 20°21′59″E
- Country: Poland
- Voivodeship: Masovian
- County: Ciechanów
- Gmina: Glinojeck
- Population: 80

Krusz [kruʂ] is a village in the administrative district of Gmina Glinojeck, within Ciechanów County, Masovian Voivodeship, in east-central Poland.
