= Strzeszewo, Ciechanów County =

Strzeszewo
- Village
- Location within Poland
- Coordinates: 52°46′13″N 20°21′53″E
- Country: Poland
- Voivodeship: Masovian
- County: Ciechanów
- Gmina: Glinojeck

Strzeszewo [stʂɛˈʂɛvɔ] is a village in the administrative district of Gmina Glinojeck, within Ciechanów County, Masovian Voivodeship, in east-central Poland.
