= Malużyn =

- Village
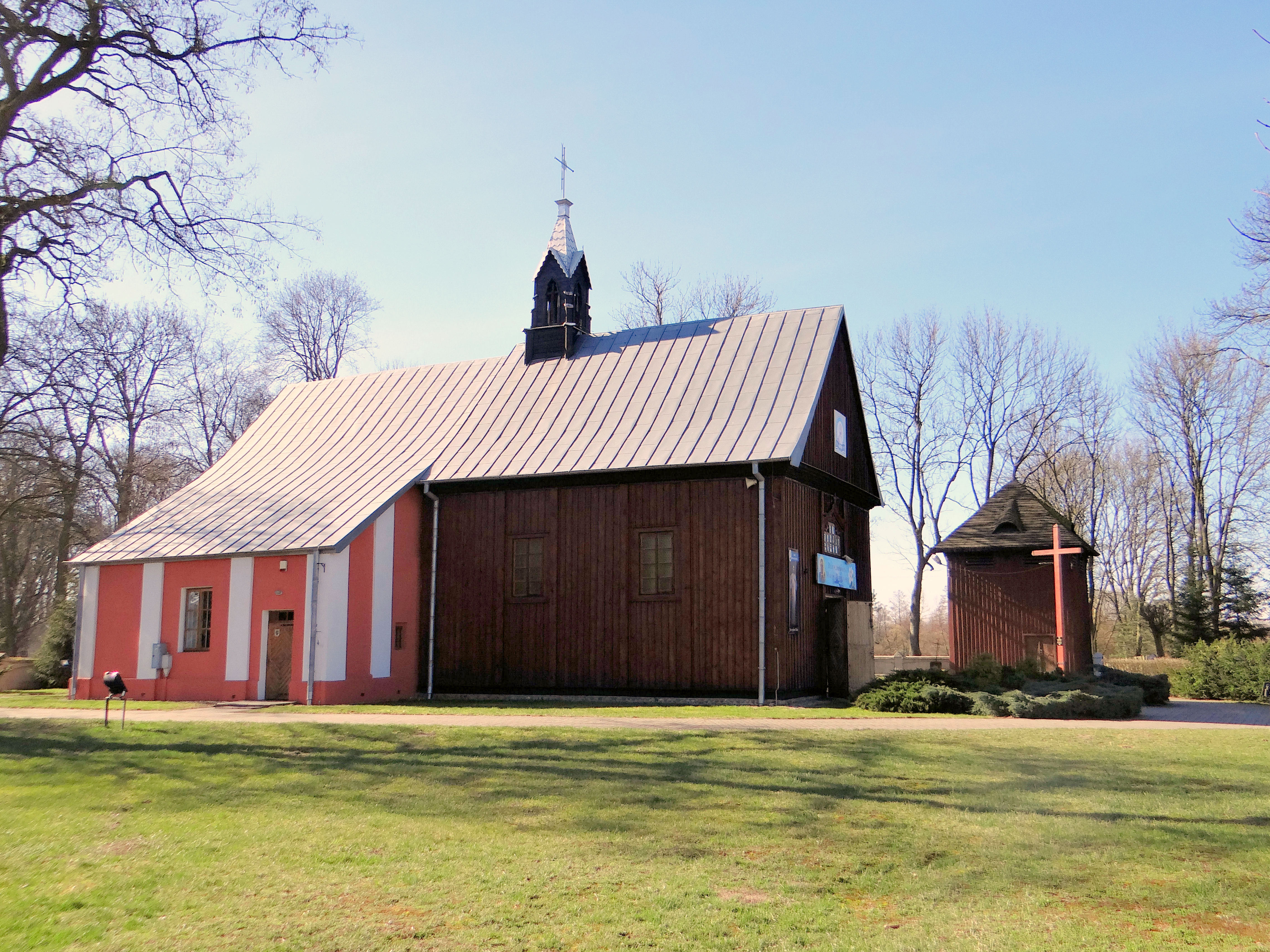
- Church of Saint Adalbert

- Location within Poland
- Coordinates: 52°45′N 20°25′E
- Country: Poland
- Voivodeship: Masovian
- County: Ciechanów
- Gmina: Glinojeck

Population
  - Total: 370

Malużyn [maˈluʐɨn] is a village in the administrative district of Gmina Glinojeck, within Ciechanów County, Masovian Voivodeship, in east-central Poland.
