= Orłowo, Wąbrzeźno County =

Orłowo
- Village
- Location within Poland
- Coordinates: 53°15′35″N 18°46′8″E
- Country: Poland
- Voivodeship: Kuyavian-Pomeranian
- County: Wąbrzeźno
- Gmina: Płużnica
- Population: 392

Orłowo [ɔrˈwɔvɔ] is a village in the administrative district of Gmina Płużnica, within Wąbrzeźno County, Kuyavian-Pomeranian Voivodeship, in north-central Poland.
