= Śródborze, Ciechanów County =

Śródborze
- Village
- Location within Poland
- Coordinates: 52°49′23″N 20°22′06″E
- Country: Poland
- Voivodeship: Masovian
- County: Ciechanów
- Gmina: Glinojeck
- Time zone: UTC+1 (CET)
  - Summer (DST): UTC+2 (CEST)

Śródborze [ɕrudˈbɔʐɛ] is a village in the administrative district of Gmina Glinojeck, within Ciechanów County, Masovian Voivodeship, in north-central Poland.
