= Ukleja (river) =

Location
- Country: Poland
- Voivodeship: West Pomeranian

Physical characteristics
- Source: Dłusko Lake
  - location: south of Dłusko, Łobez County
  - coordinates: 53°29′24″N 15°29′15″E
- Mouth: Rega
  - location: southern shore of Lake Lisowskie, Gryfice County
  - coordinates: 53°45′11″N 15°16′15″E
- Length: 48 km (30 mi)
- Basin size: 453 km^{2} (175 sq mi)

Basin features
- Progression: Rega→ Baltic Sea

Ukleja is a river of Poland. It is a left-bank tributary of the Rega River, originating from Lake Dłusko. On its path it flows through Lakes Woświn, Mielno, and Okrzeja, connecting them. After that it transitions into a gravel-bed lowland stream and then into a sandy-clay lowland river before it meets the Rega. Just before it does so, the Sąpólna River, its largest tributary, joins it on its left bank.

The most abundant fish species along the river are gudgeon (Gobio gobio L.), brown trout (Salmo trutta fario L.), bullhead (Cottus gobio L.), and spined loach (Cobitis taenia L.).

A 2008 WIOŚ assessment rated its water quality as good.

== Gallery ==
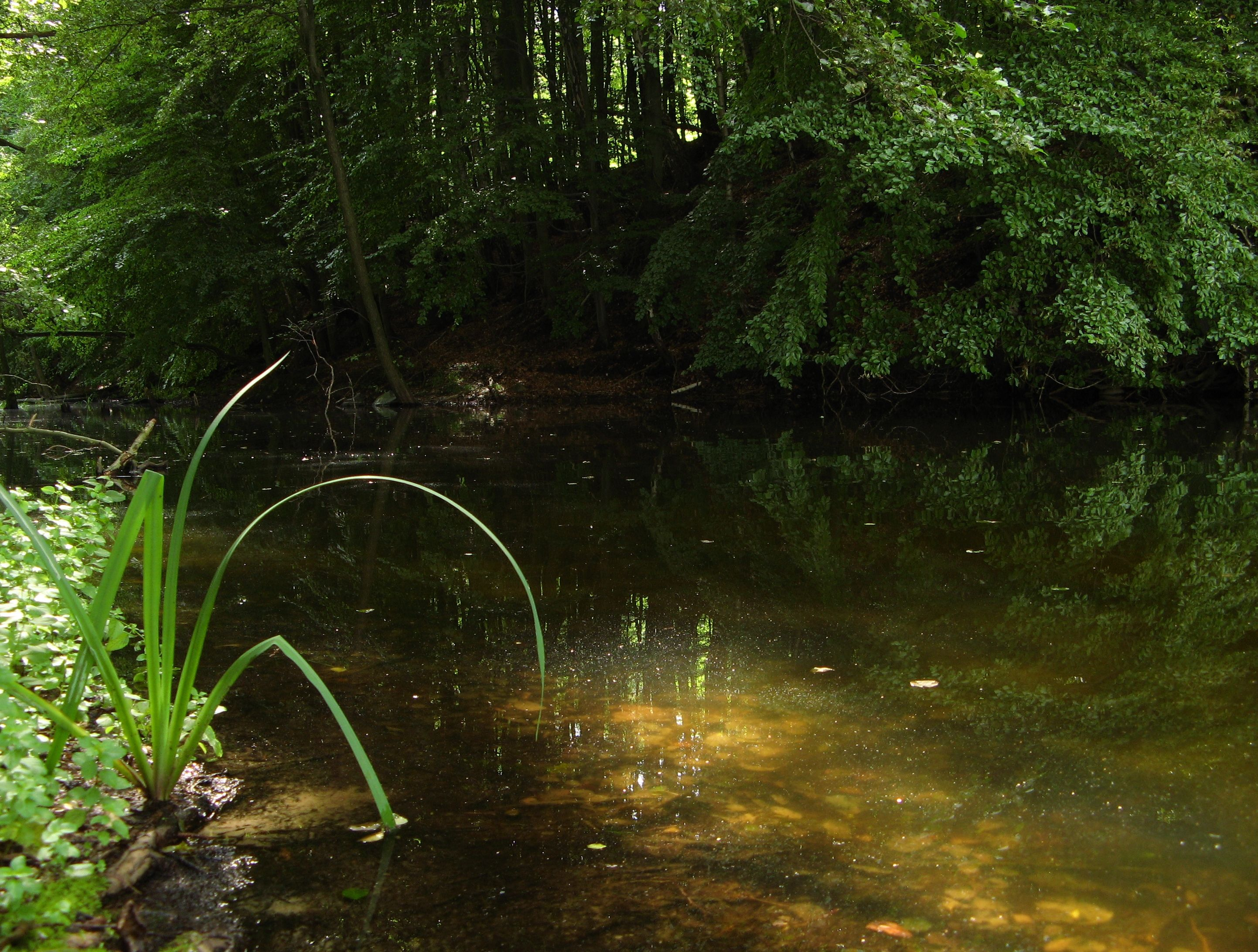
Lake Dłusko, the source of the Ukleja

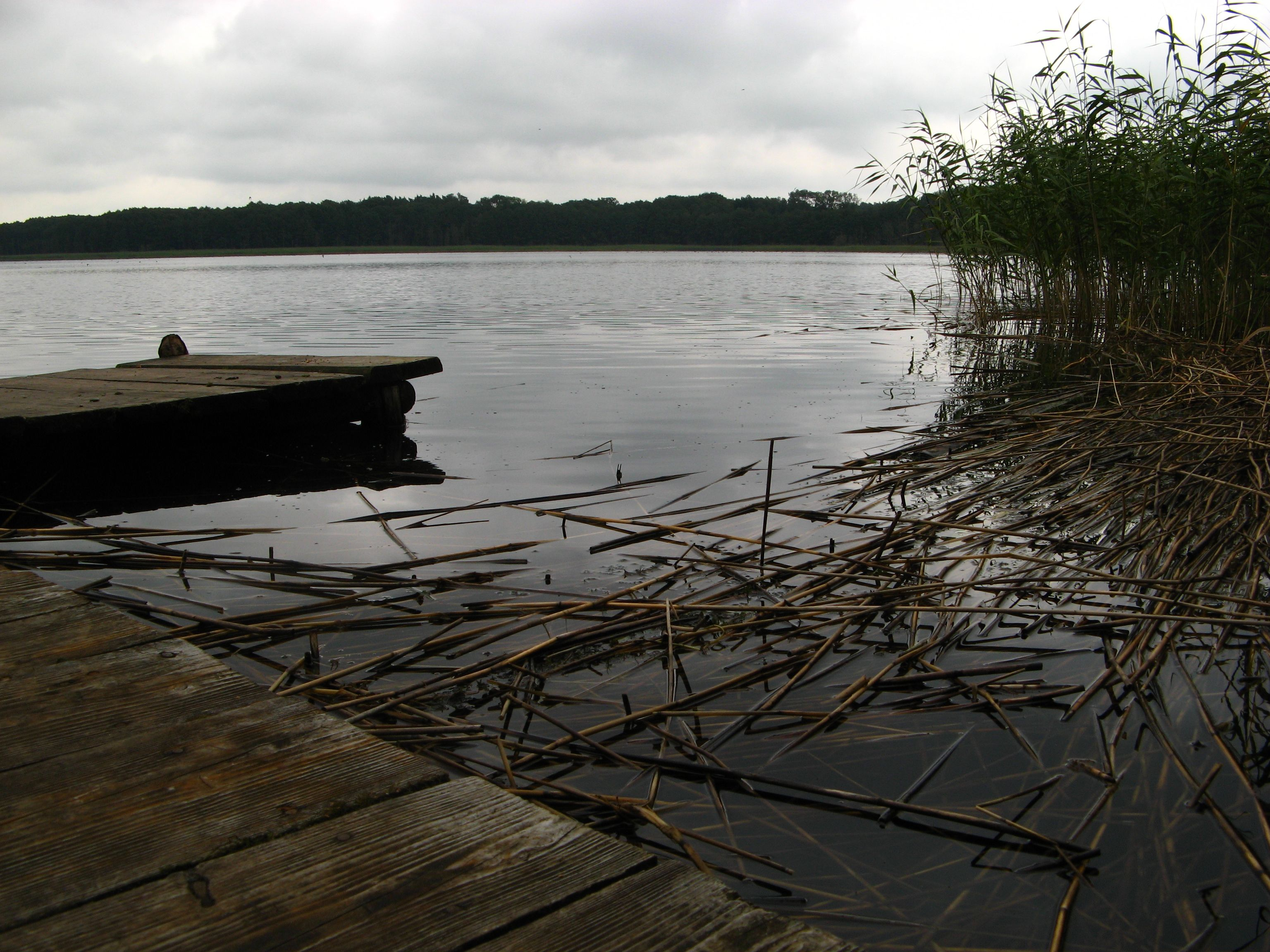
Lake Woświn

== See also ==
- Sąpólna
