= Kondrajec Pański =

- Village
- Location within Poland
- Coordinates: 52°47′N 20°13′E
- Country: Poland
- Voivodeship: Masovian
- County: Ciechanów
- Gmina: Glinojeck
- Population (approx.): 460

Kondrajec Pański (Polish pronunciation: [kɔnˈdrajɛts ˈpaj̃skʲi]) is a village in the administrative district of Gmina Glinojeck, within Ciechanów County, Masovian Voivodeship, in east-central Poland.
