= Błędowo, Wąbrzeźno County =

Błędowo
- Village
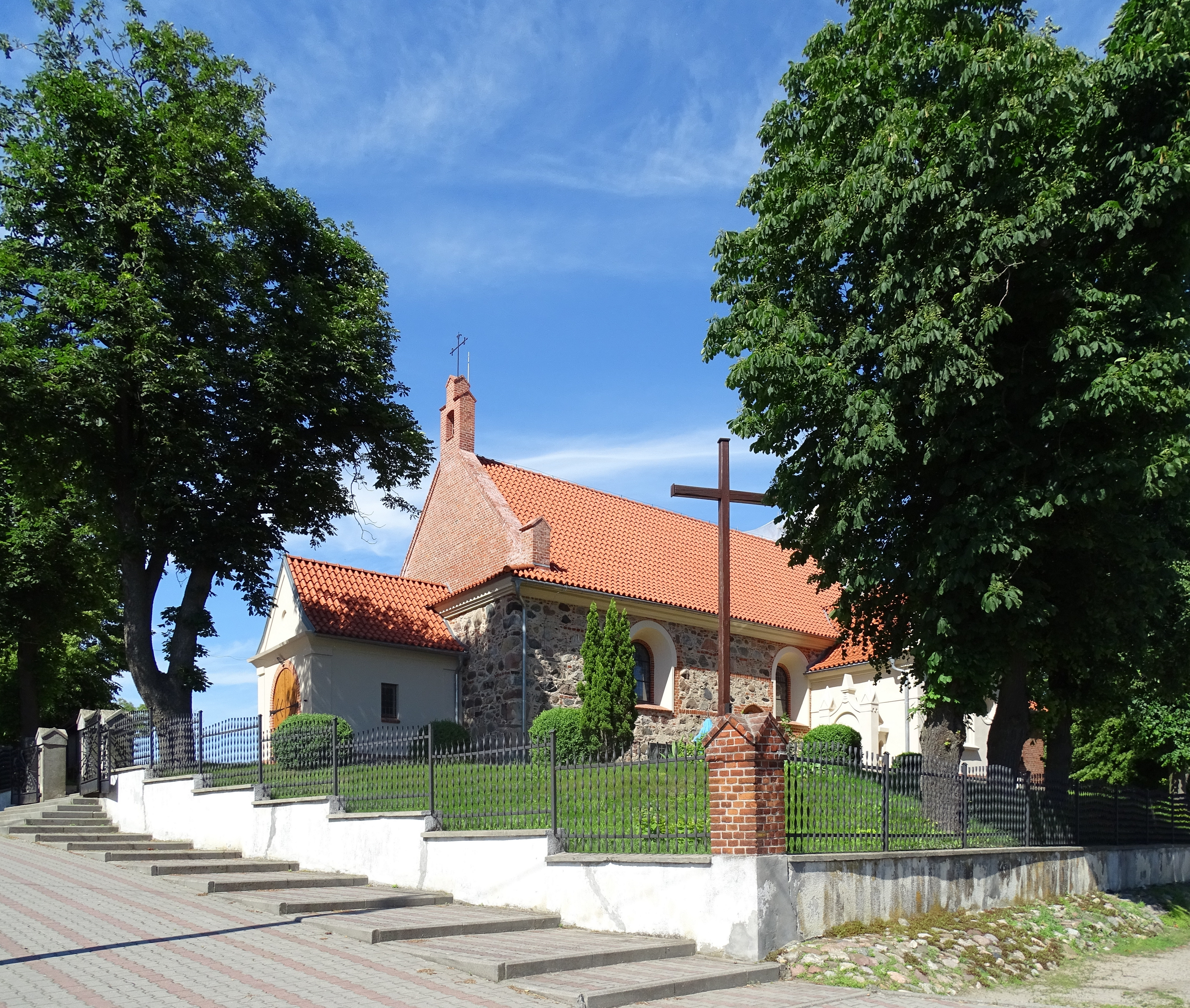

- Location within Poland
- Coordinates: 53°21′N 18°46′E
- Country: Poland
- Voivodeship: Kuyavian-Pomeranian
- County: Wąbrzeźno
- Gmina: Płużnica

Błędowo [bwɛnˈdɔvɔ] is a village in the administrative district of Gmina Płużnica, within Wąbrzeźno County, Kuyavian-Pomeranian Voivodeship, in north-central Poland.
