= Gmina Glinojeck =

Gmina Glinojeck Glinojeck Commune
- Gmina
- Coat of arms
- Interactive map of Gmina Glinojeck
- Coordinates (Glinojeck): 52°49′N 20°17′E
- Country: Poland
- Voivodeship: Masovian
- County: Ciechanów
- Seat: Glinojeck

Area
  - Total: 153.49 km^{2} (59.26 sq mi)

Population (2013)
  - Total: 8,166
  - Density: 53.20/km^{2} (137.8/sq mi)
  - Urban: 3,150
  - Rural: 5,016
- Website: http://www.glinojeck.pl

Gmina Glinojeck is an urban-rural gmina (administrative district) in Ciechanów County, Masovian Voivodeship, in east-central Poland. Its seat is the town of Glinojeck, which lies approximately 25 kilometres (16 mi) west of Ciechanów and 83 km (52 mi) north-west of Warsaw.

The gmina covers an area of 153.49 square kilometres (59.3 sq mi), and as of 2006 its total population is 7,937 (out of which the population of Glinojeck amounts to 3,052, and the population of the rural part of the gmina is 4,885).

== Villages ==
Apart from the town of Glinojeck, Gmina Glinojeck contains the villages and settlements of Bielawy, Brody Młockie, Budy Rumockie, Dreglin, Dukt, Działy, Faustynowo, Gałczyn, Huta, Janowo, Juliszewo, Kamionka, Kondrajec Pański, Kondrajec Szlachecki, Kowalewko, Krusz, Lipiny, Luszewo, Malużyn, Nowy Garwarz, Ogonowo, Ościsłowo, Pieńki Faustynowskie, Płaciszewo, Rumoka, Sadek, Śródborze, Stary Garwarz, Strzeszewo, Sulerzyż, Szyjki, Szyjki Stare, Wkra, Wkra-Kolonia, Wola Młocka, Wólka Garwarska, Zalesie, Zawiłka, Żeleźnia and Zygmuntowo.

== Neighbouring gminas ==
Gmina Glinojeck is bordered by the gminas of Baboszewo, Ciechanów, Ojrzeń, Raciąż, Sochocin and Strzegowo.
