= Wkra, Masovian Voivodeship =

Wkra
- Village
- Location within Poland
- Coordinates: 52°48′N 20°18′E
- Country: Poland
- Voivodeship: Masovian
- County: Ciechanów
- Gmina: Glinojeck

Wkra [fkra] is a village in the administrative district of Gmina Glinojeck, within Ciechanów County, Masovian Voivodeship, in east-central Poland.
