= Bartoszewice, Kuyavian-Pomeranian Voivodeship =

Bartoszewice
- Village
- Location within Poland
- Coordinates: 53°16′58″N 18°48′29″E
- Country: Poland
- Voivodeship: Kuyavian-Pomeranian
- County: Wąbrzeźno
- Gmina: Płużnica
- Population: 190

Bartoszewice [bartɔʂɛˈvit͡sɛ] is a village in the administrative district of Gmina Płużnica, within Wąbrzeźno County, Kuyavian-Pomeranian Voivodeship, in north-central Poland.
