= Wiewiórki, Kuyavian-Pomeranian Voivodeship =

Wiewiórki
- Village
- Location within Poland
- Coordinates: 53°22′N 18°49′E
- Country: Poland
- Voivodeship: Kuyavian-Pomeranian
- County: Wąbrzeźno
- Gmina: Płużnica
- Population: 390

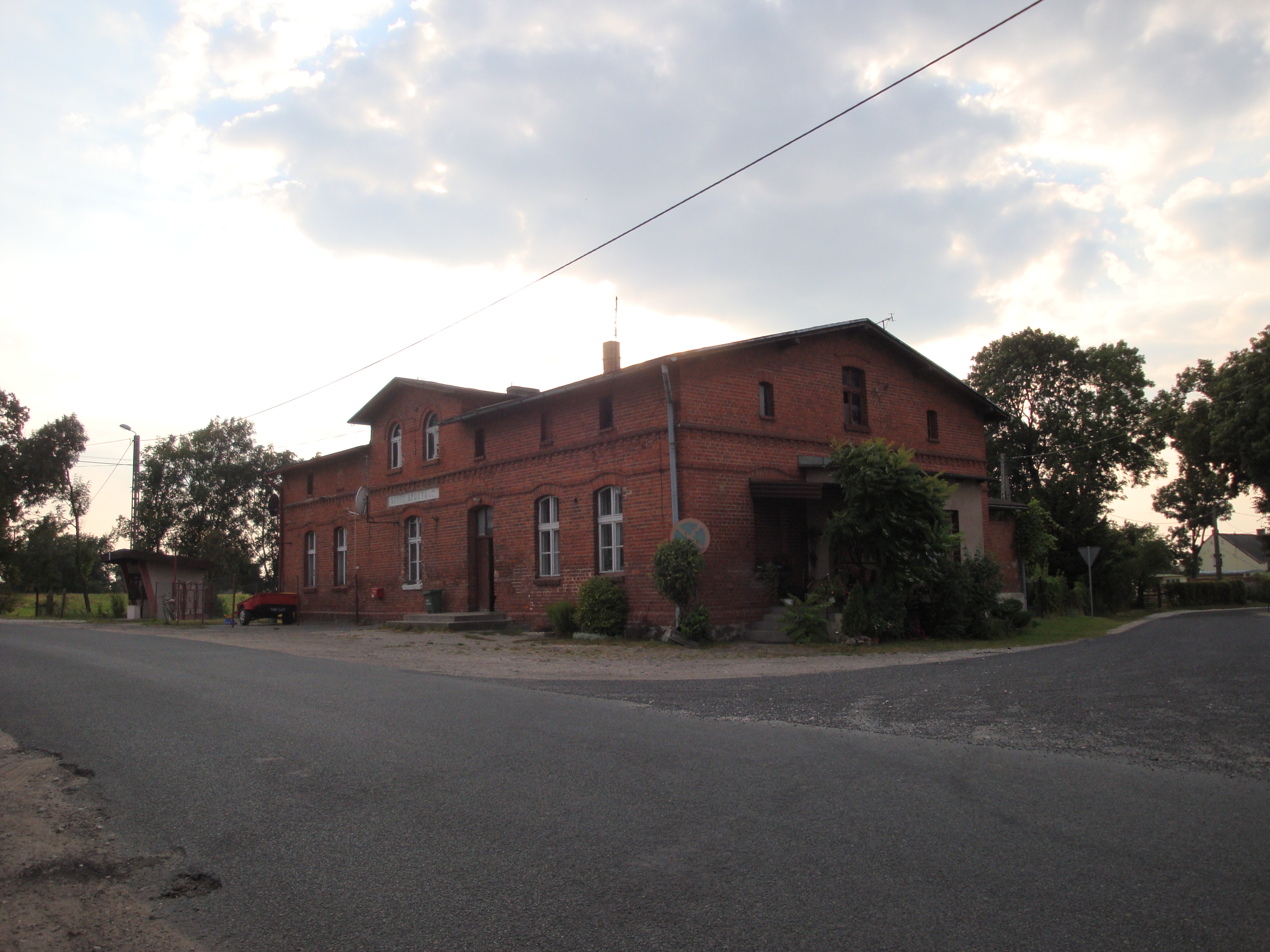
Local shop in Wiewiórki, previously inn

Wiewiórki [vjɛˈvjurki] is a village in the administrative district of Gmina Płużnica, within Wąbrzeźno County, Kuyavian-Pomeranian Voivodeship, in north-central Poland.
