= Ościsłowo, Masovian Voivodeship =

Ościsłowo
- Village
- Location within Poland
- Coordinates: 52°50′5″N 20°27′0″E
- Country: Poland
- Voivodeship: Masovian
- County: Ciechanów
- Gmina: Glinojeck
- Time zone: UTC+1 (CET)
  - Summer (DST): UTC+2 (CEST)
- Vehicle registration: WCI

Ościsłowo [ɔɕt͡ɕiˈswɔvɔ] is a village in the administrative district of Gmina Glinojeck, within Ciechanów County, Masovian Voivodeship, in north-central Poland.

== History ==
According to the 1921 census, the village had a population of 345, entirely Polish by nationality and Roman Catholic by confession.

During the German occupation of Poland (World War II), Ościsłowo was the site of large massacres, in which several hundred Poles were murdered as part of the Intelligenzaktion. Also several dozen people with physical and mental disabilities from the region were murdered in the village on 20 February 1940.

== Notable people ==
- Bogusław Zakrzewski (born 1935), Polish diplomat
- Teresa Kostkiewiczowa (born 1936), Polish literary scholar, professor, university teacher
