= Mick Ukleja =

American author, consultant and philanthropist

- Born: April 28, 1948 (age 78); San Bernardino, California, U.S.
- Education: Dallas Theological Seminary
- Occupations: Author, Consultant
- Spouse: Louise Ukleja
- Website: Official website

Mick Ukleja (born April 28, 1948) is an American author, consultant and philanthropist.

Ukleja is the president and CEO of LeadershipTraQ, a leadership and management consultancy based out of Los Alamitos, California. He is founder of the Ukleja Center for Ethical Leadership at the College of Business Administration at California State University, Long Beach, where he also serves on the Governing Council. Ukleja was honored by CSULB in 2006 as a Distinguished Alumnus by the College of Liberal Arts, and also in 2002 when he received the President's Distinguished Service Award from former president Robert Maxson.

Ukleja is a former director and current chair of the board of trustees for the Astronauts Memorial Foundation at NASA. He also sits on the National Executive Board for The Ken Blanchard Leadership Center, as well as the Board of Governors at CSULB.

== Biography ==
Ukleja was born in San Bernardino, California. He received his B.A. degree in Philosophy at California State University Long Beach, a Masters in Semitic languages and a Ph.D. in theology from Dallas Theological Seminary. Before starting LeadershipTraQ, he was pastor at Grace Church in Cypress, California for 20 years.

== In the media ==
Ukleja has made appearances on NBC and FOX News, as well as radio interviews with Dennis Prager and Hugh Hewitt.

== Books ==
- Managing the Millennials: Discover the Core Competencies for Managing Today's Workforce, coauthors Chip Espinoza, Craig Rusch (Wiley, 2010, ISBN 978-0-470-56393-9)
- The Ethics Challenge (Morgan James, 2009, ISBN 978-1-60037-609-2)
- Who Are You? What Do You Want?: Four Questions That Will Change Your Life (Penguin Group, 2009, ISBN 978-0-399-53543-7)
- Who Are You and What Do You Want: A Journey for the Best of Your Life (Meredith Books, 2008, ISBN 978-0-696-23892-5)
