= Studnica (lake) =

Lake in West Pomeranian Voivodeship, Poland

Studnica lake
- Location within West Pomeranian Voivodeship
- Location: Gwda Valley District
- Coordinates: 53°27′12″N 15°39′20″E
- Basin countries: Poland
- Max. length: 2.2 km (1.4 mi)
- Max. width: 0.8 km (0.50 mi)
- Surface area: 1.02 ha (2.5 acres)
- Max. depth: 24.9 m (82 ft)
- Surface elevation: 139 m (456 ft)
- Islands: none

Studnica lake (Polish: jezioro Studnica, pronounced [jɛˈʑɔrɔ studˈɲit͡sa]) is a lake located in the Gwda Valley District, in the north-west part of Poland. It is 24.9 m (82 ft) deep, 2.2 km (1.4 mi) long and 0.8 km (0.50 mi) wide. Studnica lake is also the source of Gwda river.

There are four different Studnica lakes in Poland.

== See also ==
- Studnica (Drawsko Pomorskie), Drawsko County
- Studnica (Wierzchowo), Drawsko County
- Studnica (Rymań), Kołobrzeg County
- Studnica (Szczecinek), Szczecinek County
