= Bielawa, Wrocław County =

Bielany
- Village
- Location within Poland
- Coordinates: 51°56′N 23°7′E
- Country: Poland
- Voivodeship: Lublin
- County: Biała
- Gmina: Łomazy

Bielany [bʲɛˈlanɨ] is a village in the administrative district of Gmina Łomazy, within Biała County, Lublin Voivodeship, in eastern Poland.
