= Dłusko, Łobez County =

Dłusko
- Village
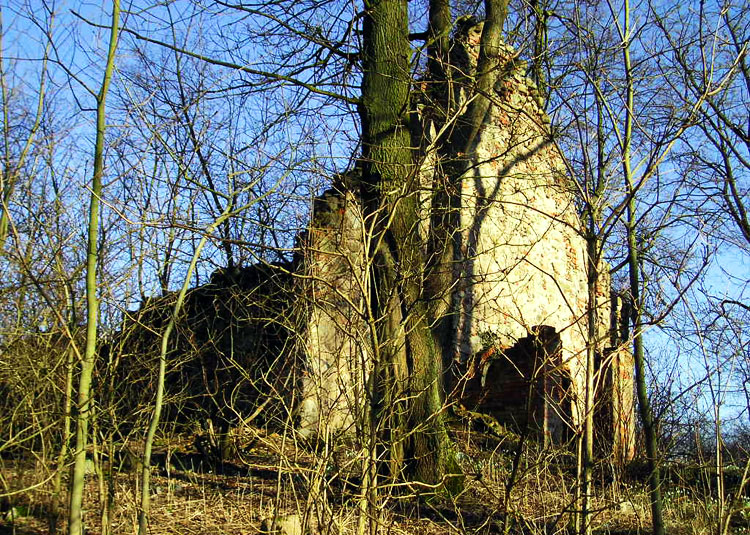
- Old church ruins in Dłusko

- Location within Poland
- Coordinates: 53°29′39″N 15°29′19″E
- Country: Poland
- Voivodeship: West Pomeranian
- County: Łobez
- Gmina: Węgorzyno
- Time zone: UTC+1 (CET)
  - Summer (DST): UTC+2 (CEST)
- Vehicle registration: ZLO

Dłusko [ˈdwuskɔ] is a village in the administrative district of Gmina Węgorzyno, within Łobez County, West Pomeranian Voivodeship, in north-western Poland. It is situated on the northern shore of Dłusko Lake.

== History ==
During World War II, on 3 February 1945, the village was the site of a stopover during the German-organised march of some 6,000 Polish prisoners of war from the Oflag II-D camp headed westwards.
