= Zygmuntowo, Gmina Glinojeck =

Zygmuntowo
- Village
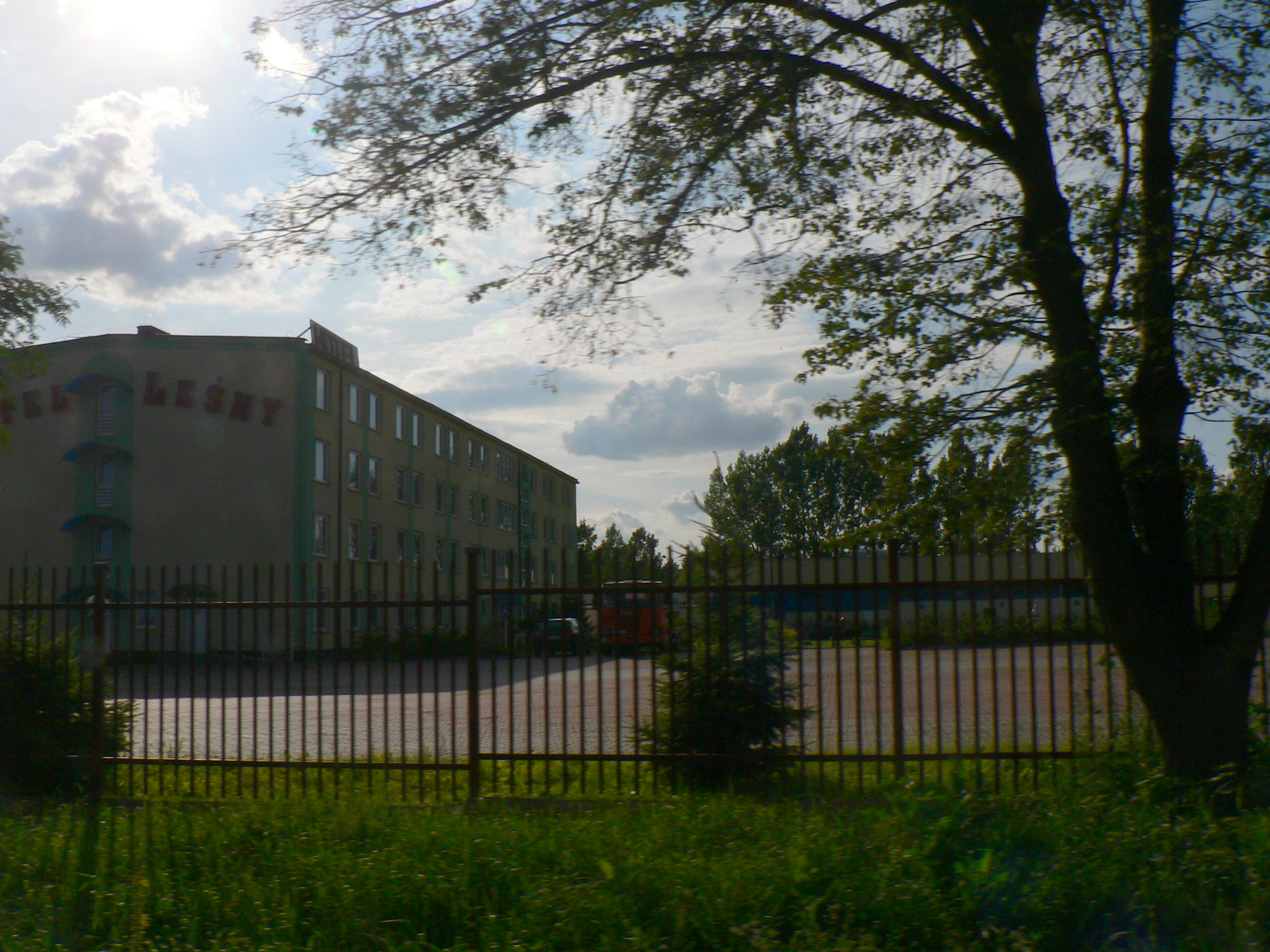

- Location within Poland
- Coordinates: 52°50′10″N 20°15′11″E
- Country: Poland
- Voivodeship: Masovian
- County: Ciechanów
- Gmina: Glinojeck

Zygmuntowo [zɨɡmunˈtɔvɔ] is a village in the administrative district of Gmina Glinojeck, within Ciechanów County, Masovian Voivodeship, in east-central Poland.
