= Działy, Ciechanów County =

Działy
- Village
- Location within Poland
- Coordinates: 52°51′37″N 20°23′08″E
- Country: Poland
- Voivodeship: Masovian
- County: Ciechanów
- Gmina: Glinojeck

Działy [ˈd͡ʑawɨ] is a village in the administrative district of Gmina Glinojeck, within Ciechanów County, Masovian Voivodeship, in northeastern Poland.
