= Bielawy, Ciechanów County =

Bielawy
- Village
- Location within Poland
- Coordinates: 52°45′55″N 20°24′32″E
- Country: Poland
- Voivodeship: Masovian
- County: Ciechanów
- Gmina: Glinojeck

Bielawy [bjɛˈlavɨ] is a village in the administrative district of Gmina Glinojeck, within Ciechanów County, Masovian Voivodeship, in east-central Poland.
