= Mołstowa =

River in Poland

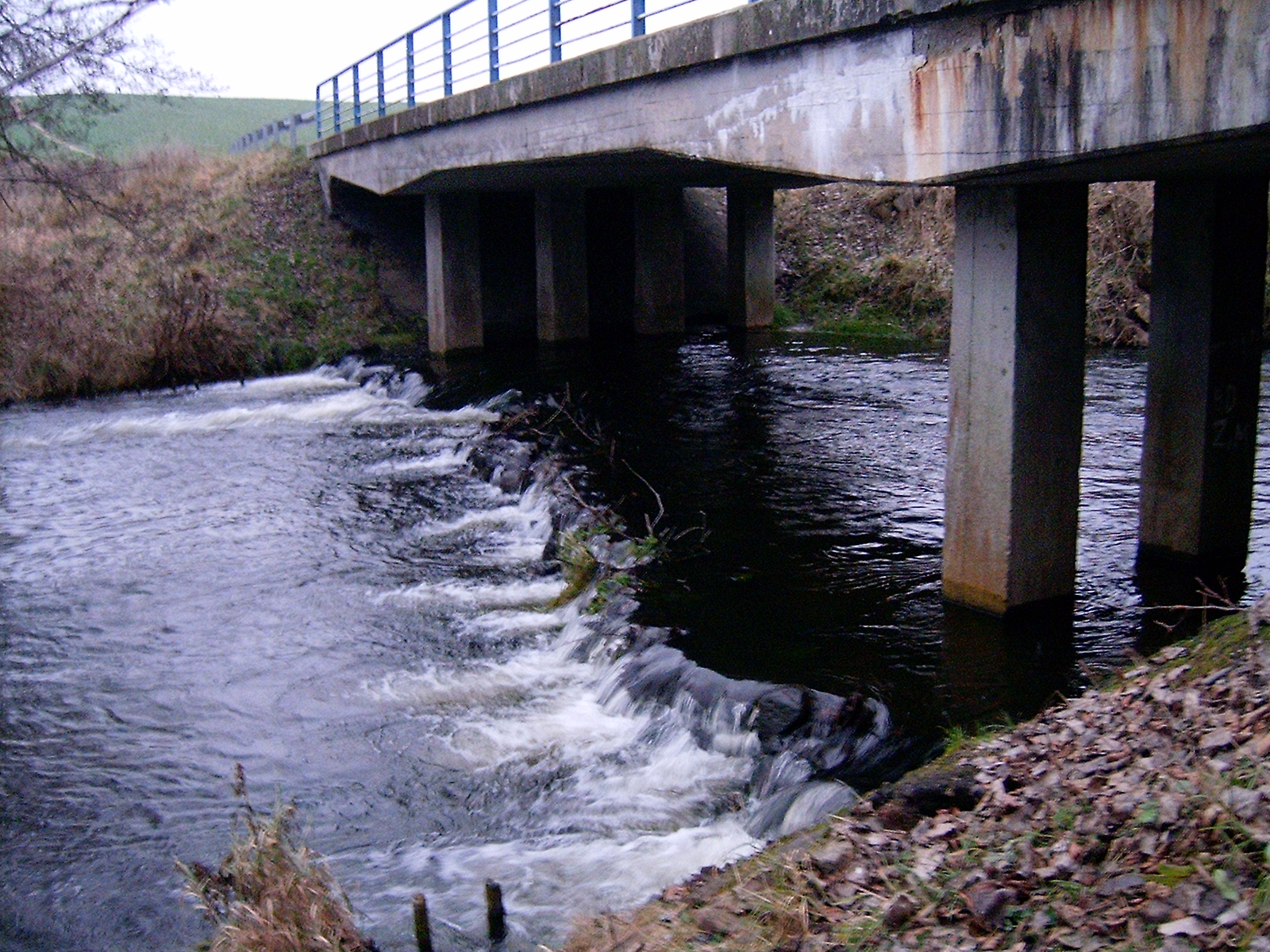
- Mołstowa flowing through Bielikowo

Location
- Country: Poland
- Voivodeship: West Pomeranian

Physical characteristics
- Source
  - location: north of Naćmierz, Łobez County
  - coordinates: 53°44′43″N 15°36′03″E
  - elevation: 70 m (230 ft)
- Mouth: Rega
  - location: west of Bielikowo, Gryfice County
  - coordinates: 53°59′11″N 15°17′39″E
  - elevation: 7 m (23 ft)
- Length: 48.9 km (30.4 mi) – 57 km (35 mi)
- Basin size: 371.5 km^{2} (143.4 mi^{2}) – 377 km^{2} (146 mi^{2})

Basin features
- Progression: Rega→ Baltic Sea

Mołstowa is a river of Poland. It is a right-bank tributary of the Rega river near Bielikowo.

In 2025, the ecosystem of the river was significantly damaged by non-permitted earthworks and heavy machinery use.
