= Kowalewko, Ciechanów County =

Kowalewko
- Village
- Location within Poland
- Coordinates: 52°49′46″N 20°16′1″E
- Country: Poland
- Voivodeship: Masovian
- County: Ciechanów
- Gmina: Glinojeck

Kowalewko [kɔvaˈlɛfkɔ] is a village in the administrative district of Gmina Glinojeck, within Ciechanów County, Masovian Voivodeship, in east-central Poland.
