= Nowa Wieś Królewska, Kuyavian-Pomeranian Voivodeship =

Nowa Wieś Królewska
- Village
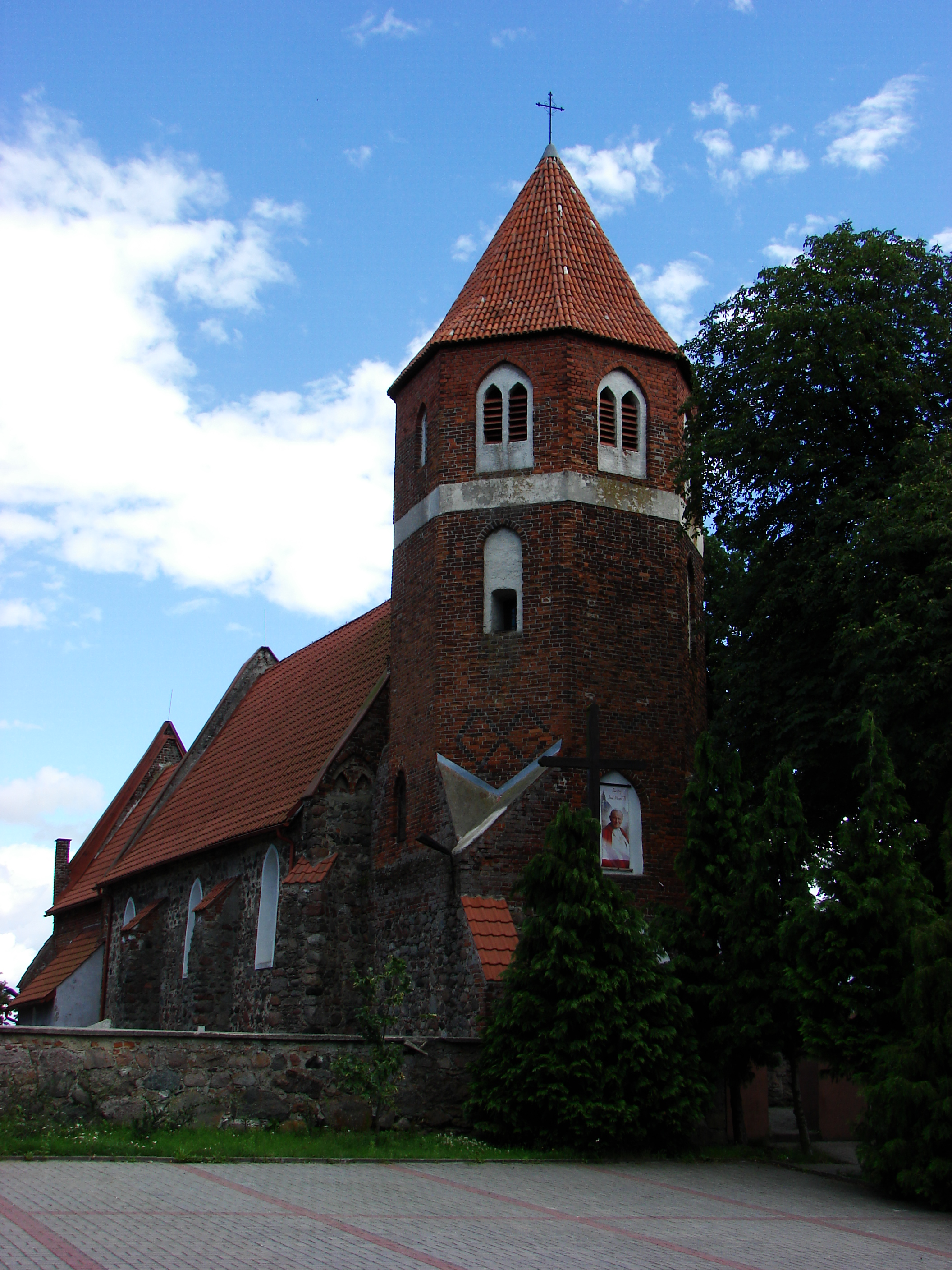
- Church of Saint John the Baptist. Built about 1300.

- Location within Poland
- Coordinates: 53°19′18″N 18°50′12″E
- Country: Poland
- Voivodeship: Kuyavian-Pomeranian
- County: Wąbrzeźno
- Gmina: Płużnica

Nowa Wieś Królewska [ˈnɔva ˈvjɛɕ kruˈlɛfska] is a village in the administrative district of Gmina Płużnica, within Wąbrzeźno County, Kuyavian-Pomeranian Voivodeship, in north-central Poland.
