= Gwda =

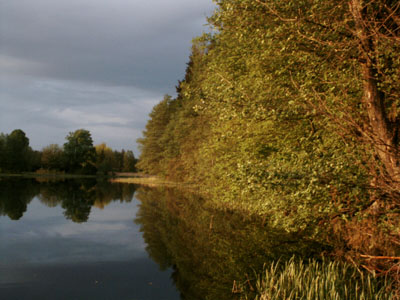
- Gwda near Piła

Physical characteristics
- Mouth
  - location: Noteć
  - coordinates: 53.0551°N 16.726°E
- Length: 140 km (87 mi)
- Basin size: 4,947 km^{2} (1,910 sq mi)
- Discharge
  - average: 27.9 m^{3}/s (990 cu ft/s)

Basin features
- Progression: Noteć→ Warta→ Oder→ Baltic Sea

The Gwda (Polish: [ɡvda]; German: Küddow) is a river in Poland, a tributary of the Noteć. It has a length of 140 km (87 mi) and a basin area of 4,947 km^{2} (1,910 mi^{2}). It begins at Lake Studnica, northeast of Szczecinek. Its upper course flows through many lakes. It runs through the town of Piła.

Special fishing rules and regulations regarding trout are in effect for the following sections of the Gwda:

- Downstream from Koszalin Province boundary and upstream from road bridge in Ledyczek excluding reservoir between Wegorzewo and Lomczewo.
- Downstream from road bridge in Ledyczek and upstream from Podgaje Reservoir.
- Downstream from dam in Tarnowka and upstream from road bridge in Krepsko.

The water of the Gwda was one of the purest in Poland in 1975. However, the water flows have since been degraded due to cities pumping non-processed sewage and industrial plants flushing chemicals and oil.
