= Rumoka, Ciechanów County =

Rumoka
- Village
- Location within Poland
- Coordinates: 53°5′0″N 20°13′0″E
- Country: Poland
- Voivodeship: Masovian
- County: Ciechanów
- Gmina: Glinojeck

Rumoka [ruˈmɔka] is a village in the administrative district of Gmina Glinojeck, within Ciechanów County, Masovian Voivodeship, in east-central Poland.
