= Rega (river) =

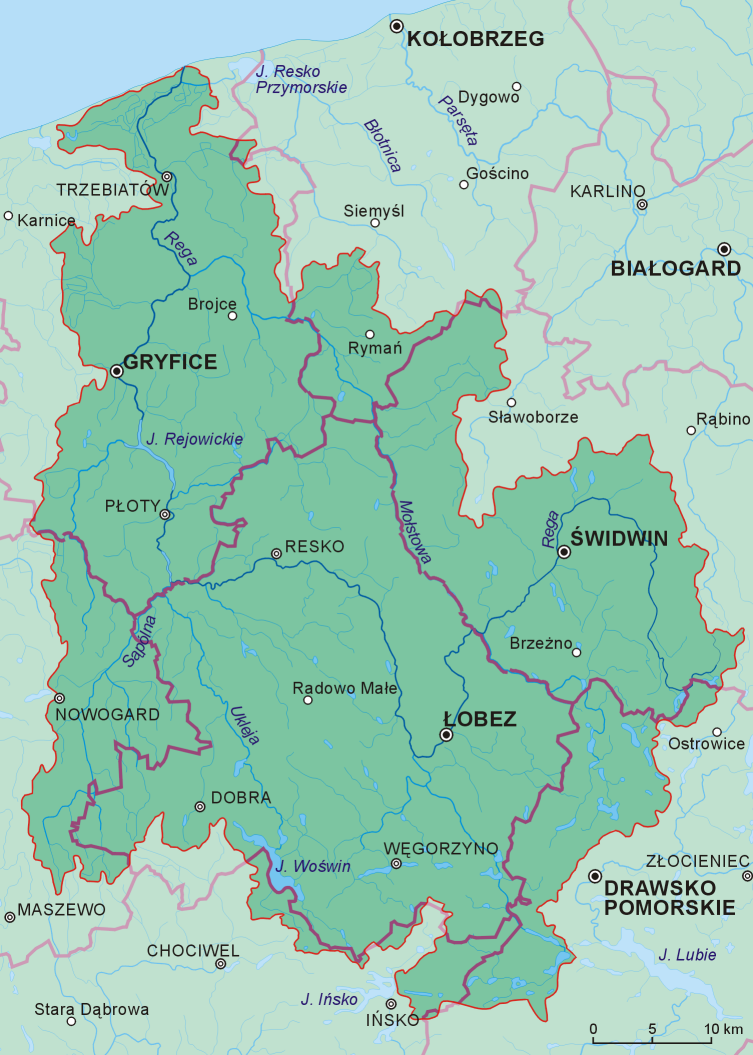
- Rega Basin

Location
- Country: Poland

Physical characteristics
- Source
  - location: near Imienko
  - elevation: 177.5 m (582 ft)
- Mouth
  - location: Baltic Sea
  - coordinates: 54.1462°N 15.2854°E
- Length: 188 km (117 mi)
- Basin size: 2,767 km^{2} (1,068 sq mi)
- Discharge
  - average: 21.1 m^{3}/s (750 cu ft/s)

Basin features
- Progression: West then North
- Tributaries
  - left: Ukleja, Stara Rega (river), Reska Węgorza
  - right: Mołstowa, Rekowa

The Rega is a river in north-western Poland, flowing into the Baltic Sea. It is the country's 24th longest river, with a total length of 188 km and a catchment area of 2,767 km^{2}.

== Towns ==
The following towns are situated on the Rega:

- Świdwin
- Łobez
- Resko
- Płoty
- Gryfice
- Trzebiatów
- Mrzeżyno

== Tributaries ==
The following rivers are tributaries of the Rega:

- Brzeźnicka Węgorza
- Gardominka
- Mołstowa

== Images ==
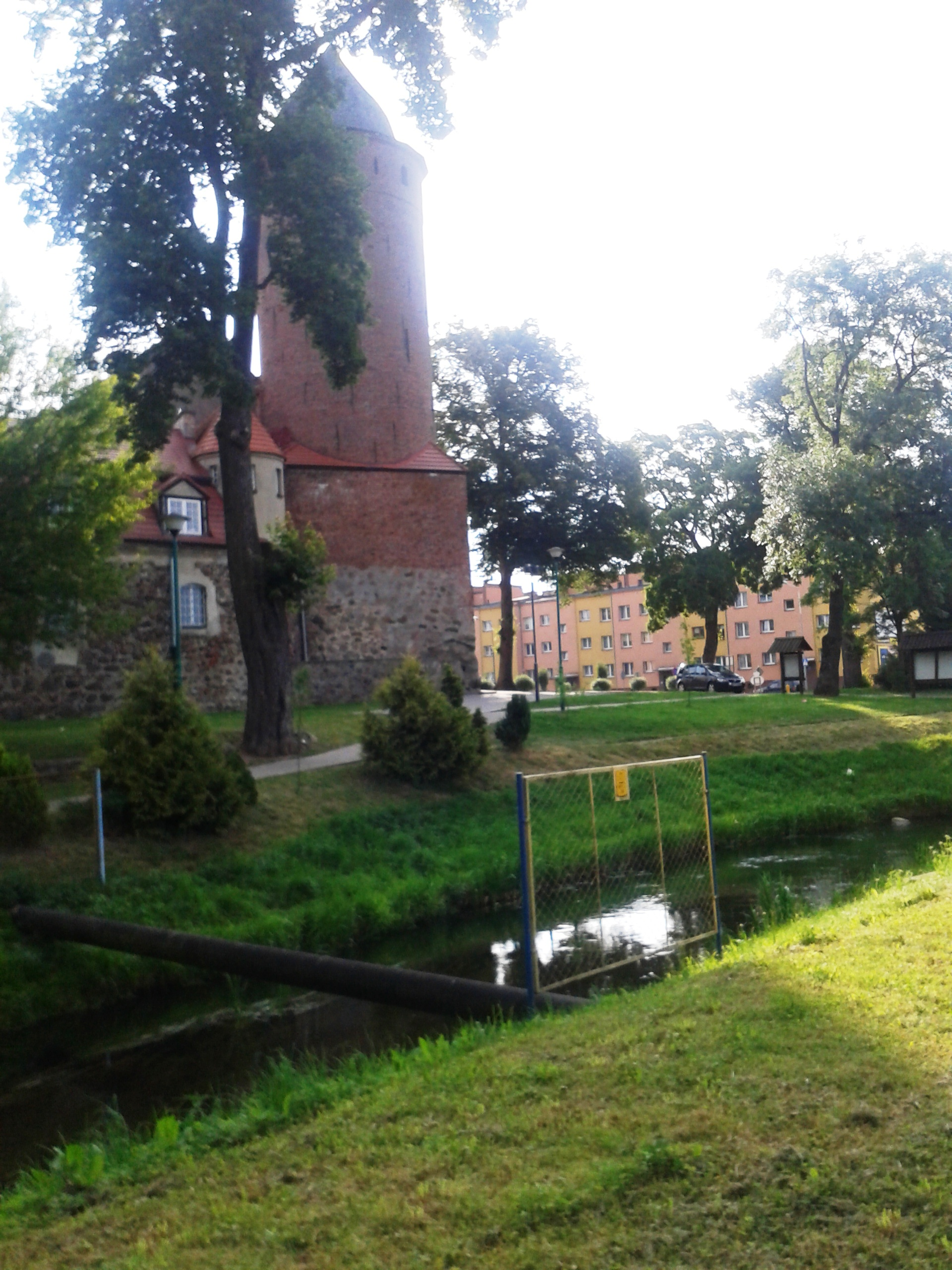
Świdwin

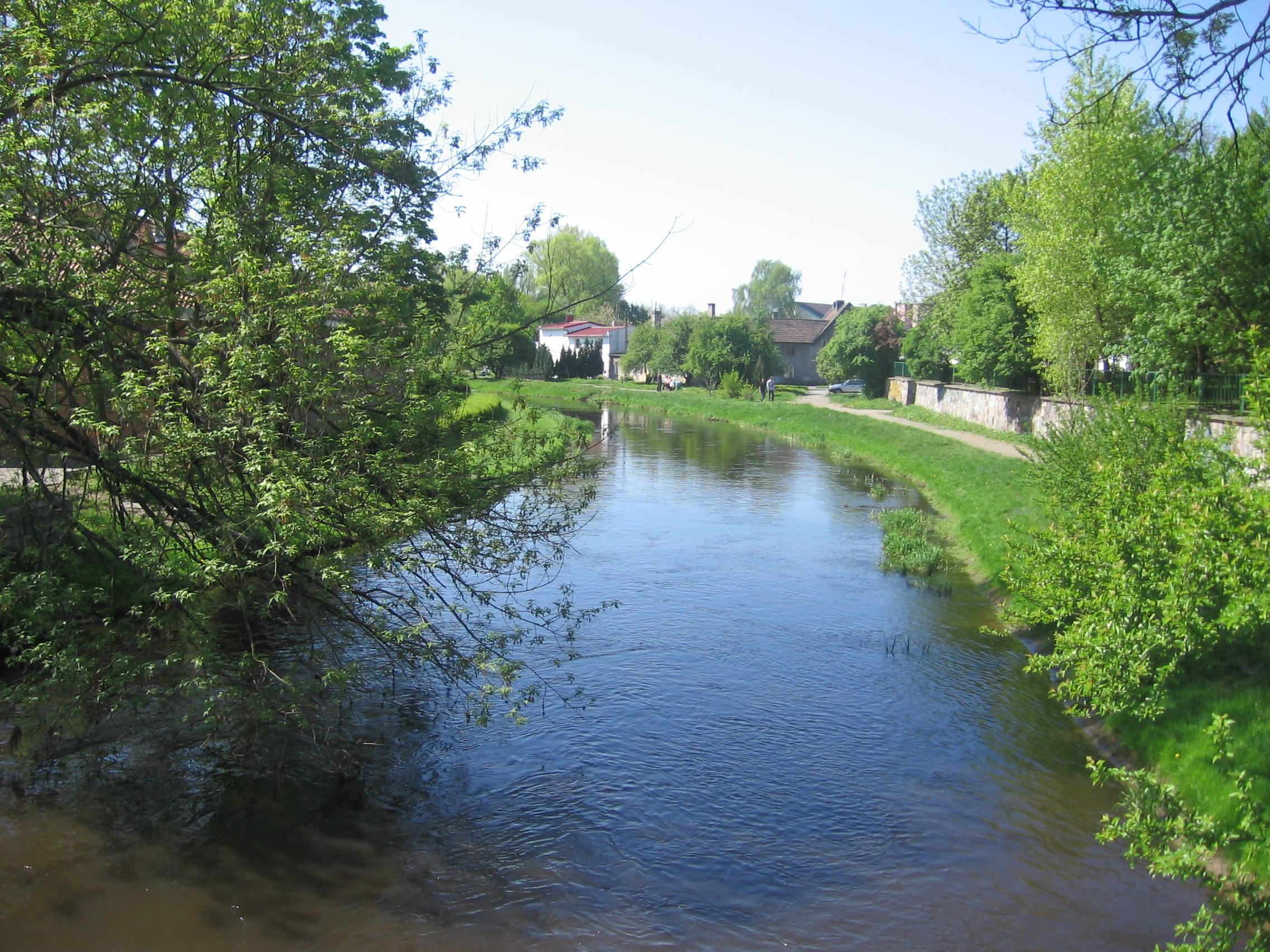
Łobez

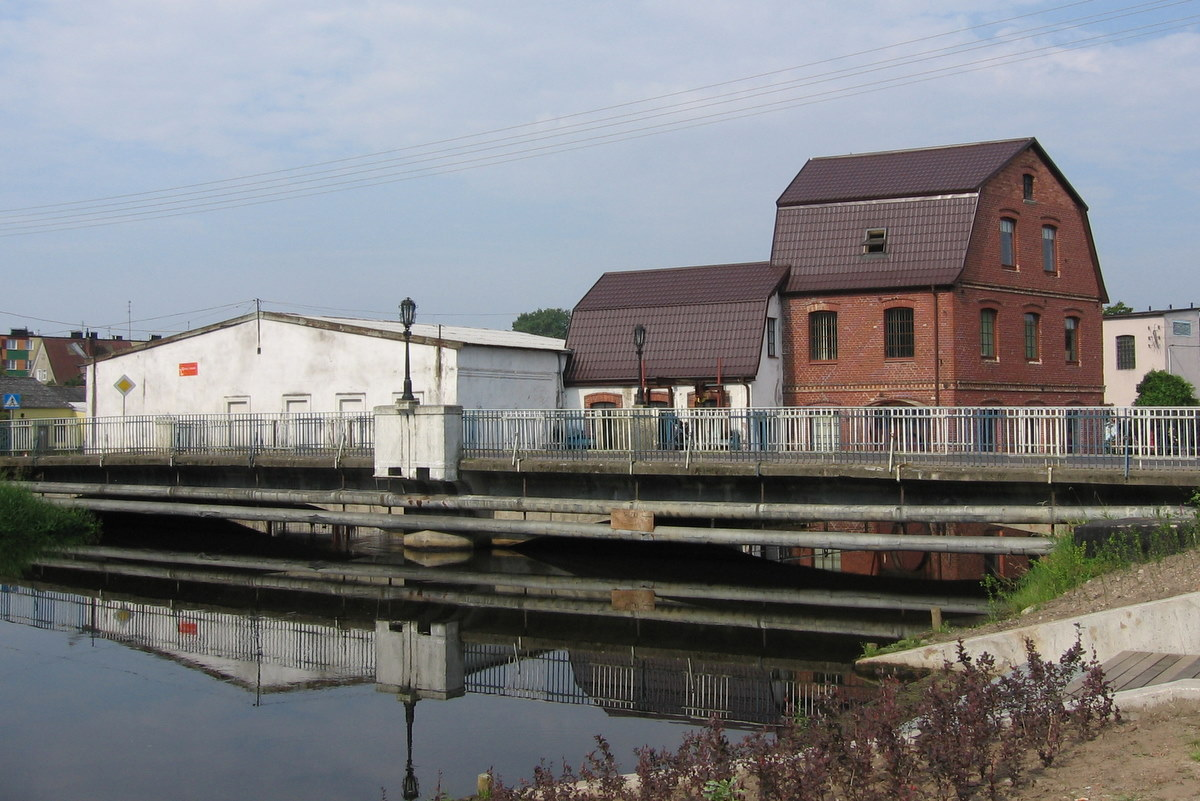
Resko

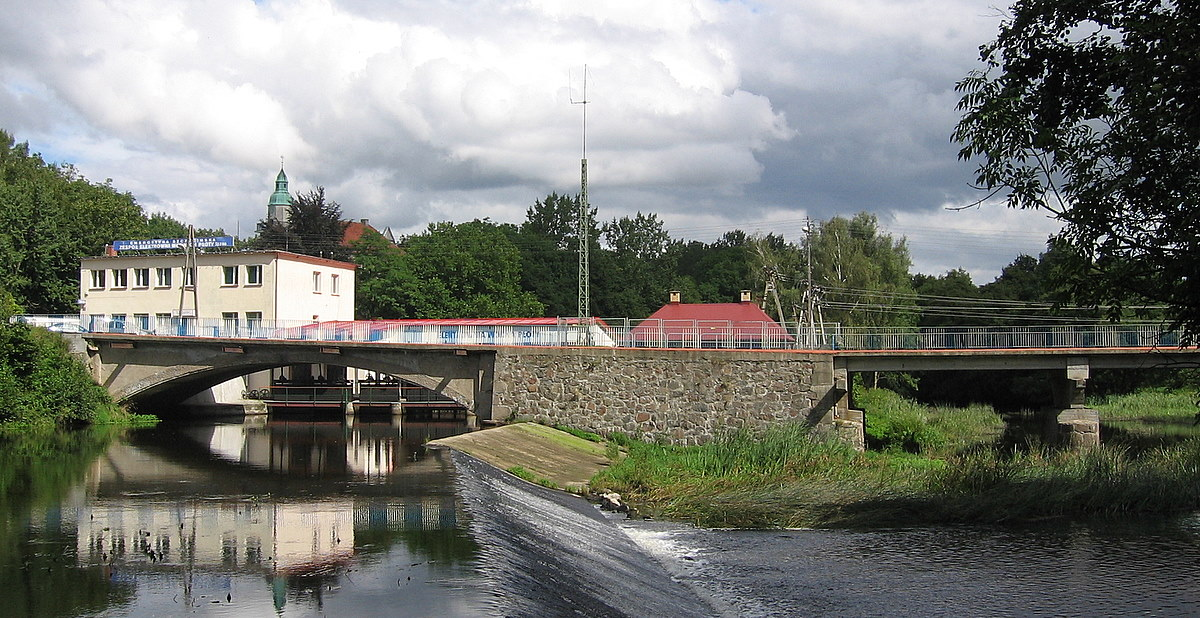
Płoty

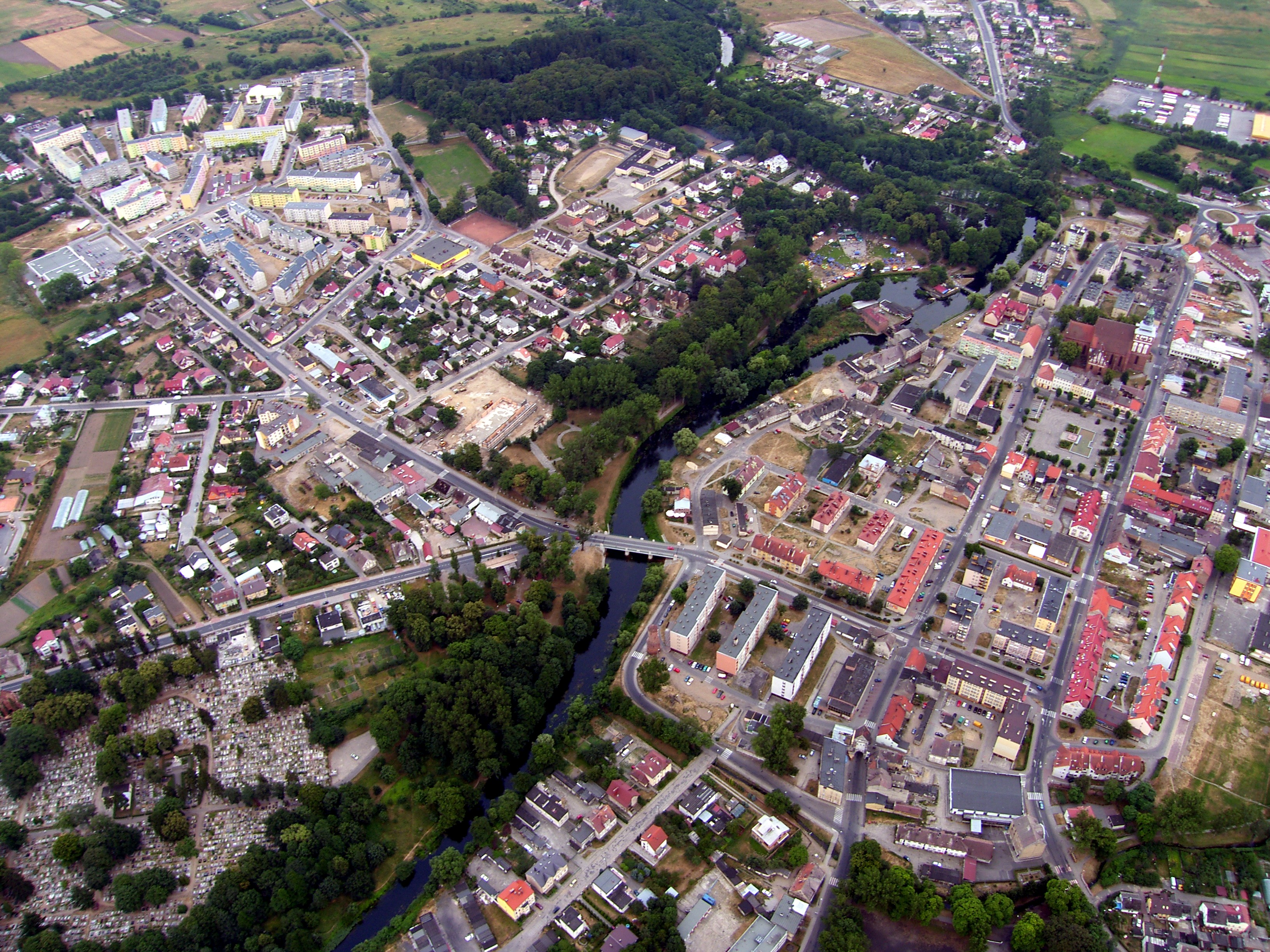
Gryfice

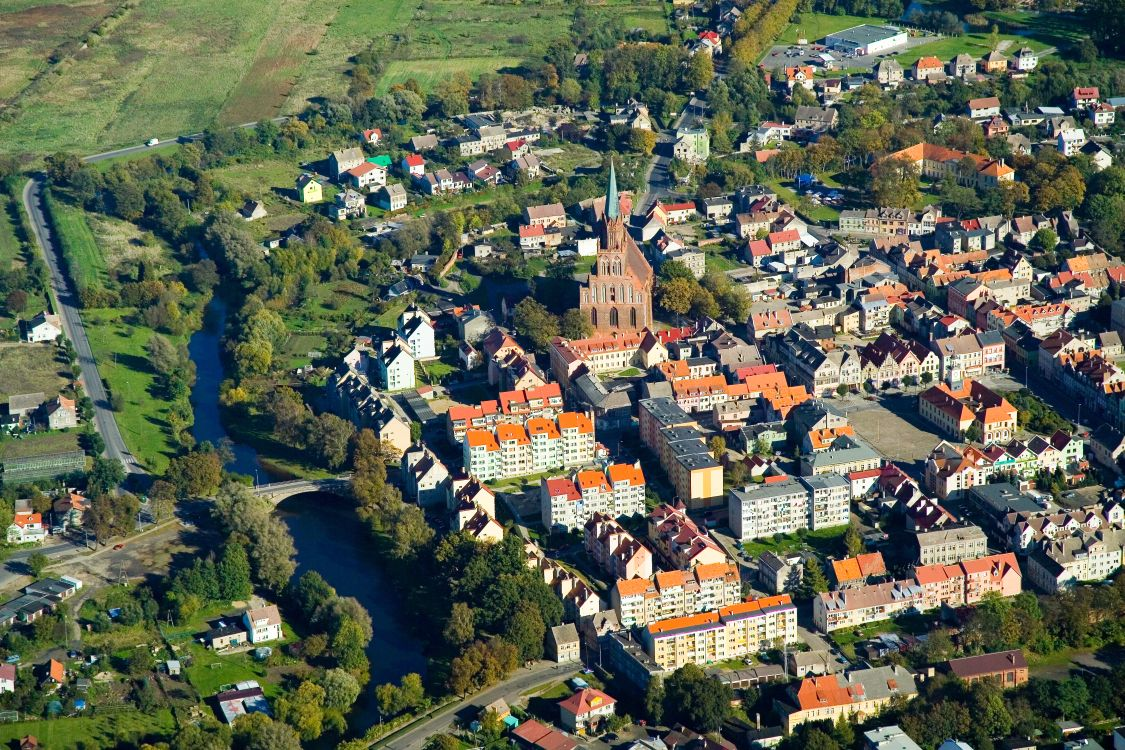
Trzebiatów

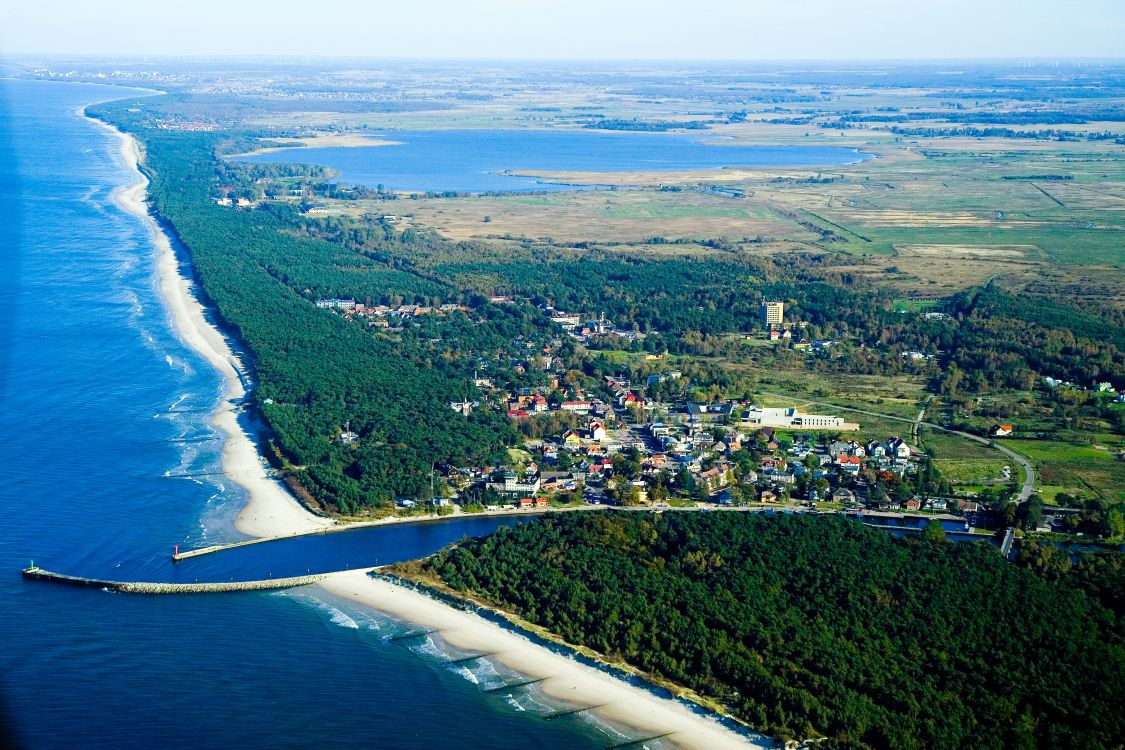
Mrzeżyno - (Baltic Sea)

== See also ==
- List of rivers in Poland
- Conflict over rafting on the Rega
