= Świnarski =

Doliwa coat of arms, used by some of Świnarski family

Świnarski (feminine: Świnarska) is a Polish surname, derived from the adjectival form for Świniary (Świnary). Some of them use Doliwa coat of arms or Poraj coat of arms. It may be transliterated as: Swinarski, Swinarska, Swinarsky, Svinarski, Svinarska, Svinarsky, Schwinarski, Schwinarsky. Notable people with the surname include:

- Donald T. Swinarski (1935–2006), American businessman and politician
- Konrad Swinarski (1929–1975), Polish director
- Stanisław Świnarski (1900–1961), Polish general
- Theodore Swinarski (1905–1992), American politician and businessman

== See also ==
- Świniarski
- Svinarski dol
