= Żuków =

Żuków may refer to the following villages in Poland:

- Żuków, Lower Silesian Voivodeship (south-west Poland)
- Żuków, Włodawa County in Lublin Voivodeship (east Poland)
- Żuków, Zamość County in Lublin Voivodeship (east Poland)
- Żuków, Busko County in Świętokrzyskie Voivodeship (south-central Poland)
- Żuków, Subcarpathian Voivodeship (south-east Poland)
- Żuków, Gmina Grodzisk Mazowiecki in Masovian Voivodeship (east-central Poland)
- Żuków, Mińsk County in Masovian Voivodeship (east-central Poland)
- Żuków, Przysucha County in Masovian Voivodeship (east-central Poland)
- Żuków, Siedlce County in Masovian Voivodeship (east-central Poland)
- Żuków, Sochaczew County in Masovian Voivodeship (east-central Poland)
- Żuków, Lubusz Voivodeship (west Poland)
- Żuków, West Pomeranian Voivodeship (north-west Poland)

For places in the Czech Republic, see Žukov (disambiguation)

For places in Ukraine, see Zhukiv (disambiguation)
