= Senator Swinarski =

Senator Swinarski may refer to:

- Donald T. Swinarski (1935–2006), Illinois State Senate
- Theodore Swinarski (1905–1992), Illinois State Senate
