= Ludwinów, Busko County =

Ludwinów
- Village
- Location within Poland
- Coordinates: 50°20′12″N 20°56′2″E
- Country: Poland
- Voivodeship: Świętokrzyskie
- County: Busko
- Gmina: Solec-Zdrój

Ludwinów [ludˈvinuf] is a village in the administrative district of Gmina Solec-Zdrój, within Busko County, Świętokrzyskie Voivodeship, in south-central Poland. It lies approximately 5 km (3 mi) south-east of Solec-Zdrój, 22 km (14 mi) south-east of Busko-Zdrój, and 65 km (40 mi) south of the regional capital Kielce.
