= Magierów =

- Village
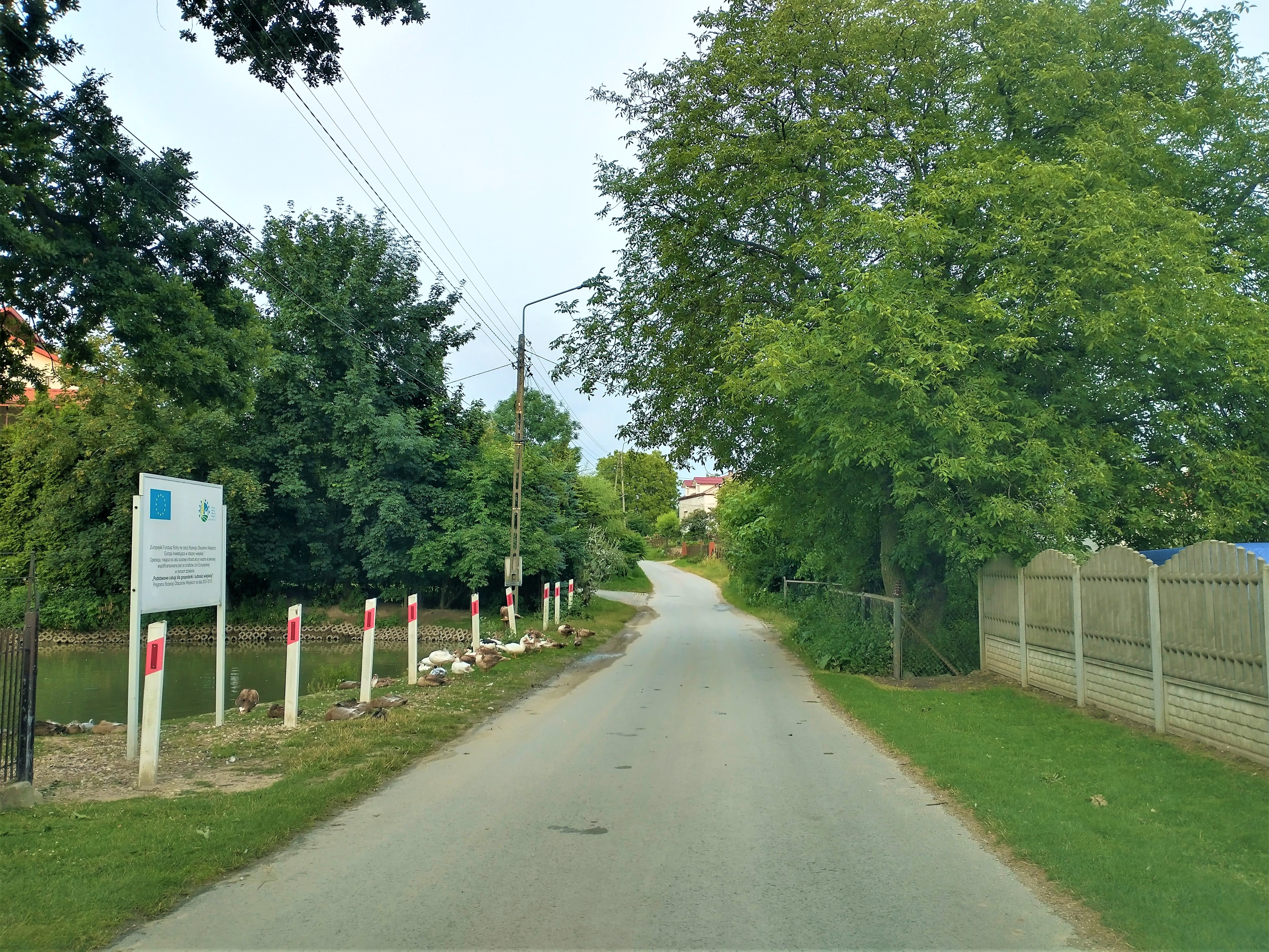

- Location within Poland
- Coordinates: 50°24′2″N 20°54′48″E
- Country: Poland
- Voivodeship: Świętokrzyskie
- County: Busko
- Gmina: Solec-Zdrój

Magierów [maˈɡʲɛruf] is a village in the administrative district of Gmina Solec-Zdrój, within Busko County, Świętokrzyskie Voivodeship, in south-central Poland. It lies approximately 5 km (3 mi) north-east of Solec-Zdrój, 16 km (10 mi) south-east of Busko-Zdrój, and 58 km (36 mi) south of the regional capital Kielce.
