= Jan Gruszczyński =

Medieval bishop of Kraków

His Excellency Jan Gruszczynski
- Archbishop of Gniezno; Primate of Poland
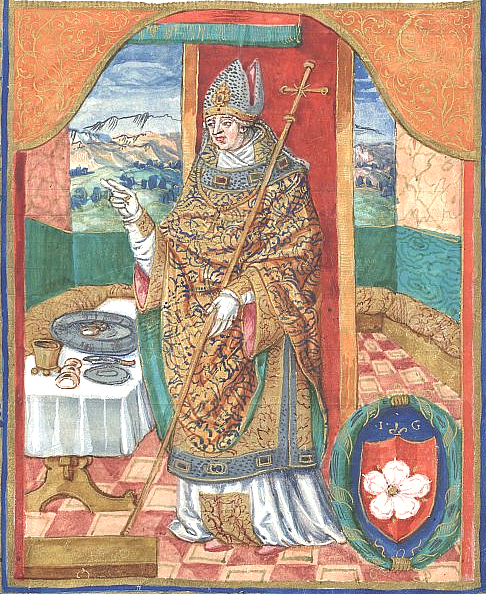
- Church: Roman Catholic
- Archdiocese: Gniezno
- Installed: 1464
- Term ended: 1473

Personal details
- Born: 1405
- Died: 1473 (aged 67–68) Kraków
- Coat of arms: Jan Gruszczynski's coat of arms

Jan Gruszczyński was a medieval Bishop of Kraków, Kujawski, Archbishop of Gniezno, Chancellor of the Crown, and active diplomat.

== Early life ==
He was born at Sieradz, Central Poland in 1405 AD into the Poraj Polish noble family. He was the son of John Sieradzki, a military officer of Gruszczyce, and his wife Margaret of Naramowice.

He studied at the Jagiellonian University from 1431 to 1440, while working in the office of the king. In 1440, he travelled with King Władysław III of Varna to Hungary and then two years later took up in the rectory in his home town of Sieradz. He also worked in the office of Casimir the Great, being one of the co-authors of Casmir's centralizing policy.

== Episcopal career ==
In 1450 he was appointed Bishop of Kujawski and was consecrated on 12 January 1451 in the church of the Holy Cross in Circle His politics saw him engage with the Prussians and he was politically active in the thirteen year war. In 1463 became bishop of Kraków and archbishop of Gniezno from 1463 – 1472.

In 1463 and 1466 he led diplomatic delegations to the Teutonic Knights in Brest Kujawski, and Toruń.

Although he took ill in 1469 he managed a number of other missions but he died suddenly in Kraków on 8th or 9 October 1473 and was buried in Gniezno Cathedral, where his successor John devoted a magnificent tombstone of red marble. This now rests in a church founded by the Gruszczyńskich family in their estates near Iwanowice, Southern Poland.

Preceded by Jan Taszka Koniecpolski	Grand Chancellor of the Crown; 1450–unknown	Succeeded by Unknown
Catholic Church titles
Preceded by Mikołaj Lasocki	Bishop of Kujawy; 1450–1463	Succeeded by Jan Lutek
Preceded by Jan II ze Szprewy	Bishop of Gniezno; 1464–1473	Succeeded by Jakub III Siemieński
Preceded by Jakub of Sienno	Bishop of Kraków; 1463–1464	Succeeded by Jan Lutek
