= Zborów, Świętokrzyskie Voivodeship =

Zborów
- Village
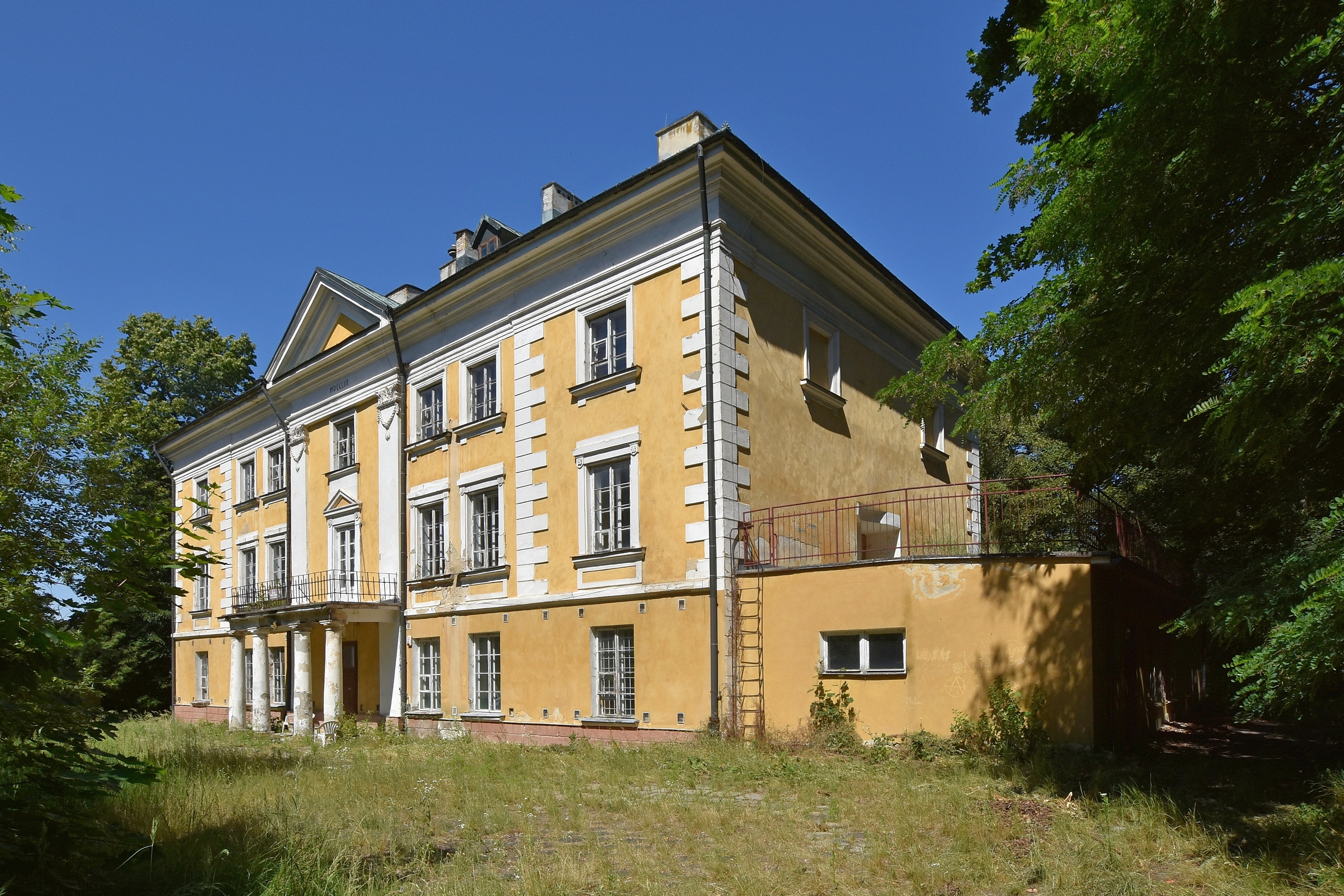
- Palace

- Location within Poland
- Coordinates: 50°23′4″N 20°53′58″E
- Country: Poland
- Voivodeship: Świętokrzyskie
- County: Busko
- Gmina: Solec-Zdrój

Zborów [ˈzbɔruf] is a village in the administrative district of Gmina Solec-Zdrój, within Busko County, Świętokrzyskie Voivodeship, in south-central Poland. It lies approximately 3 km (2 mi) north-east of Solec-Zdrój, 16 km (10 mi) south-east of Busko-Zdrój, and 59 km (37 mi) south of the regional capital Kielce.

Palace in Zborów, ca 1936

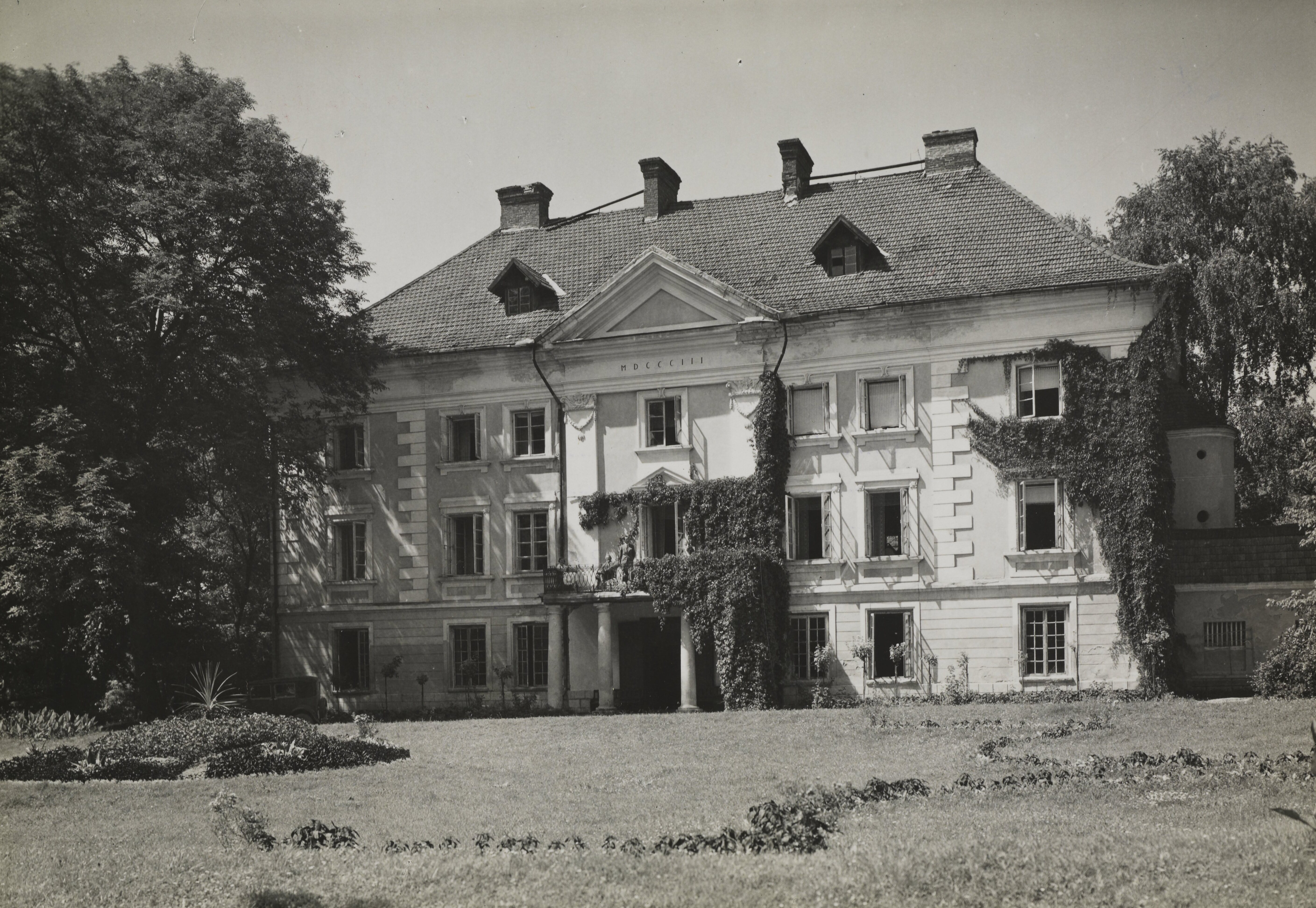

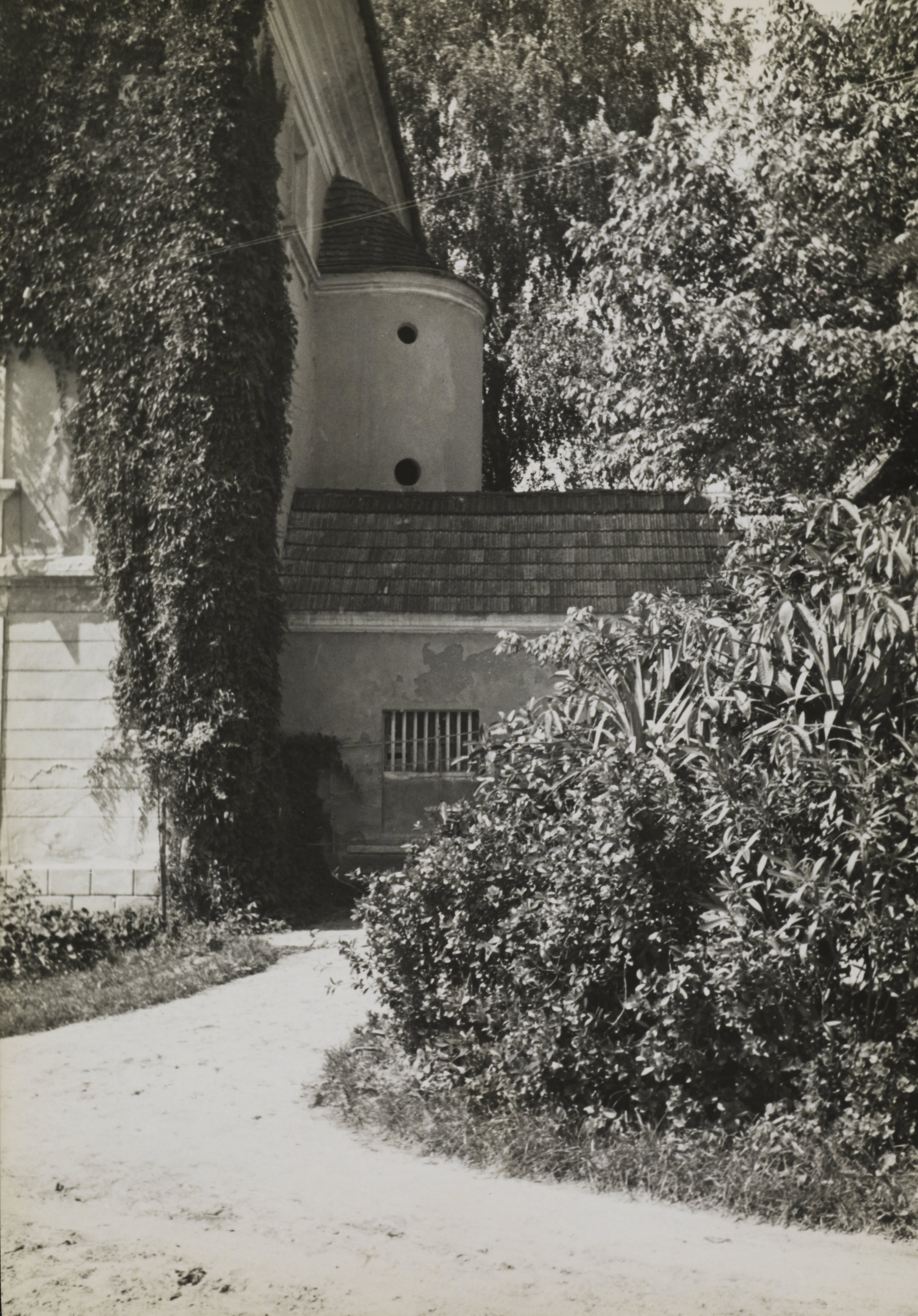

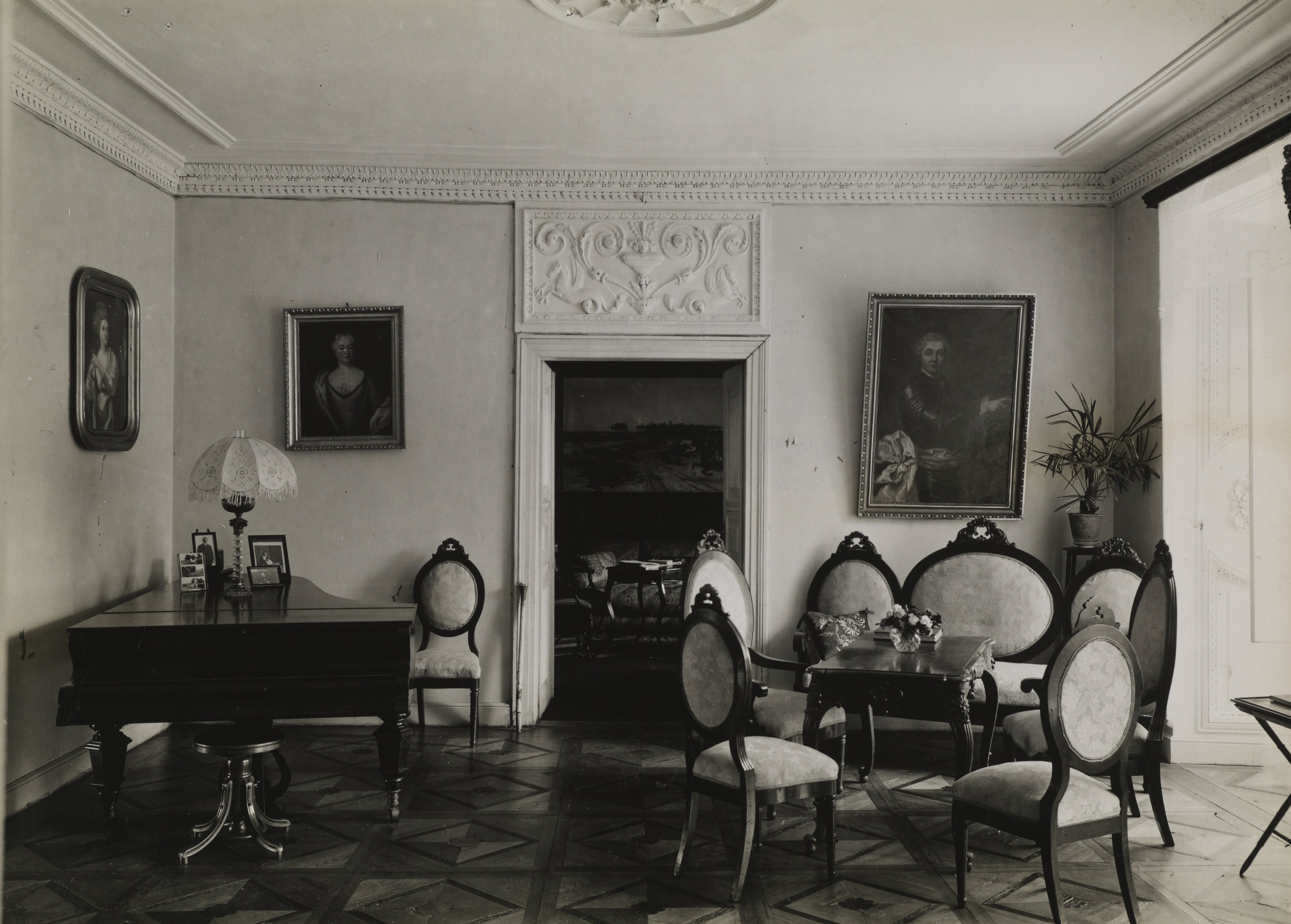
