= Świniary =

Świniary may refer to the following places in Poland:

- Świniary, Góra County in Lower Silesian Voivodeship (south-west Poland)
- Świniary, Oleśnica County in Lower Silesian Voivodeship (south-west Poland)
- Świniary, Łódź Voivodeship (central Poland)
- Świniary, Lesser Poland Voivodeship (south Poland)
- Świniary, Świętokrzyskie Voivodeship (south-central Poland)
- Świniary, Płock County in Masovian Voivodeship (east-central Poland)
- Świniary, Przasnysz County in Masovian Voivodeship (east-central Poland)
- Świniary, Siedlce County in Masovian Voivodeship (east-central Poland)
- Świniary, Greater Poland Voivodeship (west-central Poland)
- Świniary, Międzyrzecz County in Lubusz Voivodeship (west Poland)
- Świniary, Słubice County in Lubusz Voivodeship (west Poland)
- Świniary Nowe a village in Sandomierz County, Świętokrzyskie Voivodeship (south-central Poland)

== See also ==
- Świnarski
- Świniarski
