= Chinków =

- Village
- Location within Poland
- Coordinates: 50°21′N 20°51′E
- Country: Poland
- Voivodeship: Świętokrzyskie
- County: Busko
- Gmina: Solec-Zdrój

Chinków [ˈxinkuf] is a village in the administrative district of Gmina Solec-Zdrój, within Busko County, Świętokrzyskie Voivodeship, in south-central Poland. It lies approximately 4 km (2 mi) south-west of Solec-Zdrój, 17 km (11 mi) south-east of Busko-Zdrój, and 62 km (39 mi) south of the regional capital Kielce.
