= Włosnowice =

- Village
- Location within Poland
- Coordinates: 50°23′N 20°56′E
- Country: Poland
- Voivodeship: Świętokrzyskie
- County: Busko
- Gmina: Solec-Zdrój

Włosnowice [vwɔsnɔˈvit͡sɛ] is a village in the administrative district of Gmina Solec-Zdrój, within Busko County, Świętokrzyskie Voivodeship, in south-central Poland. It lies approximately 4 km (2 mi) north-east of Solec-Zdrój, 18 km (11 mi) south-east of Busko-Zdrój, and 60 km (37 mi) south of the regional capital Kielce.
