= Piasek Mały =

- Village
- Location within Poland
- Coordinates: 50°23′47″N 20°50′2″E
- Country: Poland
- Voivodeship: Świętokrzyskie
- County: Busko
- Gmina: Solec-Zdrój

Piasek Mały [ˈpjasɛk ˈmawɨ] is a village in the administrative district of Gmina Solec-Zdrój, within Busko County, Świętokrzyskie Voivodeship, in south-central Poland. It lies approximately 6 km (4 mi) north-west of Solec-Zdrój, 12 km (7 mi) south-east of Busko-Zdrój, and 57 km (35 mi) south of the regional capital Kielce.
