= Sułkowice (disambiguation) =

Sułkowice may refer to the following places:

- Sułkowice in Lesser Poland Voivodeship (south Poland)
- Sułkowice, Kraków County in Lesser Poland Voivodeship (south Poland)
- Sułkowice, Wadowice County in Lesser Poland Voivodeship (south Poland)
- Sułkowice, Świętokrzyskie Voivodeship (south-central Poland)
- Sułkowice, Masovian Voivodeship (east-central Poland)
- Sułkowice, Greater Poland Voivodeship (west-central Poland)
