= Wełnin =

- Village
- Location within Poland
- Coordinates: 50°20′51″N 20°53′45″E
- Country: Poland
- Voivodeship: Świętokrzyskie
- County: Busko
- Gmina: Solec-Zdrój

Wełnin [ˈvɛu̯nin] is a village in the administrative district of Gmina Solec-Zdrój, within Busko County, Świętokrzyskie Voivodeship, in south-central Poland. It lies approximately 3 km (2 mi) south of Solec-Zdrój, 19 km (12 mi) south-east of Busko-Zdrój, and 63 km (39 mi) south of the regional capital Kielce.
