= Zagajów-Kolonia =

- Village
- Location within Poland
- Coordinates: 50°22′10″N 20°49′7″E
- Country: Poland
- Voivodeship: Świętokrzyskie
- County: Busko
- Gmina: Solec-Zdrój

Zagajów-Kolonia [zaˈɡajuf kɔˈlɔɲa] is a village in the administrative district of Gmina Solec-Zdrój, within Busko County, Świętokrzyskie Voivodeship, in south-central Poland. It lies approximately 5 km (3 mi) west of Solec-Zdrój, 13 km (8 mi) south-east of Busko-Zdrój, and 59 km (37 mi) south of the regional capital Kielce.
