= Kików =

- Village
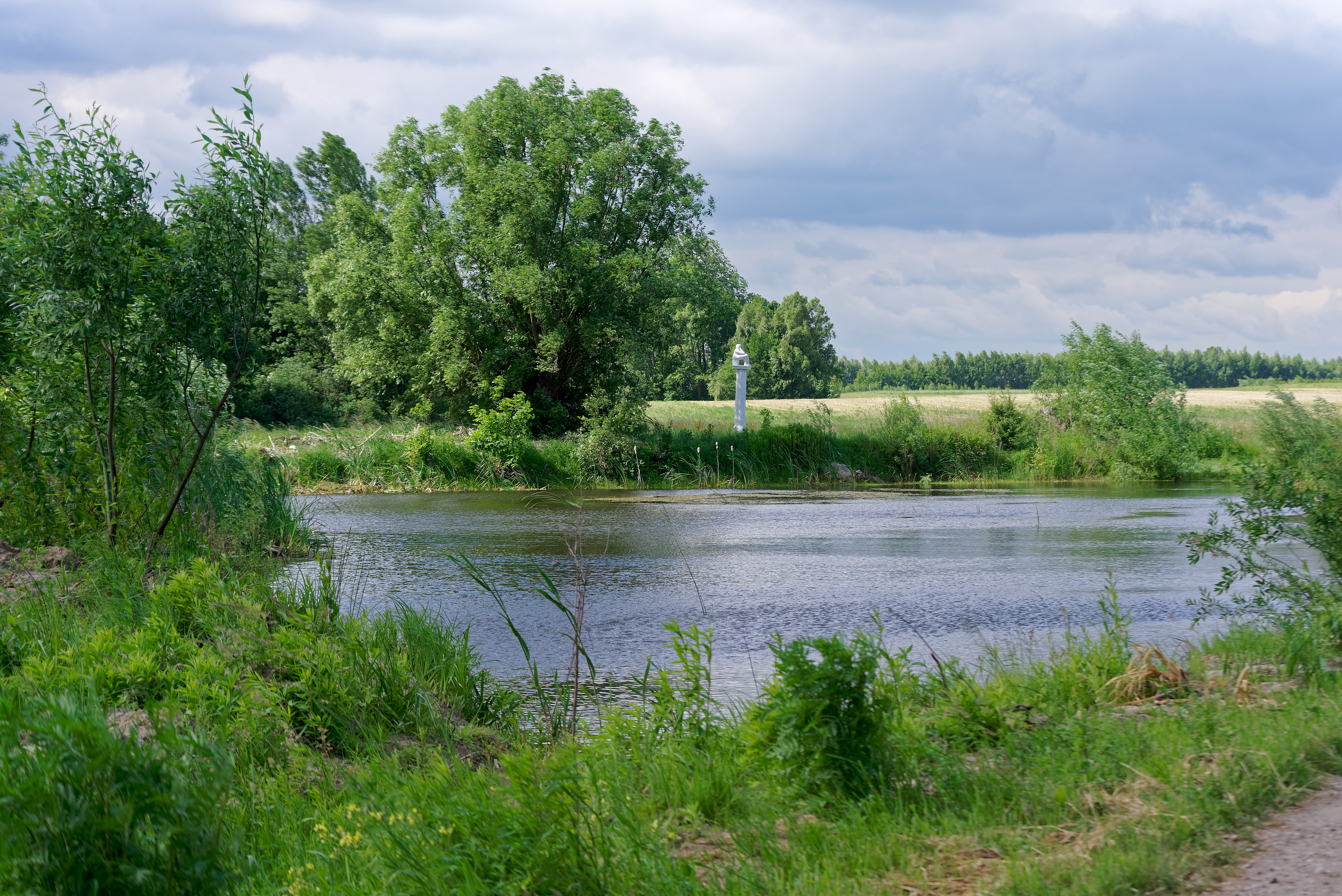
- Pond

- Location within Poland
- Coordinates: 50°24′30″N 20°52′3″E
- Country: Poland
- Voivodeship: Świętokrzyskie
- County: Busko
- Gmina: Solec-Zdrój

Kików [ˈkikuf] is a village in the administrative district of Gmina Solec-Zdrój, within Busko County, Świętokrzyskie Voivodeship, in south-central Poland. It lies approximately 5 km (3 mi) north of Solec-Zdrój, 13 km (8 mi) south-east of Busko-Zdrój, and 56 km (35 mi) south of the regional capital Kielce.
