= Zielonki =

Zielonki may refer to the following places:

- Zielonki, Lesser Poland Voivodeship (south Poland)
- Zielonki, Busko County in Świętokrzyskie Voivodeship (south-central Poland)
- Zielonki, Jędrzejów County in Świętokrzyskie Voivodeship (south-central Poland)
- Zielonki, Masovian Voivodeship (east-central Poland)
- Zielonki, Pomeranian Voivodeship (north Poland)
