= Zagajów =

Zagajów may refer to the following places:

- Zagajów, Busko County in Świętokrzyskie Voivodeship (south-central Poland)
- Zagajów, Kazimierza County in Świętokrzyskie Voivodeship (south-central Poland)
- Zagajów, Pińczów County in Świętokrzyskie Voivodeship (south-central Poland)
