= Zagaje Kikowskie =

- Village
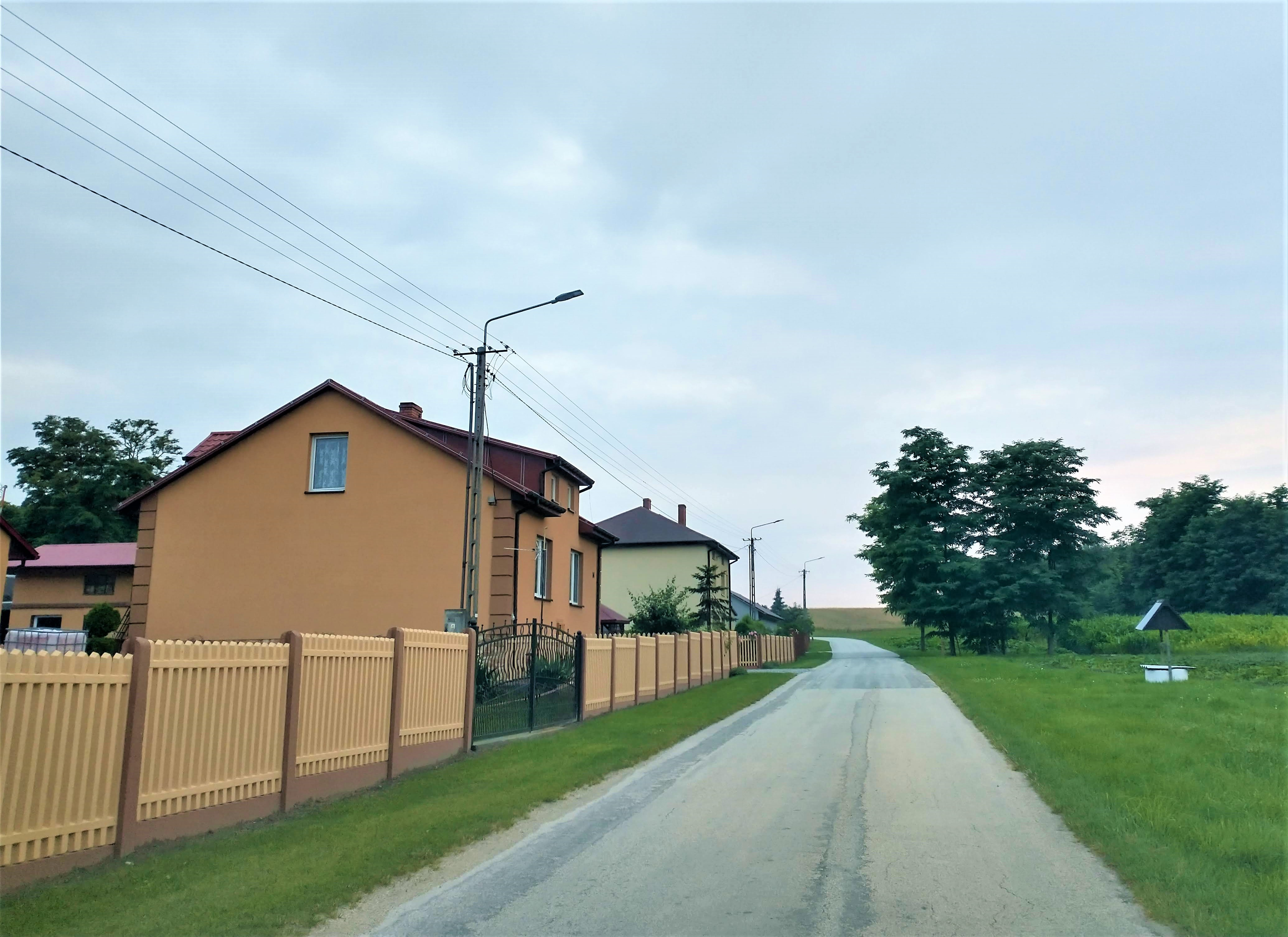

- Location within Poland
- Coordinates: 50°25′4″N 20°52′32″E
- Country: Poland
- Voivodeship: Świętokrzyskie
- County: Busko
- Gmina: Solec-Zdrój

Zagaje Kikowskie [zaˈɡajɛ kiˈkɔfskʲɛ] is a village in the administrative district of Gmina Solec-Zdrój, within Busko County, Świętokrzyskie Voivodeship, in south-central Poland. It lies approximately 6 km (4 mi) north of Solec-Zdrój, 13 km (8 mi) south-east of Busko-Zdrój, and 55 km (34 mi) south of the regional capital Kielce.
