= Zagórzany =

Zagórzany may refer to the following places:

- Zagórzany, Gorlice County in Lesser Poland Voivodeship (south Poland)
- Zagórzany, Wieliczka County in Lesser Poland Voivodeship (south Poland)
- Zagórzany, Świętokrzyskie Voivodeship (south-central Poland)

== See also ==
- Zagorzany
