= Piestrzec =

- Village
- Location within Poland
- Coordinates: 50°23′18″N 20°56′52″E
- Country: Poland
- Voivodeship: Świętokrzyskie
- County: Busko
- Gmina: Solec-Zdrój

Piestrzec [ˈpjɛstʂɛt͡s] is a village in the administrative district of Gmina Solec-Zdrój, within Busko County, Świętokrzyskie Voivodeship, in south-central Poland. It lies approximately 5 km (3 mi) north-east of Solec-Zdrój, 19 km (12 mi) south-east of Busko-Zdrój, and 60 km (37 mi) south-east of the regional capital Kielce.
