= Senator Bennett (disambiguation) =

Senator Bennett or Bennet may refer to:

== Members of the United States Senate ==
- Bob Bennett (politician) (1933–2016), U.S. Senator from Utah from 1993 to 2011
- Michael Bennet (born 1964), U.S. Senator from Colorado since 2009
- Wallace F. Bennett (1898–1993), U.S. Senator from Utah from 1951 to 1974

== United States state senate members ==
- Albert E. Bennett (1914–1971), Illinois State Senate
- David S. Bennett (1811–1894), New York State Senate
- Don Bennett (Alaska politician) (1931–1987), Alaska State Senate
- Frank P. Bennett Jr. (1878–1965), Massachusetts State Senate
- George Bennett (Wisconsin politician), Wisconsin State Senate
- Granville G. Bennett (1833–1910), Iowa State Senate
- Hiram Pitt Bennet (1826–1914), Colorado State Senate
- J. Henry Bennett (1876–1956), Wisconsin State Senate
- James R. Bennett (1940–2016), Alabama State Senate
- John D. Bennett (1911–2005), New York State Senate
- John O. Bennett (born 1948), New Jersey State Senate
- Ken Bennett (born 1959), Arizona State Senate
- Louis Bennett (politician) (died 1959), New York State Senate
- Mike Bennett (politician) (born 1945), Florida State Senate
- Philip Allen Bennett (1881–1942), Missouri State Senate
- Rick Bennett (politician) (born 1963), Maine State Senate
- Robert Frederick Bennett (1927–2000), Kansas State Senate
- Scott M. Bennett (born 1977), Illinois State Senate
- Stephen O. Bennett (1807–1886), Wisconsin State Senate
- Thomas W. Bennett (Idaho politician) (1831–1893), Indiana State Senate
- Thomas Bennett Jr. (1781–1865), South Carolina State Senate
- Van S. Bennett (1836–1914), Wisconsin State Senate
- Wayne D. Bennett (1927–2015), Iowa State Senate
- William M. Bennett (1869–1930), New York State Senate
