= Morgan Park Academy =

Prep school in Chicago, Illinois, US

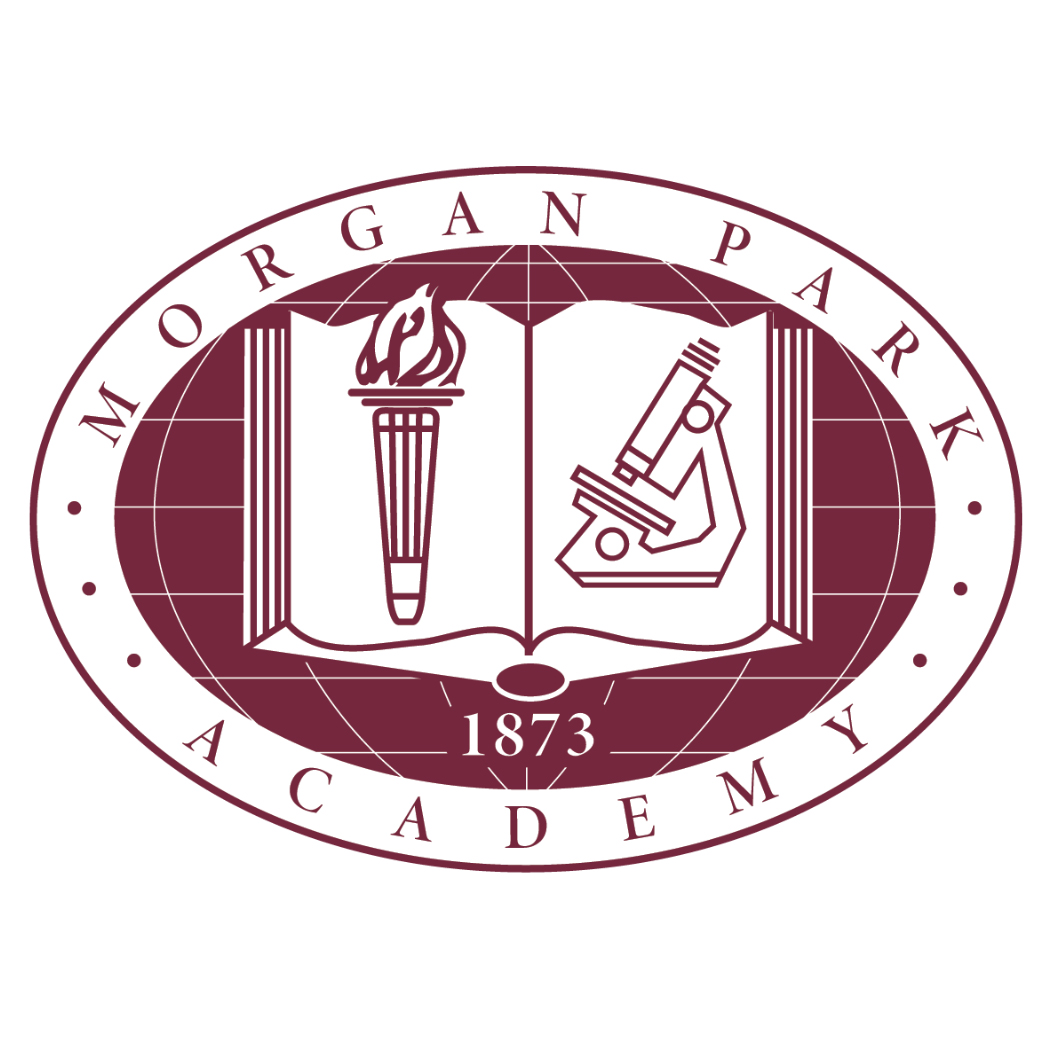

Location
- 2153 W. 111th Street; Chicago, Illinois 60643; United States; 41.69038°N 87.67574°W

Information
- Motto: Independent Thinkers, Global Leaders
- Founded: 1873; 153 years ago
- Head of school: Dr. Phyllis Cavallone-Jurek
- Staff: 70
- Faculty: 55
- Gender: coed
- Age: Pre-K to Grade 12
- Enrollment: 430
- Student to teacher ratio: 8:1
- Campus size: 20 acres
- Houses: Blake, Malcolm, Norton, Theodore, Withington
- Colors: maroon ivory
- Athletics conference: Lake Shore Athletic League
- Mascot: Warriors
- Tuition: US$6,650–$23,500
- Affiliation: National Association of Independent Schools
- Website: http://www.morganparkacademy.org

Morgan Park Academy (MPA) is a coeducational, college preparatory, independent day school serving pre-kindergarten through 12th grade. It is located in the Morgan Park neighborhood on the south side of Chicago, Illinois. Founded in 1873, Morgan Park Academy was formerly known as Mt. Vernon Military Academy, Morgan Park Military Academy (MPMA), briefly as the Illinois Military Academy, and Morgan Park Academy of the University of Chicago. Between 1892 and 1906 MPA had a very close connection with the University of Chicago, with its graduates being specifically groomed to enter the recently founded university.

== History ==
The school was founded as Mt. Vernon Military and Classical Academy in 1873 as a "proprietary school" owned by the headmaster, and run as a for-profit institution. Students paid for room and board, as well as for education, uniforms, and maintenance.

While the school was renamed Morgan Park Military Academy in 1877, the school was briefly (1890–92) incorporated as the Illinois Military Academy.

In 1892, William Rainey Harper, acting as the first president of the University of Chicago, joined the recently formed Owen Academy to the school. The academy's land was purchased, and all operations were moved there, renaming the school "Morgan Park Academy of the University of Chicago", where students were to be specifically prepared for entrance into the new university. At this time, the school was integrated, made non-sectarian, and was made co-ed.

Teachers at the school were considered a part of the University of Chicago faculty, instead of being considered separate. Among the faculty was the school's football coach, Amos Alonzo Stagg, who also coached at the university.

In 1906, the University of Chicago ended its relationship with the school. The school reverted to an all-male military school.

During the Great Depression the school expanded, creating a junior college, and extending summer classes to students from nearby public and parochial schools.

In 1958, the school ended its time as a military school, finally becoming Morgan Park Academy. Girls were readmitted in 1959, and the boarding aspect of the school was phased out over ten years.

== Academics ==
The Lower School runs from pre-kindergarten through grade 5. The curriculum emphasizes problem-solving and higher-order thinking rather than rote learning and drill. Students are involved in at least one major dramatic performance per year. Computers are used in the classroom and students develop technology skills in regular lab classes.

The Middle School includes grades 6 through 8. It emphasizes independent learning, and offers a foundation in English, mathematics, science, music, drama, art, physical education, social studies, world languages and technology. At this level, the faculty work with students to teach them to organize learning and absorb information into a meaningful whole that supports independent learning. Each Middle School student has a faculty advisor with whom they meet in a small group and individually to discuss academic, social and personal concerns. The purpose of the advisor group is to strengthen the student's role within the Academy community by allowing advisees the opportunity to make personal connections, develop a group affiliation, and build their academic and interpersonal skills within the group. Co-curricular opportunities include cultural immersion trips that supplement the Spanish and French programs, spring trips with their class, sports activities (soccer, basketball, softball, baseball, volleyball) and a variety of clubs (Math, Science, French, Spanish, Geography and Chess). Middle School students also have the opportunity to be involved in the Leadership Council that plans and organizes service and social activities for the school year.

The Upper School, which encompasses Grades 9 through 12, completes the program of college preparation. As students transition from the Middle to the Upper School, learning continues to be authentic and engaging with curriculum offerings at three levels: college preparatory, honors, and advanced placement. The Upper School program provides athletic, artistic and leadership opportunities. It fields a variety of athletic teams; provides opportunities in the performing arts, including band, chorus and theater productions; and offers numerous co-curricular offerings to develop leadership ability. Students compete in divisional, regional, and statewide academic and athletic competitions, including previous recognition in the Worldwide Youth in Science and Engineering (WYSE) and Rube Goldberg contests. The school offers 13 Advanced Placement courses.

== Athletics ==
The school fields interscholastic teams for Upper School and Middle School students in baseball, boys basketball, girls basketball, cross country, boys soccer, girls soccer, and girls volleyball. Upper School boys and girls can also compete on varsity tennis teams.

Known as the Warriors, the school's junior varsity and varsity teams compete interscholastically as members of the Independent School League, which comprises independent private schools in the Chicago area. The school also competes in state championship tournaments sponsored by the Illinois High School Association (IHSA).

The following teams finished in the top four of their respective state tournaments sponsored by the IHSA.

- Golf (boys): 4th place (1955–56)
- Soccer (boys): 4th place (2006–07)
- Track & Field (boys): 4th place (1915–16)

While the school no longer sponsors football, in its early days Morgan Park Academy produced several notable football teams. Amos Alonzo Stagg, the coach at the University of Chicago, coached the school's football team for a time. On November 23, 1901, the school became the first Illinois school to travel outside the border states to play a football game, playing University High School of Cleveland to a 0–0 tie. Three alumni are members of the College Football Hall of Fame (two as coaches, one as a player).

== Notable alumni ==
- Albert Benbrook, two-time All-American (1909–10) guard for the University of Michigan; elected to the College Football Hall of Fame in 1971
- Albert E. Bennett, Illinois State Senator and lawyer
- Patrick Bertoletti, internationally known competitive eater
- Ellsworth B. Buck, member of the US House of Representatives from New York (1944–1949)
- Lloyd Burdick (1909–1945), American football player
- Richard M. Chitwood, Texas state legislator from 1921 to 1925; first business manager of Texas Tech University
- Richard L. Duchossois (class of 1940), entrepreneur, Chairman of the Duchossois Group, and owner of Arlington Race Track
- Edward C. Eicher, Congressman (1933–38) and chief justice of the District Court of the United States for the District of Columbia (1942–44); from 1941–42, he was the fifth Chairman of the U.S. Securities and Exchange Commission
- Jason Ervin (Class of 1992), Alderman for Chicago's 28th ward since 2011.
- Jesse Harper (class of 1902), coached Knute Rockne (who would immediately follow him) as head football coach at the University of Notre Dame (1913–17); served as Notre Dame's head basketball coach, and later served as ND's athletic director; elected to the College Football Hall of Fame with fellow alum Ben Benbrook in 1971
- Maestro Harrell (class of 2009), professional singer and actor, best known as Randy Wagstaff on the HBO series The Wire and as young Cassius Clay in the film Ali
- Al Hoffman, Jr. (class of 1952), former United States Ambassador to Portugal, former CEO of WCI Communities
- Arthur W. Hummel, Sr. (class of 1905), Christian missionary to China; served from 1928 to 1954 as the first Chief of the Asian Division of the Library of Congress
- Don A. Moore, Illinois lawyer, judge, and politician
- Paula Newsome (class of 1979), actor best known for television work including Barry (TV series).
- Steven Rosengard (class of 1995), fashion designer; appeared on the popular television series Project Runway
- Matt "Money" Smith (class of 1991), nationally syndicated sports radio personality, co-host of The Petros and Money Show on FOX Sports Radio
- Donald T. Swinarski, Illinois businessman and politician
- Wallace Wade (class of 1913), head baseball and head football coach at the University of Alabama (1923–30), winning three national championships in football; head football coach at Duke University (1931–41, 46–50); Duke's Wallace Wade Stadium is named in his honor; inducted into the College Football Hall of Fame in 1951
- Kareem Daniel, Former Disney executive
- James H. McClure (class of 1935), Summa cum Laude graduate all four years, corporate manufacturing executive and World War II U.S. Army Signal Corps officer who entered Tokyo three days prior to Japan's surrender.
