= Richard M. Chitwood =

American politician (1878–1926)

- Chitwood in 1923

Member of the Texas House of Representatives from the 121st district
- In office January 11, 1921 – January 9, 1923
- Preceded by: John J. Ford
- Succeeded by: Sam A. Bryant

Member of the Texas House of Representatives from the 117th district
- In office January 9, 1923 – August 20, 1925
- Preceded by: Walter F. Jones
- Succeeded by: J. C. Hall

Personal details
- Born: Richard Mortimer Chitwood; February 1, 1878 Alabama, U.S.
- Died: November 21, 1926 (aged 48) Dallas, Texas, U.S.
- Party: Democratic

Richard Mortimer Chitwood (February 1, 1878 – November 21, 1926) was an American politician. He served as a Democratic member for the 117th and 121st district of the Texas House of Representatives.

Born in Alabama, Chitwood attended at the Morgan Park Academy. In 1921, he was elected for the 121st district of the Texas House of Representatives. Chitwood succeeded John J. Ford, and was succeeded by Sam A. Bryant in 1923. In the same year, Chitwood was elected for the 117th district of the Texas House of Representatives, succeeding Walter F. Jones. In 1925, Chitwood left office and there was a special election in January 1926, in which J. C. Hall was elected to finish Chitwood's term for the 117th district.

Chitwood lived in Lubbock, Texas, where he was the business manager at the Texas Tech University. He died in November 1926 of angina in Dallas, Texas, at the age of 48, and was buried in Sweetwater Cemetery.
