= Gmina Sanniki =

Gmina Sanniki Sanniki Commune
- Gmina
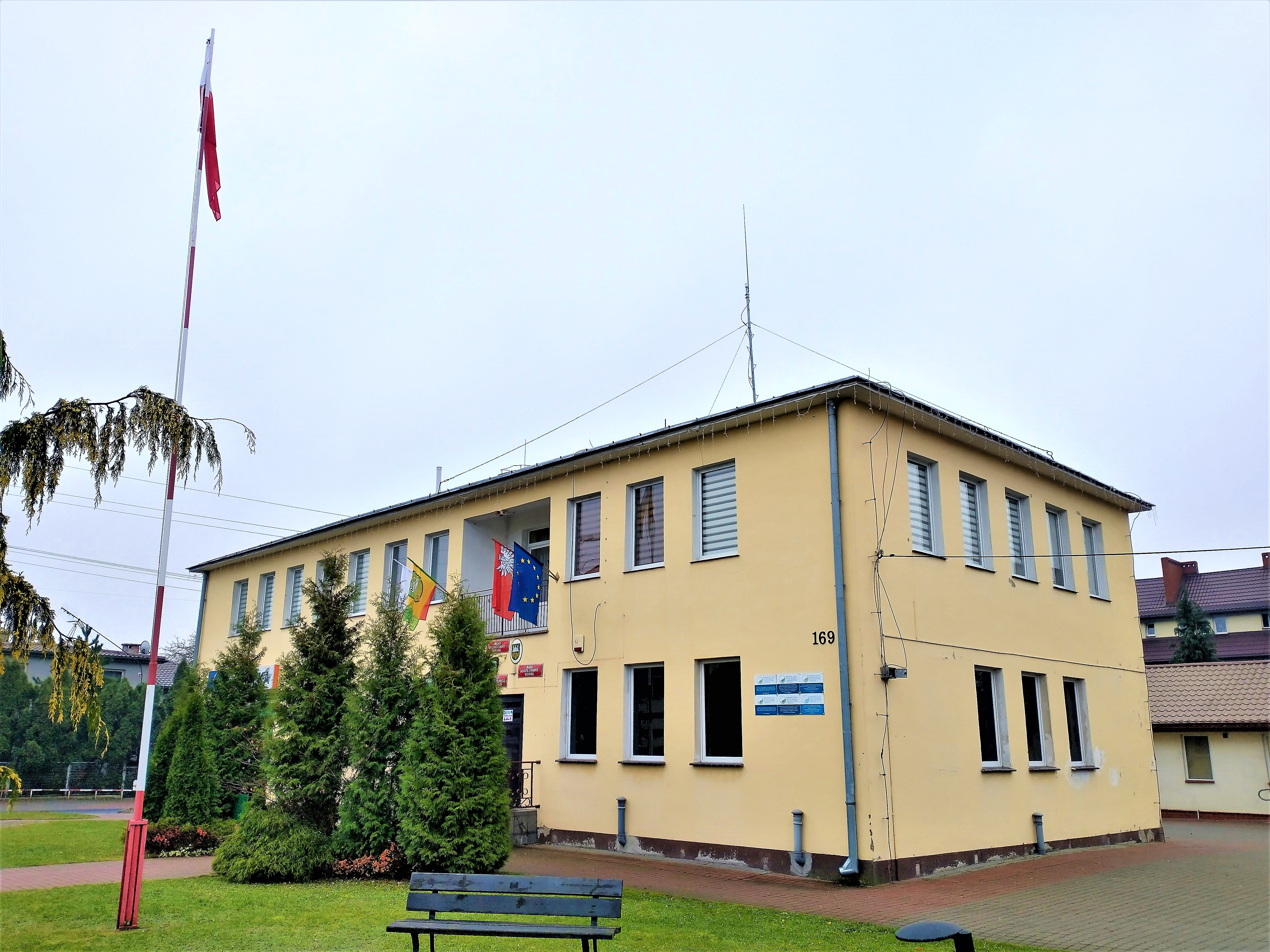

- Flag Coat of arms

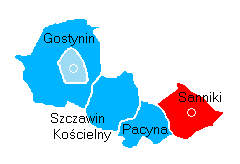
- Location within Gostynin County
- Coordinates (Sanniki): 52°20′2″N 19°51′57″E
- Country: Poland
- Voivodeship: Masovian
- County: Gostynin
- Seat: Sanniki

Area
  - Total: 94.57 km^{2} (36.51 sq mi)

Population (2006)
  - Total: 6,542
  - Density: 69.18/km^{2} (179.2/sq mi)
- Time zone: UTC+1 (CET)
  - Summer (DST): UTC+2 (CEST)
- Vehicle registration: WGS

Gmina Sanniki is an urban-rural gmina (administrative district) in Gostynin County, Masovian Voivodeship, in central Poland. Its seat is the town of Sanniki, which lies approximately 29 kilometres (18 mi) east of Gostynin and 79 km (49 mi) west of Warsaw.

The gmina covers an area of 94.57 square kilometres (36.5 sq mi), and as of 2006 its total population is 6,542.

== Villages ==
Gmina Sanniki contains the town of Sanniki, and the villages and settlements of Aleksandrów, Brzezia, Brzeziny, Czyżew, Działy, Krubin, Lasek, Lubików, Lwówek, Mocarzewo, Nowy Barcik, Osmolin, Osmólsk Górny, Sielce, Staropol, Stary Barcik, Szkarada, Wólka Niska and Wólka Wysoka.

== Neighbouring gminas ==
Gmina Sanniki is bordered by the gminas of Gąbin, Iłów, Kiernozia, Pacyna and Słubice.
