= Świniarski =

Abdank coat of arms, used by some of Świnairski family

Świniarski (feminine: Świniarska) is a Polish surname, derived from the adjectival form for Świniary (Świnary). Some of them use Abdank coat of arms, Leliwa coat of arms or Poraj coat of arms. It may be transliterated as: Swiniarski, Swiniarska, Swinairsky, Sviniarski, Sviniairska, Sviniarsky, Schwiniarski, Schwiniarsky. Notable people with the surname include:

- Barbara Krzyżanowska-Świniarska (1941–2015), Polish internal medicine physician
- Józef Świniarski (1932–2018), Polish engineer
- Michał Świniarski (1740–1793), Polish journalist and lawyer
- Ryszard Świniarski (1948), Polish athlete
- Steven Swiniarski pen name S. Andrew Swann, American science fiction and fantasy author
- Tadeusz Świniarski (1917–2007), Polish athlete
- Zdzisław Świniarski (1966) – Lieutenant Colonel of Polish Army, engineer

== See also ==
- Świnarski
