= Gmina Solec-Zdrój =

Gmina Solec-Zdrój Solec-Zdrój Commune
- Gmina
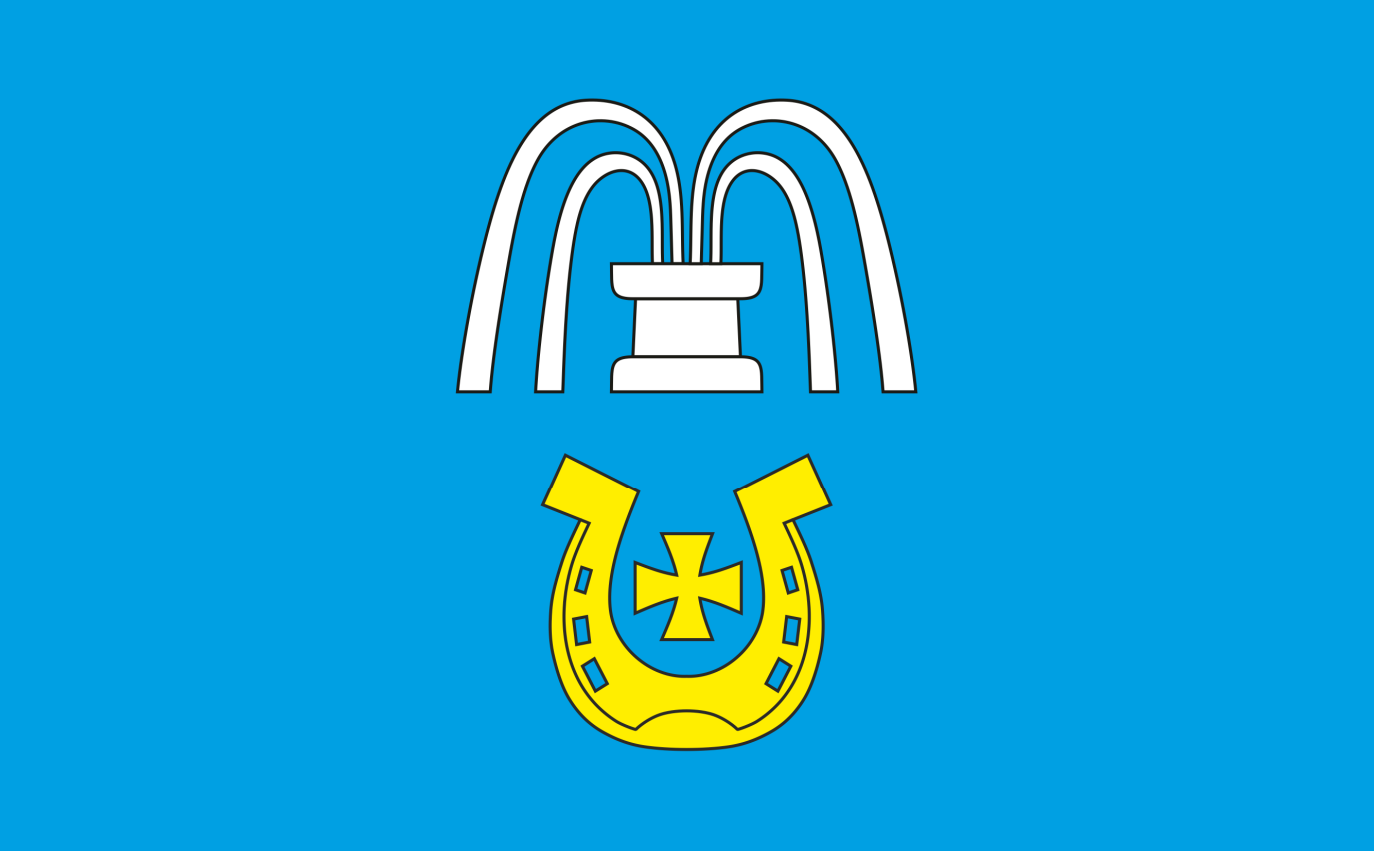
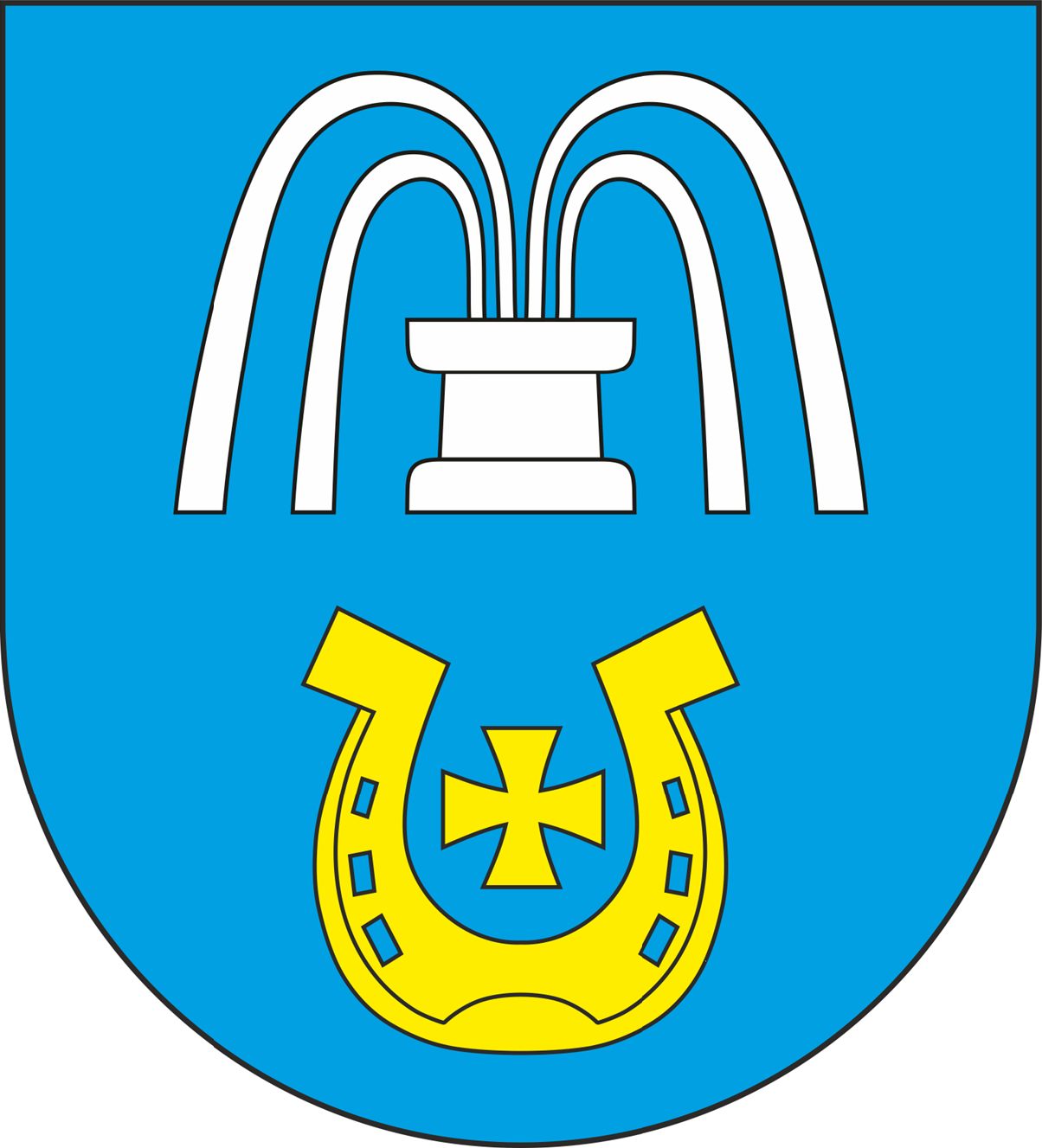
- Flag Coat of arms
- Interactive map of Gmina Solec-Zdrój
- Coordinates (Solec-Zdrój): 50°21′59″N 20°53′13″E
- Country: Poland
- Voivodeship: Świętokrzyskie
- County: Busko
- Seat: Solec-Zdrój

Area
  - Total: 84.9 km^{2} (32.8 sq mi)

Population (2006)
  - Total: 4,987
  - Density: 58.7/km^{2} (152/sq mi)
- Website: http://www.solec-zdroj.pl

Gmina Solec-Zdrój is a rural gmina (administrative district) in Busko County, Świętokrzyskie Voivodeship, in south-central Poland. Its seat is the village of Solec-Zdrój, which lies approximately 17 kilometres (11 mi) south-east of Busko-Zdrój and 61 km (38 mi) south of the regional capital Kielce.

The gmina covers an area of 84.9 square kilometres (32.8 sq mi), and as of 2006 its total population is 4,987.

The gmina contains part of the protected area called Szaniec Landscape Park.

== Villages ==
Gmina Solec-Zdrój contains the villages and settlements of Chinków, Kików, Ludwinów, Magierów, Piasek Mały, Piestrzec, Solec-Zdrój, Strażnik, Sułkowice, Świniary, Wełnin, Włosnowice, Zagaje Kikowskie, Zagajów, Zagajów-Kolonia, Zagórzany, Zborów, Zielonki and Żuków.

== Neighbouring gminas ==
Gmina Solec-Zdrój is bordered by the gminas of Busko-Zdrój, Nowy Korczyn, Pacanów and Stopnica.
