= Lubików =

- Village
- Location within Poland
- Coordinates: 52°17′58″N 19°47′44″E
- Country: Poland
- Voivodeship: Masovian
- County: Gostynin
- Gmina: Sanniki
- Time zone: UTC+1 (CET)
  - Summer (DST): UTC+2 (CEST)
- Vehicle registration: WGS

Lubików [luˈbikuf] is a village in the administrative district of Gmina Sanniki, within Gostynin County, Masovian Voivodeship, in central Poland. As of 2011, Lubików had a population of 120 people, of which 47.5% were women and 52.5% were men.
