= Lwówek, Masovian Voivodeship =

Lwówek
- Village
- Location within Poland
- Coordinates: 52°20′27″N 19°46′27″E
- Country: Poland
- Voivodeship: Masovian
- County: Gostynin
- Gmina: Sanniki
- Population: 450
- Time zone: UTC+1 (CET)
  - Summer (DST): UTC+2 (CEST)
- Vehicle registration: WGS

Lwówek [ˈlvuvɛk] is a village in the administrative district of Gmina Sanniki, within Gostynin County, Masovian Voivodeship, in central Poland.
