= Sułkowice, Świętokrzyskie Voivodeship =

Sułkowice
- Village
- Location within Poland
- Coordinates: 50°25′30″N 20°50′24″E
- Country: Poland
- Voivodeship: Świętokrzyskie
- County: Busko
- Gmina: Solec-Zdrój

Sułkowice [suu̯kɔˈvit͡sɛ] is a village in the administrative district of Gmina Solec-Zdrój, within Busko County, Świętokrzyskie Voivodeship, in south-central Poland. It lies approximately 8 km (5 mi) north-west of Solec-Zdrój, 10 km (6 mi) south-east of Busko-Zdrój, and 54 km (34 mi) south of the regional capital Kielce.
