= Sanniki, Masovian Voivodeship =

Sanniki
- Town
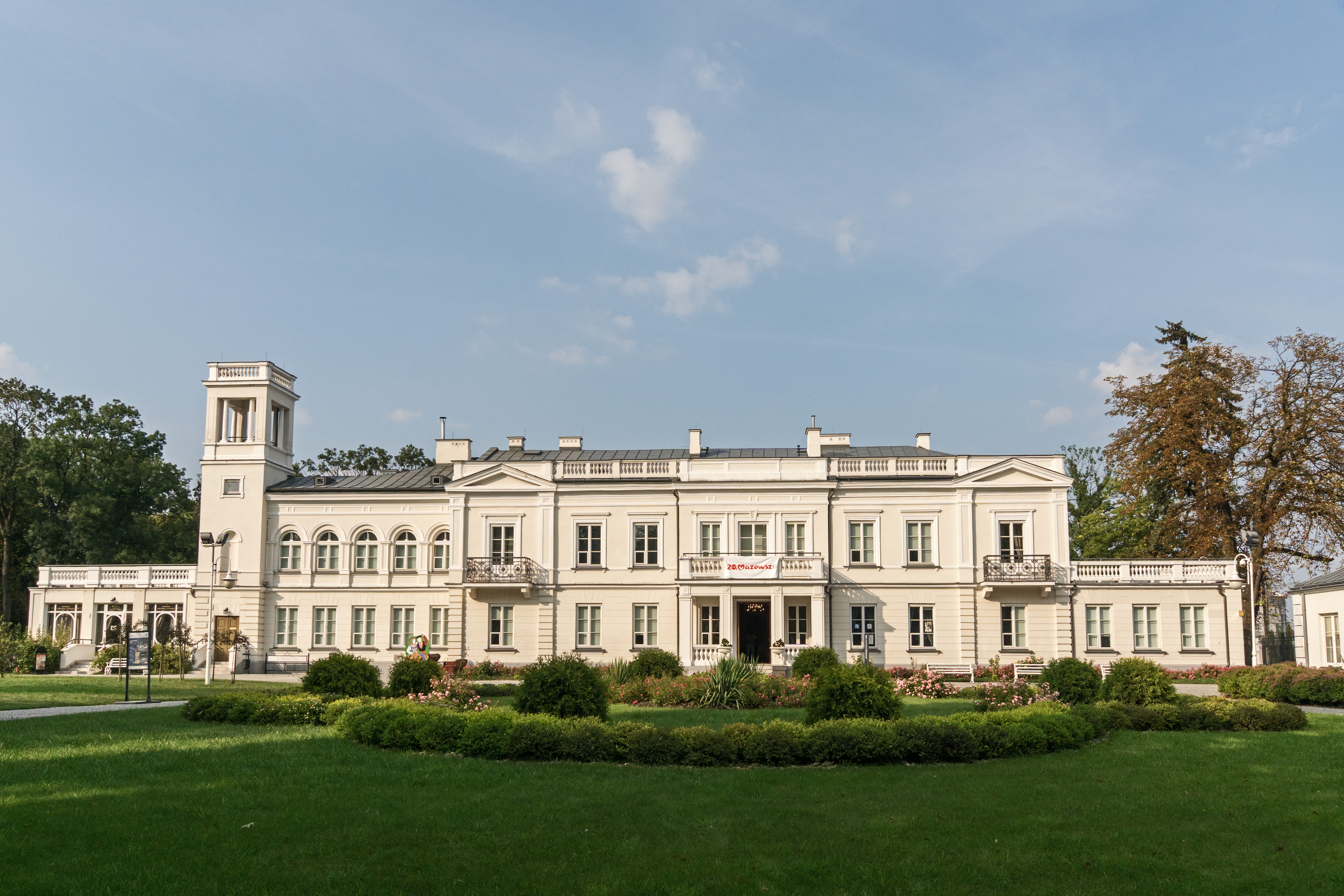
- Fryderyk Chopin Palace and Park, Sanniki

- Coat of arms

- Location within Poland
- Coordinates: 52°20′2″N 19°51′57″E
- Country: Poland
- Voivodeship: Masovian
- County: Gostynin
- Gmina: Sanniki
- Population: 2,000
- Time zone: UTC+1 (CET)
  - Summer (DST): UTC+2 (CEST)
- Vehicle registration: WGS

Sanniki [sanˈniki] is a town in Gostynin County, Masovian Voivodeship, in central Poland. It is the seat of the gmina (administrative district) called Gmina Sanniki.

The town has a population of 2,000.

== History ==
Fryderyk Chopin, then 18, vacationed here in 1828. In 1849 a sugar factory was built in Sanniki, and then it was enlarged in 1854 and 1859, and modernized in 1877 and 1880.

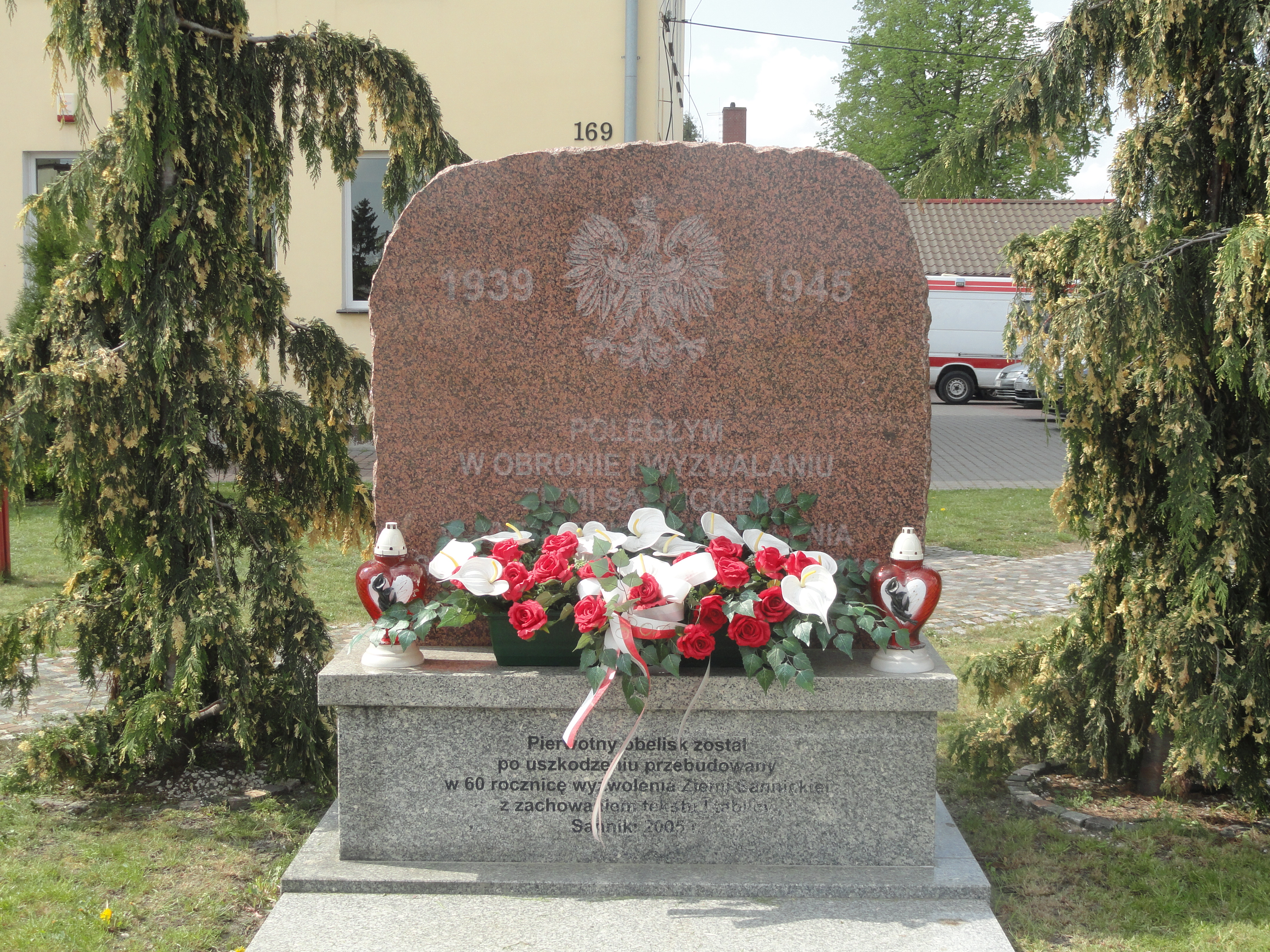
Monument to those who died defending and liberating the Sanniki region during World War II

Before World War II, the town had a Jewish community of 300 or so. During the German occupation of Poland, the Jews were forced to live in a small ghetto. In 1940, the German gendermerie and SS carried out expulsions of local Poles, who were sent to a transit camp in Kutno and then deported to forced labour in Germany. In 1941, the Jews were forced to demolish a local church so Germans could photograph it for their antisemitic propaganda. In early 1942, the 250 Jews left in the ghetto were deported to the Chełmno extermination camp to be murdered. The number of Sanniki Jews who survived is unknown. From 1943 to 1945, the town was renamed by the German occupiers to Sannikau.

== Transport ==
Sanniki lies on the intersection of voivodeship roads 584, 583 and 577.

The nearest railway station is in Gostynin to the west.
