= Brzeziny, Gostynin County =

Brzeziny
- Village
- Location within Poland
- Coordinates: 52°19′16″N 19°57′18″E
- Country: Poland
- Voivodeship: Masovian
- County: Gostynin
- Gmina: Sanniki
- Time zone: UTC+1 (CET)
  - Summer (DST): UTC+2 (CEST)
- Vehicle registration: WGS

Brzeziny [bʐɛˈʑinɨ] is a village in the administrative district of Gmina Sanniki, within Gostynin County, Masovian Voivodeship, in central Poland.
