= Poraj coat of arms =

Polish coat of arms

Poraj
- Battle cry: Poraj
- Alternative name(s): Rosa, Rosa Alba, Róża, Różyc, Stoice, Una Rosa
- Earliest mention: 10th century
- Cities: Fordon, Września, Zagórów, Dobiegniew, Barcin, Nowe Miasto Lubawskie
- Divisions: Gmina Września, Gmina Zagórów, Namysłów County
- Families: 342 names

Poraj is a Polish Coat of Arms. Used by several knighthood families of medieval Poland and noble families of the Polish–Lithuanian Commonwealth - those descended in the male-line from the Poraj family and those allowed into the heraldic clan by adoption.

== History ==
The Poraj coat of arms is of Bohemian origin. The name comes from the progenitor of the Polish clan Prince Poraj (Pořej), brother of Adalbert of Prague, son of the Bohemian Duke Slavník. According to a legend the sons of Duke Slavník bore the coat of arms of roses, each in a different color.

Prince Poraj came to Poland with the procession of Dobrawa of Bohemia, the spouse of Mieszko I of Poland and settled down in Greater Poland.

== Blazon ==
Gules, a rose Argent barbed Vert seeded Or.

== Families ==
=== A ===
Alantowicz, Ambroziewicz, Antoszewski, Augustynowicz

=== B ===
Badowski, Belimin, Bernacki, Biernacki, Bierzgliński, Bilimin, Bilimowicz, Biling, Birgiałło, Blęcki, Bodzanta, Boguchwał, Bortkiewicz, Borysowicz, Boryszewski, Boryszowski, Buczeński, Bukowski, Bużeński

=== C ===
Cecundus, Chlebowski, Chmielicki, Chodcza, Chodubski, Chomętowski, Chomiński, Chotecki, Chrapowicki, Chrapowski, Chraszczewski, Chraszewski, Chrzanowski, Chrząnowski, Chrzonowski, Czado, Czadowski, Czapikowski, Czasławski, Czesławski, Czestek, Czostkowski

=== D ===
Dąbrowski, Dembowiecki, Dębnicki, Dobrosołowski, Dobrosułowski, Dobrzelewski, Dobrzelowski, Dobrzyński, Dominikowski, Druktejn, Dulski, Dworzysowski, Dworzyszowski

=== E ===
Egersdorff, Egiersdorf, Egierszdorff

=== F ===
Faruchowicz

=== G ===
Gadamowicz, Galicki, Garkowski, Garliniński, Garliński, Garmuchowski, Garnisz, Garnkowski, Garnuchowski, Gazuba, Gedrojc, Gidzielski, Głuch, Gniewiecki, Goczałkowski, Golemowski, Gołembowski, Gołębowski, Gołuński, Gorecki, Goryński, Gorzyński, Górecki, Górski, Górzeński, Grejcz, Grochowicki, Grodecki, Grusznicki, Gruszczyński, Grzybowski

=== H ===
Halicki, Hickiewicz, Hollak

=== I ===
Imieliński, Iskrzycki, Iwanowski, Izbieński, Izkrzycki

=== J ===
Jaka, Jakimowski, Jakka, Jaktorowski, Jakubowski, Jamiołowski, Jankowski, Jaroskowski, Jaroszkowski, Jasieński, Jaszeński, Jelec, Jemielski, Jemiołowski, Jeżewski, Jeżowski, Jozefkowicz, Jurach, Juracha, Jurowski

=== K ===
Kadłubek, Kalski, Kandzierzawski, Kantaroski, Karczowski, Karsza, Karszewski, Karsznicki, Karśnicki, Karterla, Kaszliński, Kaszuba, Kaszyński, Katerla, Kęsowski, Kobielski, Kodrembski, Kodrębski, Kodrępski, Konarzewski, Kontelli, Kopeć, Korbecki, Korotkiewicz, Koszyc, Kościerski, Kośmiderski, Kotkowski, Koźmiński, Krępski, Królikowski, Krulikowski, Krzepicki, Kuczewski, Kuczowski, Kuncewicz, Kuniewicz, Kuniński, Kuparewicz, Kupcewicz, Kurozwęcki, Kurzewski

=== L ===
Lalewicz, Latkowski, Legaczyński, Lipnicki, Litwicki, Lodorowski, Lściński, Lubelczyk

=== Ł ===
Łagiewnicki, Łatkowski, Łątkowski, Łyszkowski

=== M ===
Madejski, Madeyski, Majaczewski, Majaczowski, Malina, Małyński, Marzelewski, Męciński, Męczyński, Michałowski, Mickiewicz, Mieciecki, Miezewicz, Migdał, Mikorski, Miłoszowski, Mirucki, Mniszek, Mojaczewski, Motkowski, Muławski

=== N ===
Narbutowicz, Nidomski, Niechmierowski, Niechmirowski, Nieciecki, Niekmierowski, Nienadkiewicz, Niesiecki, Nieznański, Nowicki, Nyra, Nyrtowt

=== O ===
Ochoński, Ordychowski, Paciorek, Paczorek

=== P ===
Paluszycki, Pałuski, Pałuszycki, Pampicki, Pantoszewski, Pauszycki, Pawszycki, Pągowski, Perepeliński, Pępecki, Pępicki, Piorunowski, Piotrasz, Piroski, Płaskowicki, Płaskowiecki, Płaszkiewicz, Podleski, Podlewski, Podłęski, Pojodziewicz, Poleski, Poraj, Porajewski, Porajowski, Porajski, Porzeziński, Prązewski, Prążewski, Prążowski, Przedborowski, Przedwojewski, Przepiórkowski, Przyłubski, Przyrański, Pstrokoński, Pstrowski, Pułaski, Puławski

=== R ===
Raczkowski, Radziński, Rogaczowski, Roginicki, Rosen, Rozemberg, Rożański, Rożecki, Rożęcki, Róża, Różański, Różęcki, Różyc, Różycki, Ruczewski, Ruczowski, Rusiecki, Rymgłaj

=== S ===
Samproch, Setbeg, Siekierski, Siestrzewitowski, Skotnicki, Skrzetuszewski, Skwaroszewski, Skwiroszewski, Sobiekórski, Sobiekurski, Sobiesierski, Solnica, Solski, Sromocki, Stanclewicz, Stanclewski, Suchecki, Suchocki, Sulski, Swinarski, Swiżyński, Szatkowski, Szczerbicz, Szewczycki, Szuliński, Szychucki, Świerzyński, Świnarski, Świniarski, Świrzyński, Świżyński

=== T ===
Tłoszkiewicz, Tomuski, Tryniszewski, Trzebiński, Tyniecki

=== W ===
Wawrzecki, Wazenberg, Wągrzycki, Werner, Weyss, Weyzenberg, Węgrzycki, Wielewiejski, Wielowiejski, Wienskowski, Wieszczycierowski, Wieszczyciorowski, Wilczek, Wilczyński, Wilkowski, Winowski, Witkowski, Wodzianowski, Wodzijowski, Wodzinowski, Wodzyński, Wojtkuński, Wrzesieński, Wybranowski, Wydrychiewicz

=== Z ===
Zakrzeński, Zakrzyński, Zaksiński, Zakszeński, Zakszyński, Zaliński, Zamojski, Zamoyski, Zawadyński, Zbłotnicki, Zbrożek, Zdzarowski, Zdzęnicki, Złobnicki, Zwanowski, Zyrnicki

=== Ż ===
Żdżarowski, Żłobnicki, Żołądziowski, Żołędziowski

== Notable bearers ==
- Jan Gruszczyński, Primate of Poland and Viceroy
- Jan Bodzanta, Bishop of Kraków
- Bogufał I, Bishop of Poznań
- Bogufał II, Bishop of Poznań
- Bogufał III z Czerlina, Bishop of Poznań
- Benedykt Izdbieński, Bishop of Poznań
- Franciszek Antoni Kobielski, Bishop of Lutsk
- Maciej Garnysz, Bishop of Chełmno
- Stanisław Pstrokoński, Bishop of Chełmno
- Piotr Goryński, Voivode of the Duchy of Masovia
- Jan Samuel Chrzanowski, lieutenant colonel
- Adam Mickiewicz, national poet, see: Three Bards
- Wincenty Kadłubek, Bishop of Kraków and chronicler
- Roman Grodecki, professor at the Jagiellonian University
- House of Kurozwęcki
  - Krzesław Kurozwęcki, Grand Chancellor of the Crown and Bishop of Kujawy
  - Dobiesław Kurozwęcki, Voivode of Krakow
  - Stanisław Kurozwęcki, Vice-Chancellor of the Crown
  - Zawisza Kurozwęcki, regent of the Kingdom of Poland
  - Dobiesław "Lubelczyk" Kurozwęcki, Voivode of Lublin
  - Mikołaj "Lubelczyk" Kurozwęcki, Voivode of Lublin
  - Krzesław Kurozwęcki, castellan of Nowy Sacz
  - Piotr Kurozwęcki, Court Marshal of the Crown
  - Krzesław "Półtorabek" Kurozwęcki, starost of Krakow
  - Adam Kurozwęcki, starost of Brzeziny
- Janusz Zakrzeński, film and theatrical actor
- Stanislaw Chlebowski, painter
- Józef Biernacki, general, participant of the Kosciuszko and November Uprisings
- Alojzy Prosper Biernacki, Chancellor of the Exchequer during the November Uprising
- Andrzej Boryszewski, Archbishop of Lwów, Primate of Poland
- Mikołaj Róża Borzyszowski, Crown Master of the Kitchen, castellan of Małogoszcz
- Hieronim Bużeński, Grand Treasurer of the Crown
- Antoni Madeyski, sculptor
- Andrzej Madeysk, engineer, associate professor
- Jerzy Madeyski, art historian
- Adam Gruszczyński, judge, castellan of Gniezno
- Włodzimierz Gruszczyński, architect and professor
- Wojciech Męciński (Alberto Polacco), Jesuit, missionary in Japan
- Wojciech Męciński, general of the Army of the Duchy of Warsaw
- Cezar Męciński, officer of the Polish Army
- Cezary Chlebowski, writer and historian
- Wincenty Wiszniewski, astronomer
- Józef Kuczewski, judge and wójt of Wiłkomierz, member of the Grodno Sejm
- Stanisław Wybranowski, Standard-Bearer of Lublin
- Stanisław Goczałkowski, Burgrave of Krakow
- Jan Chlebowski, Royal Rotmistrz in the times of John II Casimir Vasa
- Tadeusz Holak, professor of Biochemistry

== Variations ==
Biegaczewicz (odm.)

Karczewski (odm.)

Królikowski (odm.)

Krzepicki (odm.)

Pażątka (odm.)

== Gallery ==
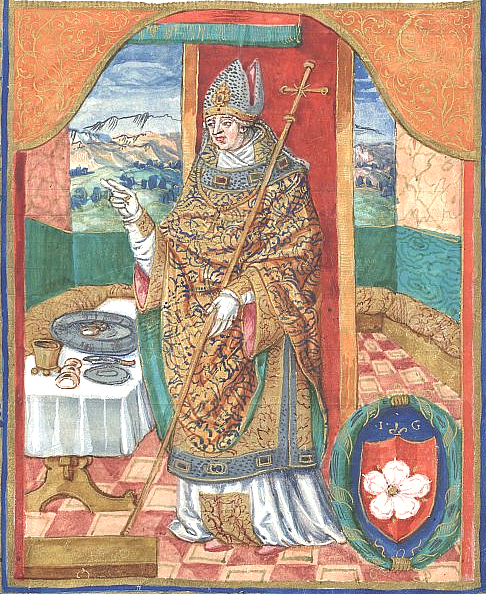
Poraj on a painting of Jan Gruszczyński

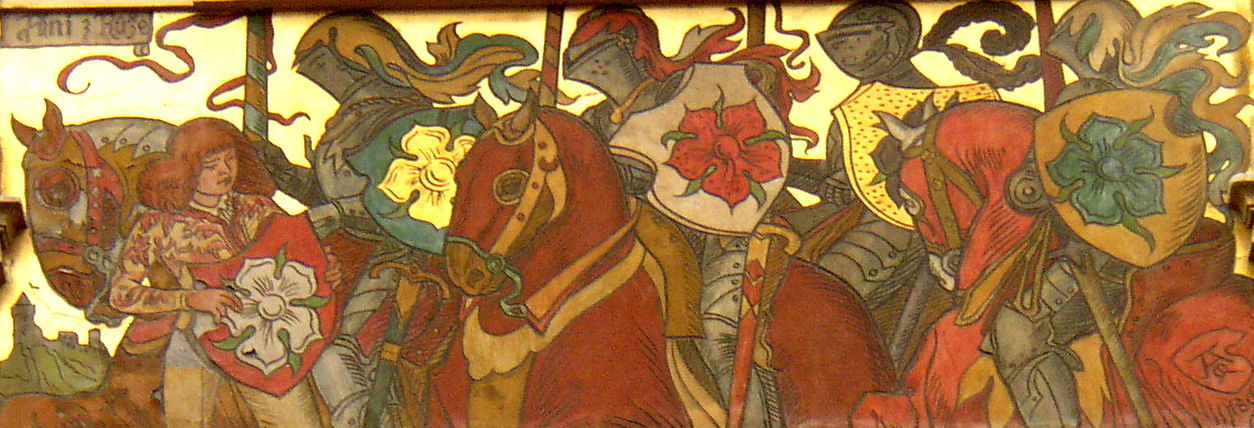
Lords of the Rose, mural by Mikoláš Aleš, 1896

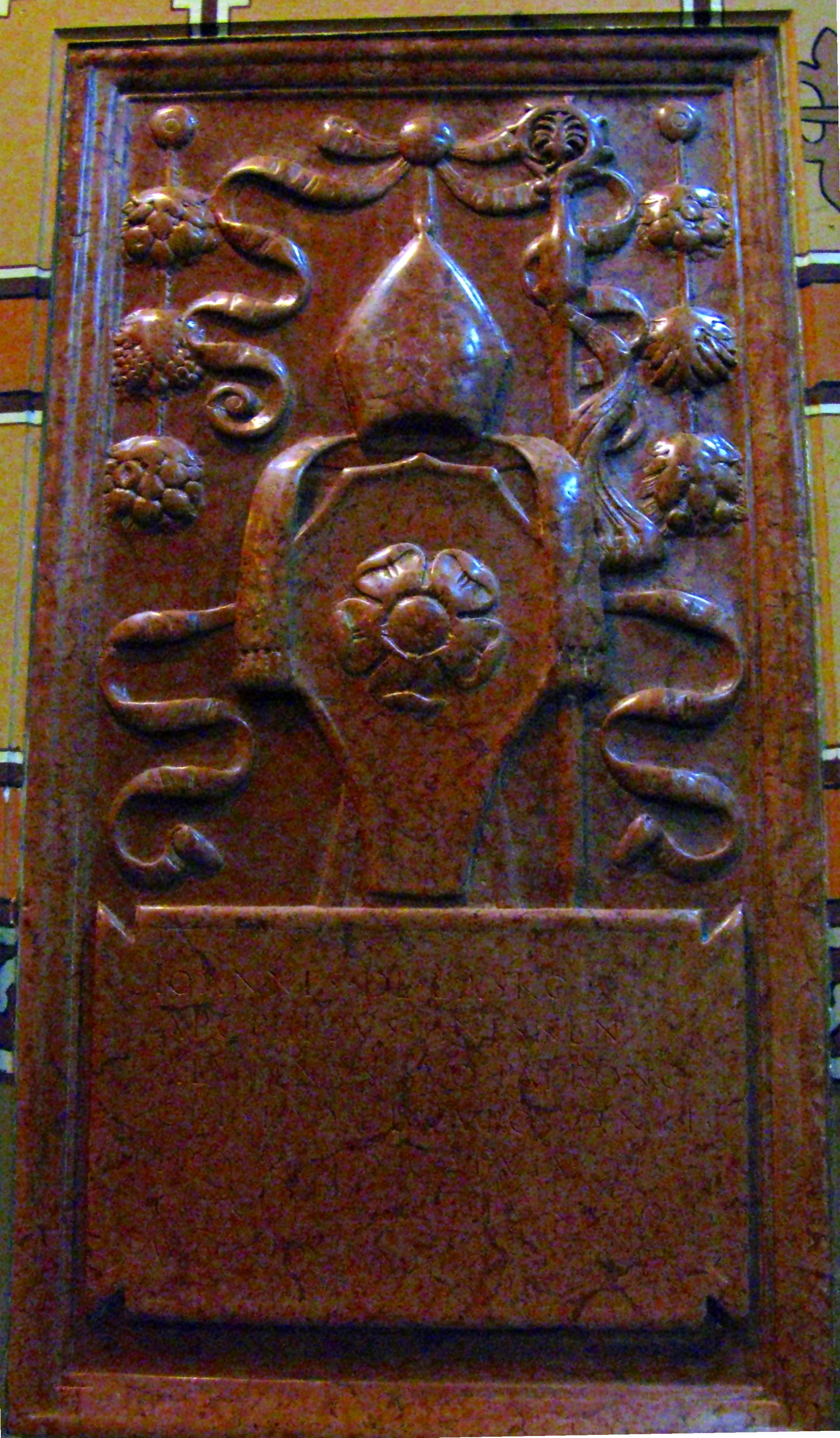
Krzesław Kurozwęcki epitaph in Włocławek Cathedral

== See also ==
- Polish heraldry
- Heraldic family
- List of Polish nobility coats of arms

== Bibliography ==
- Bartosz Paprocki: Herby rycerstwa polskiego, Kraków, 1858
- Tadeusz Gajl: Herbarz polski od średniowiecza do XX wieku : ponad 4500 herbów szlacheckich 37 tysięcy nazwisk 55 tysięcy rodów. L&L, 2007.ISBN 978-83-60597-10-1
