= Świniary, Świętokrzyskie Voivodeship =

Świniary
- Village
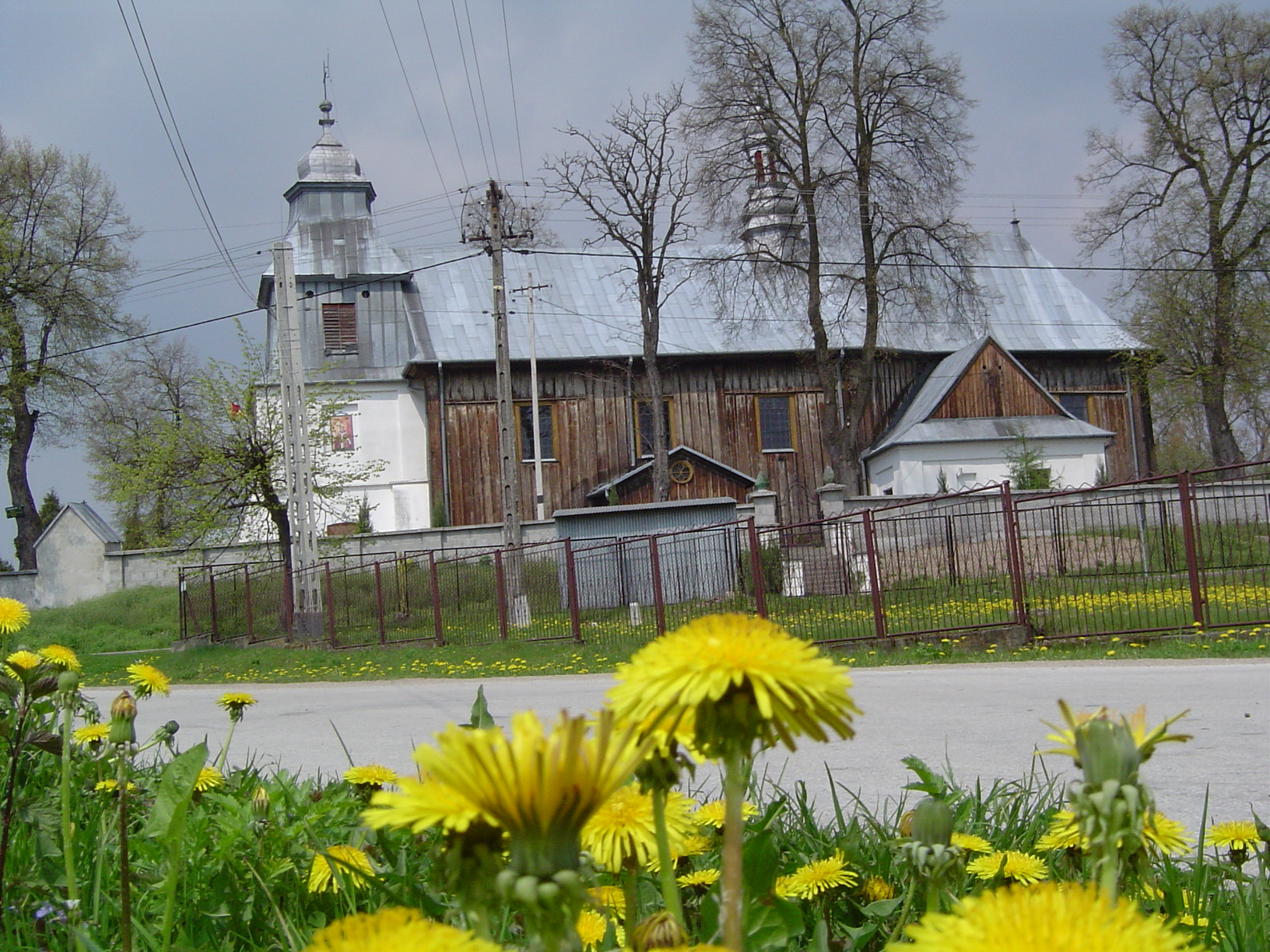
- Catholic church

- Location within Poland
- Coordinates: 50°21′21″N 20°56′47″E
- Country: Poland
- Voivodeship: Świętokrzyskie
- County: Busko
- Gmina: Solec-Zdrój
- Population: 351
- Website: http://www.swiniary.republika.pl/

Świniary [ɕfiˈɲarɨ] is a village in the administrative district of Gmina Solec-Zdrój, within Busko County, Świętokrzyskie Voivodeship, in south-central Poland. It lies approximately 5 km (3 mi) east of Solec-Zdrój, 21 km (13 mi) south-east of Busko-Zdrój, and 63 km (39 mi) south of the regional capital Kielce.
