= Zawisza Kurozwęcki =

Polish regent of the Kingdom of Poland, Roman Catholic bishop and politician

Poraj coat of arms

Zawisza Kurozwęcki, Zawisza z Kurozwęk (Polish: Zawisza of Kurozwęki; ?–12 January 1382), of Clan Poraj, was a Polish regent of the Kingdom of Poland, Roman Catholic bishop of Kraków, Chancellor of the Crown (kanclerz koronny) and Deputy Chancellor of the Crown (podkanclerzy koronny) of the Kingdom of Poland, prominent politician.

== Biography ==
Date and place of birth of Zawisza remain unknown.

In the years of 1352–1353 Zawisza was a canon of Sandomierz, 1353–1380 canon of Kraków and since 1366 archdeacon of Kraków. Since 1380 or since 1381 (sources vary) bishop of Kraków. In the years of 1371–1373 Zawisza was a Deputy Chancellor of the Crown and in the years of 1374–1380 Chancellor of the Crown of the Kingdom of Poland. In 1381 Zawisza became a Vicarius regni poloniae.

He died on 12 January 1382 in Dobrowoda, Świętokrzyskie Voivodeship, Poland.

== Family ==
- Dobiesław Kurozwęcki (?–1397) – father; castellan, politician
- Krzesław Kurozwęcki (?–1392) – brother; nobility
