= Zagajów, Busko County =

Zagajów
- Village
- Location within Poland
- Coordinates: 50°21′39″N 20°49′55″E
- Country: Poland
- Voivodeship: Świętokrzyskie
- County: Busko
- Gmina: Solec-Zdrój

Zagajów [zaˈɡajuf] is a village in the administrative district of Gmina Solec-Zdrój, within Busko County, Świętokrzyskie Voivodeship, in south-central Poland. It lies approximately 4 km (2 mi) west of Solec-Zdrój, 15 km (9 mi) south-east of Busko-Zdrój, and 60 km (37 mi) south of the regional capital Kielce.
