= Aleksandrów, Gostynin County =

Aleksandrów
- Village
- Location within Poland
- Coordinates: 52°20′3″N 19°49′45″E
- Country: Poland
- Voivodeship: Masovian
- County: Gostynin
- Gmina: Sanniki
- Time zone: UTC+1 (CET)
  - Summer (DST): UTC+2 (CEST)
- Vehicle registration: WGS

Aleksandrów [alɛkˈsandruf] is a village in the administrative district of Gmina Sanniki, within Gostynin County, Masovian Voivodeship, in central Poland.
