= Zielonki, Busko County =

Zielonki
- Village
- Location within Poland
- Coordinates: 50°21′9″N 20°54′50″E
- Country: Poland
- Voivodeship: Świętokrzyskie
- County: Busko
- Gmina: Solec-Zdrój

Zielonki [ʑɛˈlɔŋki] is a village in the administrative district of Gmina Solec-Zdrój, within Busko County, Świętokrzyskie Voivodeship, in south-central Poland. It lies approximately 3 km (2 mi) south-east of Solec-Zdrój, 19 km (12 mi) south-east of Busko-Zdrój, and 63 km (39 mi) south of the regional capital Kielce.
