= Doliwa coat of arms =

Polish coat of arms

Doliwa
- Battle cry: Doliwa
- Alternative names: Doliwczyk, Doliwita, Tres Rosae
- Earliest mention: 1311
- Towns: Murowana Goślina, Rozdrażew

Doliwa is a Polish coat of arms. It was used by several noble families known as szlachta during the Polish–Lithuanian Commonwealth. The design consists of an azure blue background with a diagonal stripe and three roses.

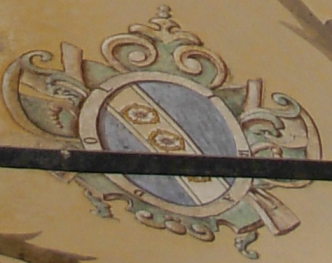
Doliwa coat of arms in Baranow-Sandomierski castle

== Notable bearers ==
Notable bearers of this coat of arms include:

- Mikhail Dolivo-Dobrovolsky (Polish: Michał Doliwo-Dobrowolski) – engineer and inventor
- Jan Lutek, medieval bishop

== Families ==
Tadeusz Gajl in his Herbarz Polski od Średniowiecza do XX wieku (Polish Armorial from the Middle Ages to the 20th Century) lists the following families entitled to the Doliwa coat of arms:

Alchinowicz, Alkimowicz, Androszewicz, Andruchowicz, Andruszewicz,

Babicki, Babiłło, Badowski, Balcerowicz, Bartodziejski, Baruchowski, Bereżyński, Biechowski, Bieniądzki, Bieniecki, Błotnicki, Bobrkowski, Bobrownicki, Bogdański, Bogutko, Borkowski, Borownicki, Bortnowski, Boruchowski, Brykaj, Brzezieński, Brzeziński,

Chanowski, Chebda, Chorzelewski, Ciecholewski, Cielecki, Cieleski, Cielski, Ciemierzyński, Ciemiornicki, Ciski, Czemiernicki, Czemierzyński, Częstkowski, Czindaski, Czyżewski,

Dalidonowicz, Daniewicz, Delinda, Dembiński, Dębiński, Dębski, Dier, Dłużniewski, Dobiejowski, Dobiesz, Dobkiewicz, Dobrot, Dobrowolski, Dobrucki, Doliwa, Drabowicz, Drobot, Drożyński, Duniewicz, Dyczkowski, Dynowski, Dzieczeński, Dzieczyński, Dziektarski, Dziewiński, Dzik, Dzikowicz, Dzikowski, Dziwiński,

Elsner, Elssner,

Falinkowski, Falkowski, Fallois, Falski, Fulewski, Furman,

Gagowski, Gedbut, Gedbutowicz, Getbut, Gezek, Gidwiłło, Giecewicz, Gieczewicz, Giedbut, Giedwiłło, Giedymin, Giedziewicz, Giesek, Ginwiłowicz, Girdwojń, Girdwoyń, Gitter, Gizowski, Gładkowski, Głazejewski, Głazowski, Głażejewski, Głażewski, Głażowski, Głębocki, Głuczowski, Gocki, Godzki, Gojski, Gołgowski, Gołogórski, Gonsecki, Gorski, Gorzuchowski, Gorzycki, Gosławski, Gościński, Goyski, Gozdowski, Gozdzecki, Gozdzicki, Gozdzki, Gozimirski, Goździn, Górski, Grajewski, Graniewski, Grzybowski, Gujski, Guzewski, Guzowski,

Handa, Hilter, Hujsiej, Hurtych, Hurtyg, Hurtyk,

Ilnicki, Iłłakowicz, Iraszewski, Iraszowski, Iruszewicz,

Jakubiński, Jamiołkowski, Janczewski, Jankowski, Janski, Janulewicz, Jański, Jelitko, Jelitowski, Jemiołkowski,

Kadłubicki, Kadłubski, Kempski, Kępski, Khanowski, Kijaszkowski, Klechowski, Kleczkowski, Klepacki, Klichowski, Klikowski, Klimczycki, Kłoczewski, Kłoczowski, Knot, Kobylnicki, Kopacz, Korzeński, Kosiński, Koszczyc, Koszczycz, Koszembar, Kościelecki, Kot, Kowalewski, Kozakowski, Kożuchowski, Krogulecki, Kruszecki,

Langeman, Lipski, Lisiewski, Lisowski, Lubieński, Lubiński, Lubliński, Luboracki, Luboradzki, Ludkiewicz, Lutek, Lutkiewicz, Lutko, Lutogniewski,

Łubieński, Łukaszewicz, Łukomski, Łyskowski, Łyszkowski,

Machwicz, Maciuk, Maczuk, Maraczewski, Marcinkiewicz, Mazowski, Mejnard, Mejnart, Mieszkowski, Miłosławski, Mleczko, Młodziejewski, Młodziejowski, Młotnicki, Montrym, Moraczewski,

Nac, Naczko, Naczkun, Nagiewicz, Naszyniec, Natkiewicz, Natko, Neczko, Niemajewski, Niemojewski, Ninkowski, Noswicki, Noswitz, Noświcki, Nowomiejski,

Ochimowski, Okrąglicki, Olszyński, Omiechowski, Osiecki, Osuchowski,

Pałaszewski, Pałaszowski, Parawa, Parczewski, Pasek, Paszek, Paszkiewicz, Pawłowski, Pępowski, Pieciulewicz, Pilecki, Poddębski, Podgórski, Podleski, Połubiński, Porzecki, Przekuleja, Przestępski, Przykuleja, Przyrownicki, Purzycki,

Radecki, Rakowski, Rozdrażewski, Różycki, Rudziański, Rykalski, Rykowski, Rzeszowski,

Sabliński, Sadkowski, Sadłowski, Sadowski, Sawiński, Seeloff, Siciński, Sieliski, Sielnicki, Siemakowski, Siemianowski, Sierzik, Silnicki, Siruć, Siwakowski, Skarbek, Skawiński, Skąpski, Skępski, Skroboński, Slesiński, Sleszyński, Słoński, Smoliński, Sobocki, Sobotkiewicz, Sokołowski, Sreczkowski, Sroczkowski, Starodumski, Staryński, Starzyński, Stawowski, Stawrowicz, Stąpczewski, Stempczyński, Stępczeński, Stępczyński, Stęprzeński, Stęprzyński, Stępski, Strawiński, Stroński, Struński, Stryjewski, Stryjowski, Strzecki, Strzelecki, Sucymiński, Sulko, Sułko, Suski, Swietlik, Swinarski, Syrnia, Syruć, Szczedetowicz, Szczycki, Szczytski, Szlikiewicz, Szlykiewicz, Szyłański, Szymkiewicz, Szynyk, Szytański,

Śledź, Ślerzyński, Ślesiński, Śleszyński, Śreczkowski, Średnicki, Świdnicki, Świnarski,

Taraniewski, Teuto, Trzecki,

Wardyński, Wialbut, Włodkowski, Włotkowski, Wolski, Wrembski, Wrębski, Wrzebski, Wrzębski, Wrzępski,

Zacharewicz, Zacharowicz, Zacharzewski, Zakrzewski, Zalchocki, Załaski, Załąski, Załęcki, Załęski, Zambrowski, Zelecki, Zeleński, Zeliński, Zembrzuski, Zielecki, Zielendzki, Zieleński, Zielęcki, Zielęski, Zieliński, Zrażewski, Zynda,

Żalchowski, Żelęcki, Żydowski.
