= Zukhov =

Zukhov may refer to:

- Zhukov, Russian surname
- Jim Barrell (b. 1959), wrestler whose stage name is "Boris Zukhov"

== See also ==
- Žukov (disambiguation)
