= Jan Lutek =

Bishop of Kraków

- Bishop of Krakow
- Previous post: Bishop of Kujawy

Personal details
- Born: Brzezia
- Died: 1471
- Coat of arms

Jan Lutek (died 1471) was a Polish diplomat and clergyman. He was Bishop of Kraków (1464–1471) and Vice-Chancellor to the Crown.

Lutek was born in Brzezia. His family claimed the Doliwa crest. Around the beginning of the Thirteen Years' War, Lutek was sent as a diplomat to the Imperial Diet of the Holy Roman Empire to discourage support for the Teutonic Knights. In May 1454, he again visited the Diet to warn of the Ottoman conquest of Moldavia, which he claimed threatened Poland and Hungary.

In March 1466, as Bishop of Kraków, Lutek issued an indulgence that offered remission to recipients who carried out a series of prayers and other religious activities. He died in 1471. Biographer Stanisław Karwowski mentions that Lutek had a temper but was generous to the poor.

== See also ==
- Polish and German relations in the Middle Ages
- Archdiocese of Kraków
