= Żuków, Busko County =

Żuków
- Village
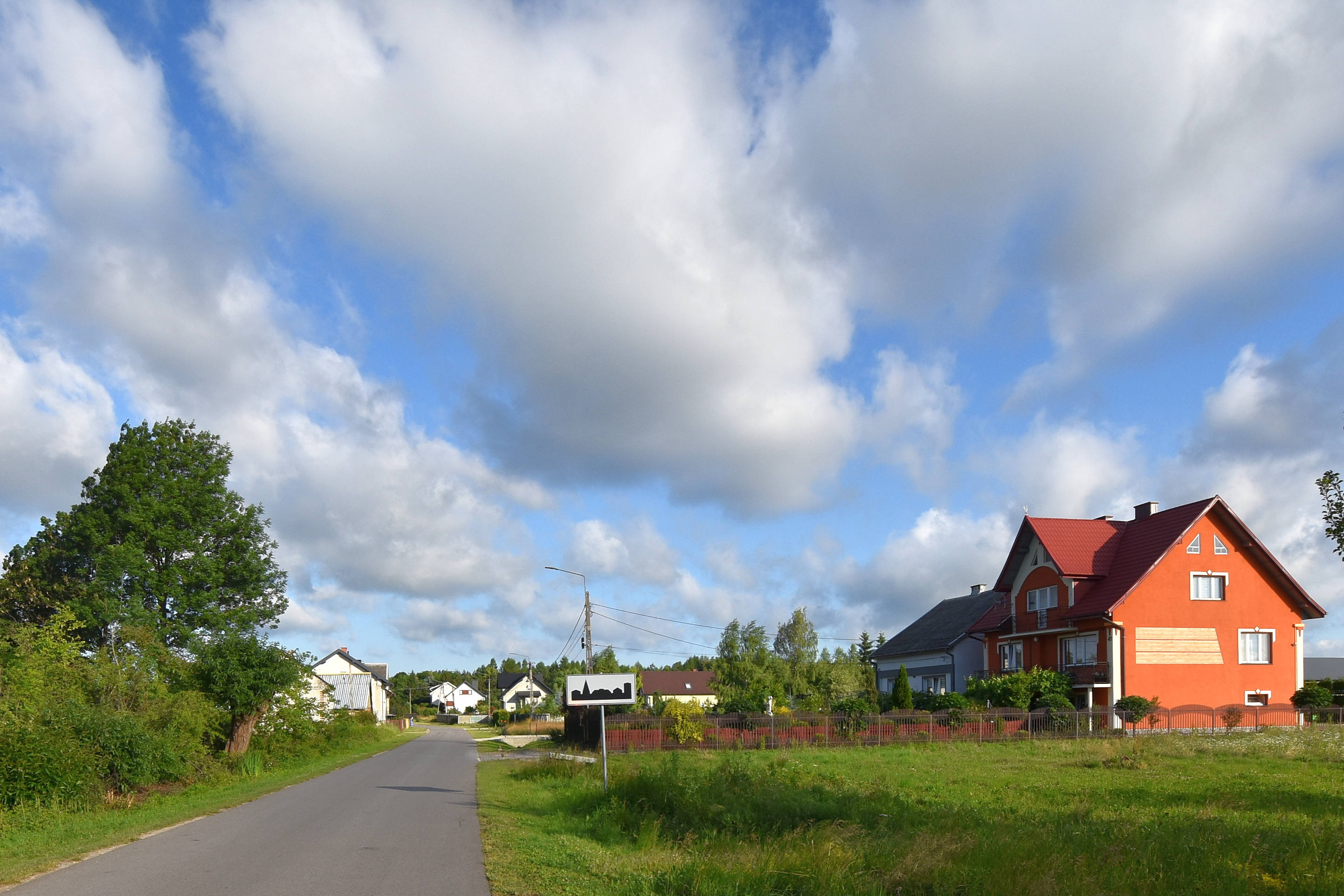

- Location within Poland
- Coordinates: 50°23′19″N 20°52′19″E
- Country: Poland
- Voivodeship: Świętokrzyskie
- County: Busko
- Gmina: Solec-Zdrój

Żuków [ˈʐukuf] is a village in the administrative district of Gmina Solec-Zdrój, within Busko County, Świętokrzyskie Voivodeship, in south-central Poland. It lies approximately 3 km (2 mi) north-west of Solec-Zdrój, 15 km (9 mi) south-east of Busko-Zdrój, and 58 km (36 mi) south of the regional capital Kielce.
