= Albert E. Bennett =

American politician and lawyer (1914-1971)

Albert E. Bennett (April 15, 1914 – October 11, 1971) was an American politician and lawyer.

Bennett was born in Chicago, Illinois. He went to the Chicago public schools and to the Morgan Park Military Academy. He received his bachelor's degree from Northwestern University in 1939 and his law degree from DePaul University College of Law in 1945. Bennett was admitted to the Illinois bar in 1945 and practiced law in Chicago. Bennett served in the Illinois Senate from 1957 to 1961 and from 1967 to 1971. He was a Republican. In 1970, he was appointed to the Illinois Racing Board and served as the secretary of the racing board. Bennett died at Belmont Hospital and Chicago, Illinois.
