= Žukov =

Žukov may refer to:

- Dolní Žukov, a village, now part of the town of Český Těšín, Czech Republic
- Horní Žukov, a village, now part of the town of Český Těšín, Czech Republic

== See also ==
- Zukhov (disambiguation)
