= Donald T. Swinarski =

American businessman and politician

Donald T. Swinarski (February 6, 1935 – May 29, 2006) was an American businessman and politician.

Swinarski was born in Chicago, Illinois. He went to Morgan Park Academy and Oceanside Carlsbad College. He graduated from Knox College and was in the insurance business in Chicago. He served in the United States Marine Corps during the Korean War. Swinarski served on the Chicago City Council and was a Democrat. Swinarski served in the Illinois Senate from 1973 to 1975. In 1975, he was convicted accepting brides for approving zoning changes in his district. In 1976, he moved to Fort Lauderdale, Florida. Swinarski died in Fort Lauderdale, Florida. His father Theodore Swinarski also served in the Illinois General Assembly.

== Notes ==
Illinois Senate
Preceded by Theodore Swinarski	Member of the Illinois Senate from the 25th district 1973–1975	Succeeded by LeRoy Lemke
