= Theodore Swinarski =

American politician and businessman

Member of the Illinois Senate

Member of the Illinois House of Representatives

Personal details
- Party: Democratic

Theodore A. Swinarski (November 25, 1905 – July 21, 1992) was an American politician and businessman.

Born in Chicago, Illinois, Swinarski was educated in the Chicago public and parochial schools. Swinarski was an Illinois state police officer. He served as clerk for the Cook County Circuit Court and owned a trucking firm.: D&D Trucking Firm. He served in the Illinois House of Representatives and the Illinois Senate. He was a Democrat. Swinarski died at his home in Fort Lauderdale, Florida. His son Donald T. Swinarski also served in the Illinois General Assembly.
