= Solec-Zdrój =

- Village
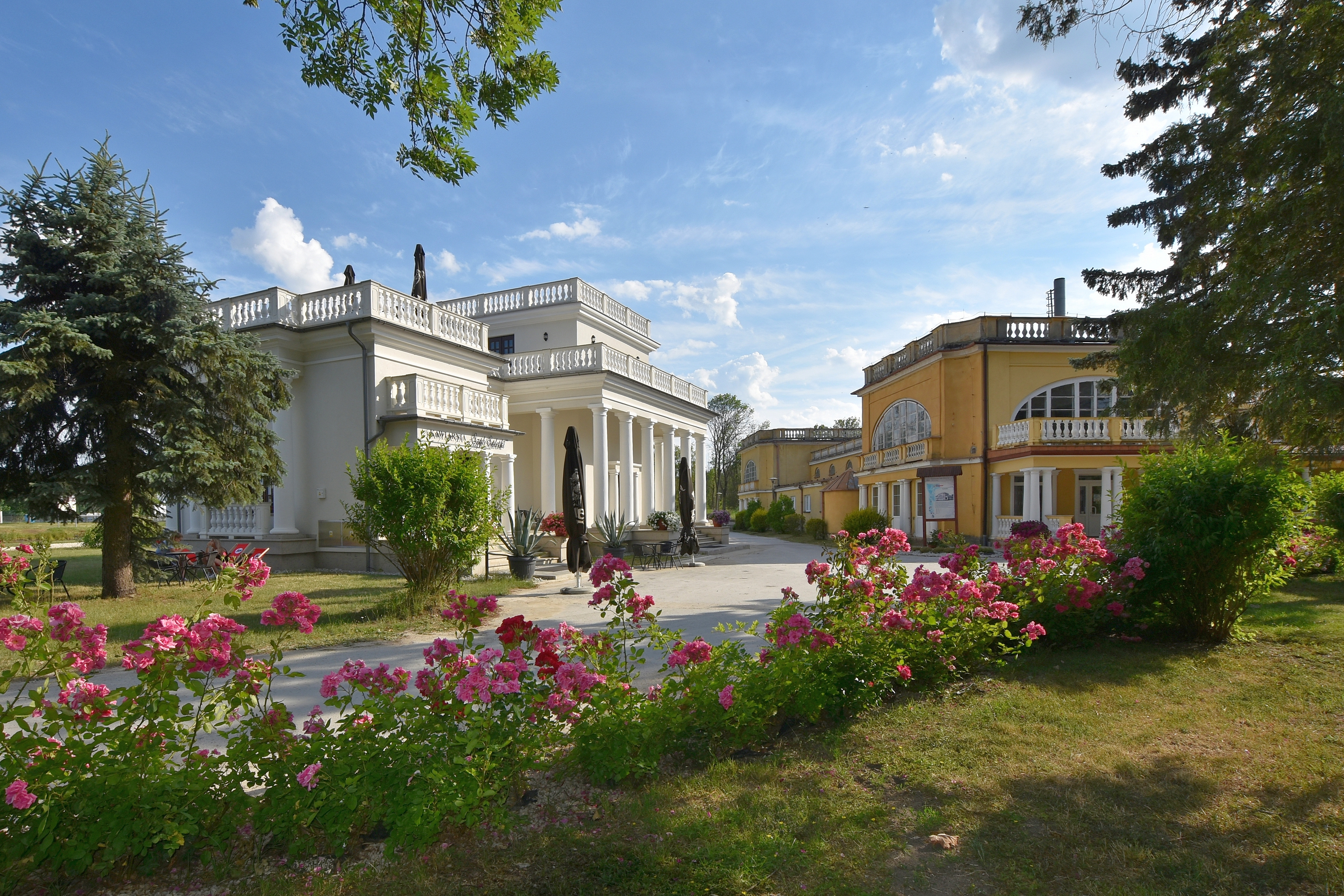
- Spa buildings in the spa park

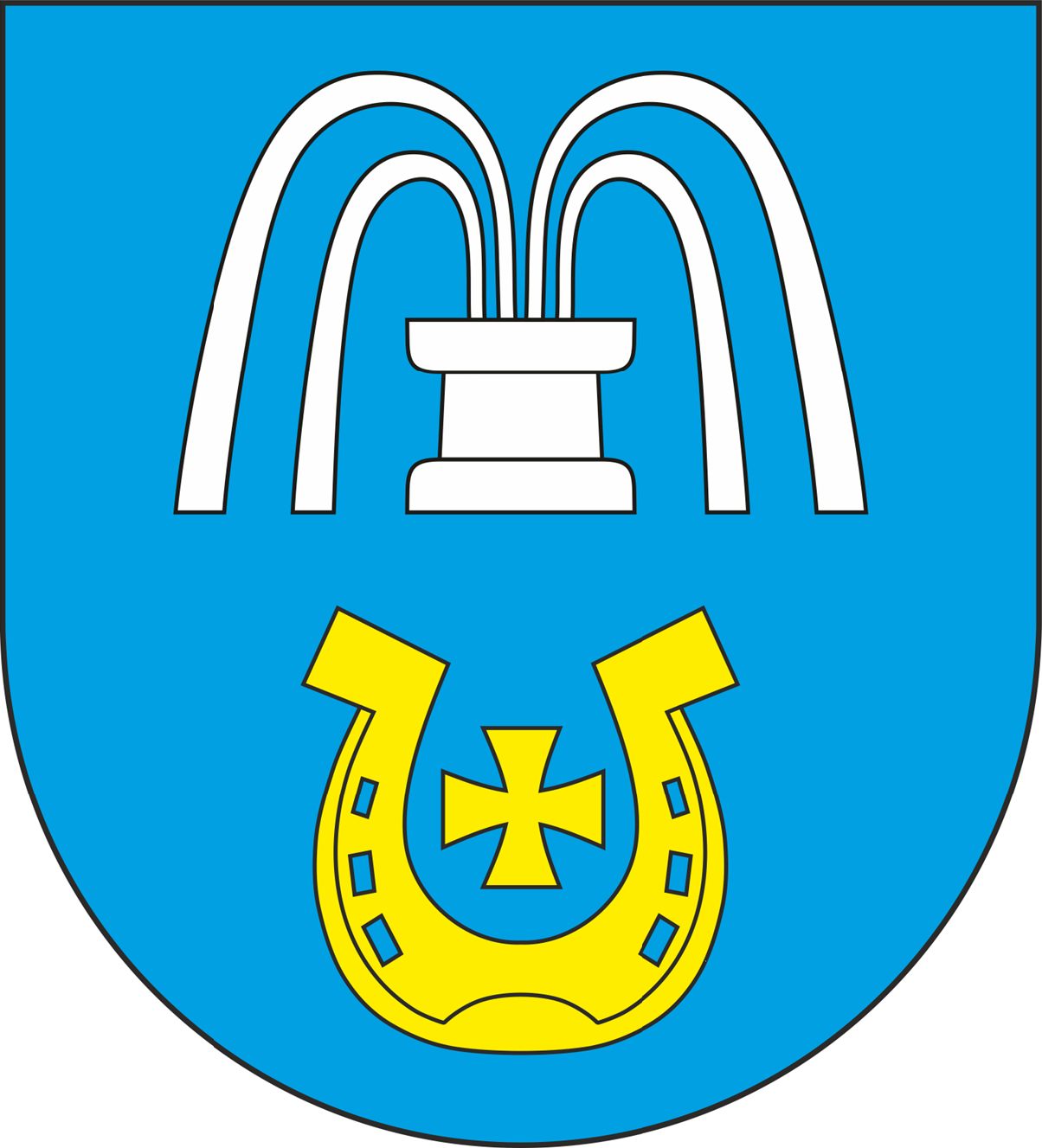
- Coat of arms

- Location within Poland
- Coordinates: 50°21′59″N 20°53′13″E
- Country: Poland
- Voivodeship: Świętokrzyskie
- County: Busko
- Gmina: Solec-Zdrój

Government
  - Mayor: Piotr Kalita (PSL)

Area
  - Total: 84.9 km^{2} (32.8 sq mi)

Population (approx.)
  - Total: 900
  - Density: 11/km^{2} (27/sq mi)
- Postal code: 28-131
- Area code: (+48) 41
- Vehicle registration: TBU
- Website: www.solec-zdroj.eu

Solec-Zdrój ([ˈsɔlɛt͡s ˈzdrui̯]) is a spa village in Busko County, Świętokrzyskie Voivodeship, in southern Poland. It is the seat of the gmina (administrative district) called Gmina Solec-Zdrój. It lies on the Rzoska river in historic Lesser Poland, approximately 17 km (11 mi) south-east of Busko-Zdrój and 61 km (38 mi) south of the regional capital Kielce.

== History ==
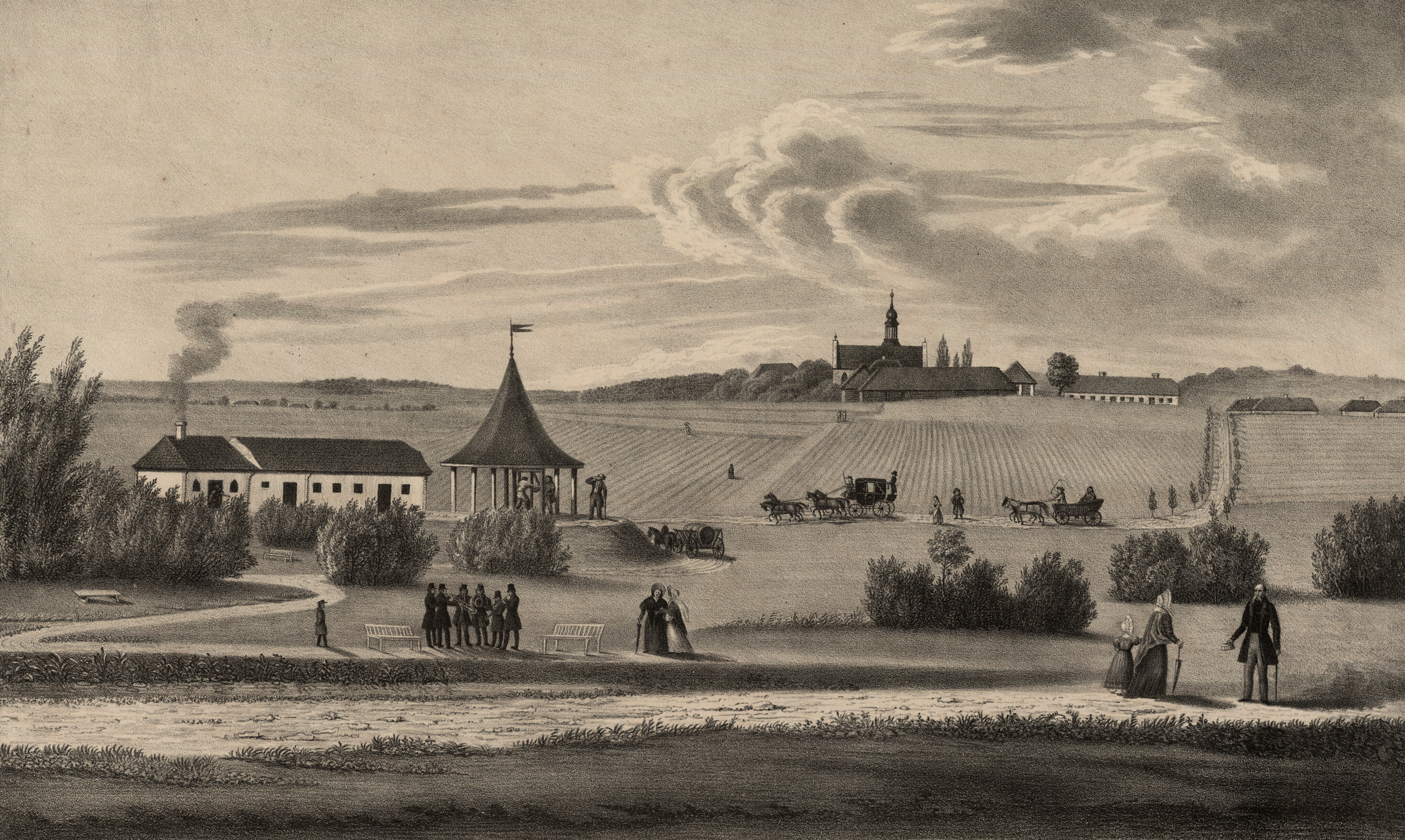
View of Solec before 1836

First documented mentions of Solec come from the first half of the 14th century, and its name comes from salt deposits, which were discovered in the area of the village. By the 15th century, it already was the seat of a Roman Catholic parish, which included six other villages. In the early 16th century, Solec, which had been property of the Tarnowski family, was purchased by the Zborowski family. In the same period, the village was burned to the ground in a Crimean Tatar raid of Lesser Poland, and its residents were either murdered or kidnapped. Solec slowly recovered, to be ransacked and burned again in the catastrophic Swedish invasion of Poland. After Swedish wars, the village ceased to exist for some time.

In the late 18th and early 19th century, Solec emerged as a local center of salt production. Salt plant was founded here, and in 1815 an engineer named Becker found here rich deposits of mineral water. Soon afterwards, the owner of the village, Walery Wieloglowski decided to open here a spa, offering curative baths. After failed November Uprising however, Wieloglowski was forced by the Russians to abandon Solec and emigrate. New owner of the village, Karol Godeffroy decided to keep the spa, building wooden baths, a guest house, and a mineral water drinking house. In 1837, Solec officially received the status of a spa town, after which a hospital, a hotel, public houses, a park and several other facilities were opened. The village quickly grew, and in the early 20th century was purchased by brothers Romuald and Włodzimierz Daniewski. They modernized Solec, turning it into a fashionable spa town, which in the Second Polish Republic attracted several notable guests, such as Ignacy Jan Paderewski, Eugeniusz Kwiatkowski, opera singer Wanda Werminska, actor Aleksander Zelwerowicz. In 1921, several wooden bath houses burned in a fire, and by the late 1920s, they were replaced by a new, Classicistic complex.

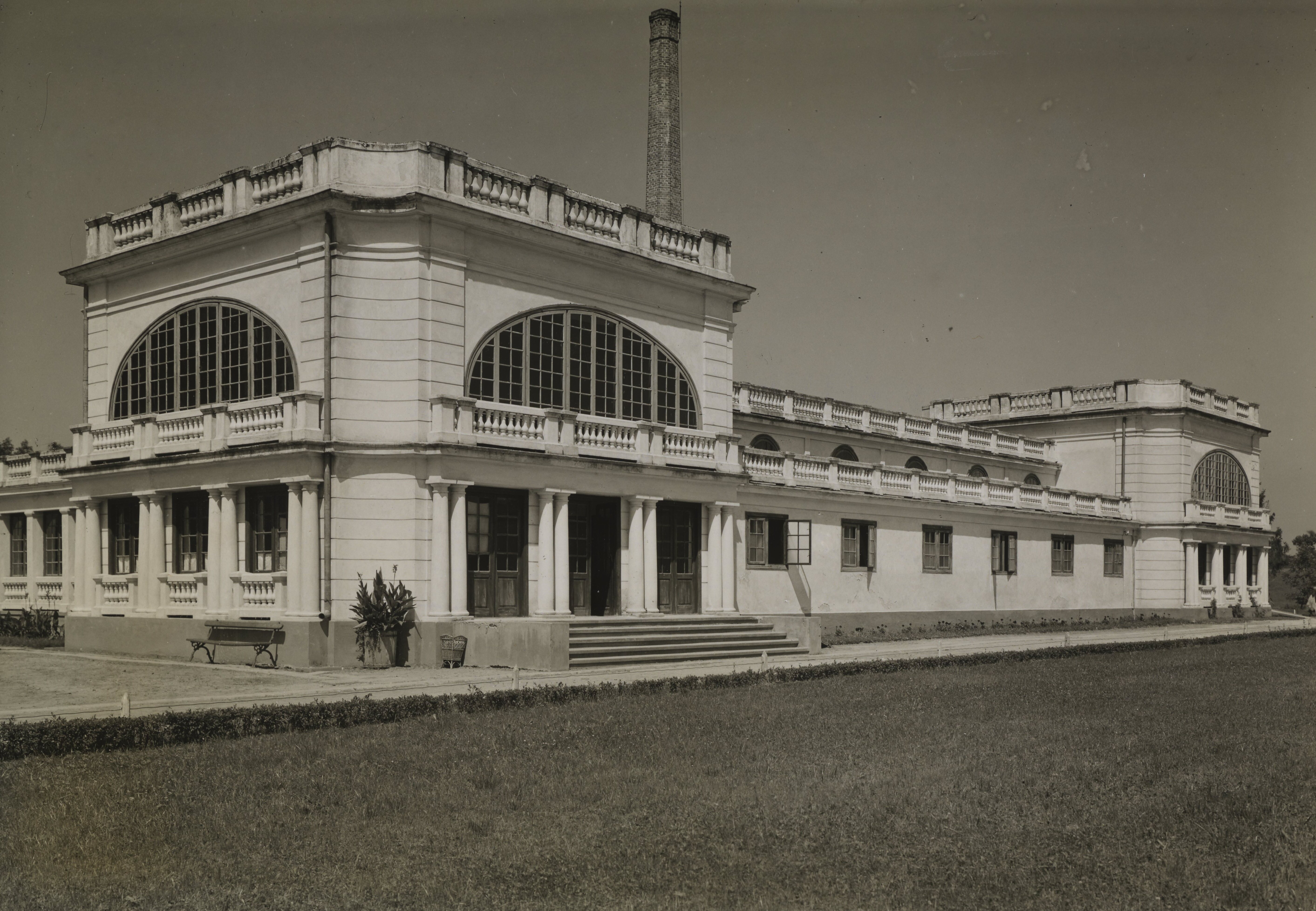
Baths in Solec in the 1930s

After the German-Soviet invasion of Poland, which started World War II in September 1939, Solec was occupied by Germany.

After World War II, the Soviet-installed Communist government of the People's Republic of Poland forcibly nationalized the spa, merging it with another local town, Busko-Zdrój, and creating a company called Uzdrowisko Busko-Solec. In 1974, the name of the settlement was changed from Solec to Solec-Zdrój. After 1989, rightful owners managed to get back their property, and since 2000, the spa was property of the Daniewski and the Dzianotta families. Currently, there are 400 beds for patients, and the spa cures rheumatism, osteoarthritis, allergies and dermatitis.

== Sights ==
Solec-Zdrój is the starting point of a red tourist trail, which leads to Busko-Zdrój, and a stop along green trail from Wiślica to Grochowiska. Apart from the spa itself, the village has St. Nicholas church, which was first mentioned in 1326. There also are several early 20th-century houses and villas.
