= Legarda =

Legarda may refer to:

== People ==
- Legarda (singer), Colombian singer and internet personality
- Benito Legarda (1853-1915), Filipino legislator
- Bernardo de Legarda (c. 1700 – 1773), Ecuadorian sculptor and painter
- Katrina Legarda (active from 1975), Filipino lawyer
- Loren Legarda (born 1960), Filipino environmentalist, cultural worker, journalist, and politician
- Trinidad Legarda (1899-1998), Filipina suffragist, clubwoman, philanthropist, and editor

== Other uses ==
- Legarda, Navarre, a town and municipality located in the province and autonomous community of Navarre, northern Spain
- Legarda, Poland, a village in the administrative district of Gmina Gostynin, Gostynin County, Masovian Voivodeship, in east-central Poland
- Legarda Elementary School, a public elementary school located in Sampaloc in the City of Manila
- Legarda station, a station on the Manila Line 2
- Legarda Street, Sampaloc district in Manila, Philippines

== See also ==
- Legarda Ancestral House, San Miguel, Manila, Philippines
