= Jaworek =

Jaworek may refer to:

== Places in Poland ==
- Jaworek, Kłodzko County in Lower Silesian Voivodeship (south-west Poland)
- Jaworek, Ząbkowice County in Lower Silesian Voivodeship (south-west Poland)
- Jaworek, Łódź Voivodeship (central Poland)
- Jaworek, Gostynin County in Masovian Voivodeship (east-central Poland)
- Jaworek, Węgrów County in Masovian Voivodeship (east-central Poland)
- Jaworek, Opole Voivodeship (south-west Poland)

== People ==
- Tomasz Jaworek, Polish footballer
