= Baby Górne =

- Village
- Location within Poland
- Coordinates: 52°25′40″N 19°20′25″E
- Country: Poland
- Voivodeship: Masovian
- County: Gostynin
- Gmina: Gostynin

Population
  - Total: 120
- Time zone: UTC+1 (CET)
  - Summer (DST): UTC+2 (CEST)
- Postcode: 09-500
- Vehicle registration: WGS

Baby Górne [ˈbabɨ ˈɡurnɛ] is a village in the administrative district of Gmina Gostynin, within Gostynin County, Masovian Voivodeship, in central Poland.

== See also ==
- Baby Dolne
