= Bielawy, Gostynin County =

Bielawy
- Village
- Location within Poland
- Coordinates: 52°25′25″N 19°33′20″E
- Country: Poland
- Voivodeship: Masovian
- County: Gostynin
- Gmina: Gostynin
- Postal code: 09-500
- Vehicle registration: WGS

Bielawy [bjɛˈlavɨ] is a village in the administrative district of Gmina Gostynin, within Gostynin County, Masovian Voivodeship, in central Poland.
