= Model, Masovian Voivodeship =

Model
- Village
- Location within Poland
- Coordinates: 52°17′28″N 19°42′30″E
- Country: Poland
- Voivodeship: Masovian
- County: Gostynin
- Gmina: Pacyna
- Time zone: UTC+1 (CET)
  - Summer (DST): UTC+2 (CEST)
- Vehicle registration: WGS

Model [ˈmɔdɛl] is a village in the administrative district of Gmina Pacyna, within Gostynin County, Masovian Voivodeship, in central Poland.
