= Przylaski, Masovian Voivodeship =

Przylaski
- Village
- Location within Poland
- Coordinates: 52°18′54″N 19°40′30″E
- Country: Poland
- Voivodeship: Masovian
- County: Gostynin
- Gmina: Pacyna
- Time zone: UTC+1 (CET)
  - Summer (DST): UTC+2 (CEST)
- Vehicle registration: WGS

Przylaski [pʂɨˈlaski] is a village in the administrative district of Gmina Pacyna. It resides within Gostynin County, Masovian Voivodeship, in central Poland.
