= Podatkówek =

Place in Gmina Pacyna, Poland

- Location within Poland
- Coordinates: 52°15′44″N 19°40′04″E
- Country: Poland
- Voivodeship: Masovian
- County: Gostynin
- Gmina: Pacyna
- Time zone: UTC+1 (CET)
  - Summer (DST): UTC+2 (CEST)
- Vehicle registration: WGS

Podatkówek [pɔdatˈkuvɛk] is a village in the administrative district of Gmina Pacyna, within Gostynin County, Masovian Voivodeship, in central Poland.
