= Helenów, Gmina Gostynin =

Helenów
- Village
- Location within Poland
- Coordinates: 52°28′29″N 19°28′35″E
- Country: Poland
- Voivodeship: Masovian
- County: Gostynin
- Gmina: Gostynin
- Time zone: UTC+1 (CET)
  - Summer (DST): UTC+2 (CEST)

Helenów [xɛˈlɛnuf] is a village in the administrative district of Gmina Gostynin, within Gostynin County, Masovian Voivodeship, in central Poland.

== History ==
During World War II, the village was occupied by Germany from 1939 to 1945. Before World War II, this town (as well as nearby Unisławice) belonged to the German Renz family. As a result of reforms in the late 1940s and early 1950s, the estate was taken over by the state, and the family moved to the areas of Gostynin, Nowy Dwór Mazowiecki, Warsaw, and some returned to the family in Germany (Magdeburg, Bayreuth). In the 1970s, the family manor burned down and no trace of the former family ruling there remained.
