= Górki Pierwsze =

Village in Gmina Gostynin, Poland

- Village
- Location within Poland
- Coordinates: 52°28′00″N 19°20′17″E
- Country: Poland
- Voivodeship: Masovian
- County: Gostynin
- Gmina: Gostynin
- Time zone: UTC+1 (CET)
  - Summer (DST): UTC+2 (CEST)
- Vehicle registration: WGS

Górki Pierwsze [ˈɡurki ˈpjɛrfʂɛ] is a village in the administrative district of Gmina Gostynin, within Gostynin County, Masovian Voivodeship, in central Poland.
