= Sokołów, Gostynin County =

Sokołów
- Village
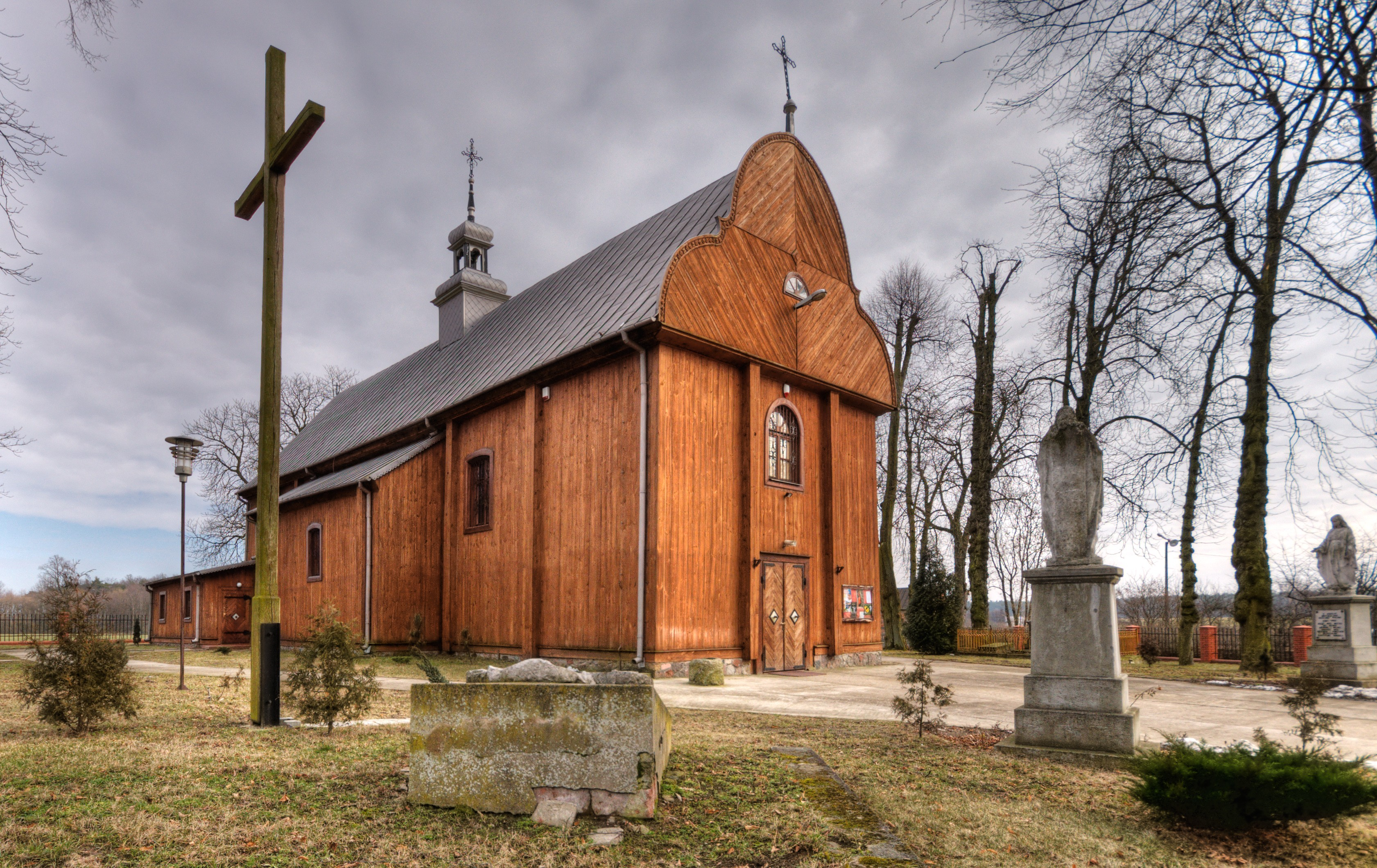
- Saint Anne Church

- Location within Poland
- Coordinates: 52°23′N 19°20′E
- Country: Poland
- Voivodeship: Masovian
- County: Gostynin
- Gmina: Gostynin
- Population: 230
- Time zone: UTC+1 (CET)
  - Summer (DST): UTC+2 (CEST)
- Vehicle registration: WGS

Sokołów [sɔˈkɔwuf] is a village in the administrative district of Gmina Gostynin, within Gostynin County, Masovian Voivodeship, in central Poland.
