= Huta =

Huta (also "guta", meaning "foundry" or "glass production shop" in Slavic languages) may refer to people or places:

== People ==
- Huta Akhmadov (1972 – 1999), Chechen military leader
- Orinda Huta (born 1987), Albanian singer and television presenter

== Settlements ==
=== Belarus ===
==== Brest Oblast ====
- Huta, Baranavichy District
- Huta, Brest District
- Huta, Hantsavichy District
- Huta, Drahichyn District
- Huta, Lyakhavichy District
- Huta, Pruzhany District

==== Gomel Oblast ====
- Huta, Vetka District
- Huta, Rahachow District

==== Grodno Oblast ====
- Huta, Ashmyany
- Huta, Voranava village, Voranava
- Huta, Palyatskishki village, Voranava

==== Minsk Oblast ====
- Huta, Berezan District
- Huta, Valozhyn District
- Huta, Krupki District
- Huta, Uzda District

==== Mogilyov Oblast ====
- Huta, Levyadzanka village, Byalynichy District
- Huta, Tsyakhtsin village, Byalynichy District
- Huta, Kirawsk District
- Huta, Klimavichy District

==== Vitebsk Oblast ====
- Huta, Pastavy District
- Huta, Talachyn District
- Huta, Ushachy District

=== Poland ===
- Nowa Huta, a steel-producing district in the east of Kraków
- Huta, Lower Silesian Voivodeship (south-west Poland)
- Huta, Bydgoszcz County in Kuyavian-Pomeranian Voivodeship (north-central Poland)
- Huta, Tuchola County in Kuyavian-Pomeranian Voivodeship (north-central Poland)
- Huta, Lipno County in Kuyavian-Pomeranian Voivodeship (north-central Poland)
- Huta, Rypin County in Kuyavian-Pomeranian Voivodeship (north-central Poland)
- Huta, Chełm County in Lublin Voivodeship (east Poland)
- Huta, Krasnystaw County in Lublin Voivodeship (east Poland)
- Huta, Kraśnik County in Lublin Voivodeship (east Poland)
- Huta, Augustów County in Podlaskie Voivodeship (north-east Poland)
- Huta, Gmina Filipów in Podlaskie Voivodeship (north-east Poland)
- Huta, Gmina Suwałki in Podlaskie Voivodeship (north-east Poland)
- Huta, Bełchatów County in Łódź Voivodeship (central Poland)
- Huta, Pajęczno County in Łódź Voivodeship (central Poland)
- Huta, Piotrków County in Łódź Voivodeship (central Poland)
- Huta, Wieruszów County in Łódź Voivodeship (central Poland)
- Huta, Gmina Baranów in Lublin Voivodeship (east Poland)
- Huta, Gmina Wąwolnica in Lublin Voivodeship (east Poland)
- Huta, Włodawa County in Lublin Voivodeship (east Poland)
- Huta, Świętokrzyskie Voivodeship (south-central Poland)
- Huta, Ciechanów County in Masovian Voivodeship (east-central Poland)
- Huta, Lipsko County in Masovian Voivodeship (east-central Poland)
- Huta, Przysucha County in Masovian Voivodeship (east-central Poland)
- Huta, Radom County in Masovian Voivodeship (east-central Poland)
- Huta, Szydłowiec County in Masovian Voivodeship (east-central Poland)
- Huta Zaborowska, Gmina Gostynin, Masovian voivodeship
- Huta, Żuromin County in Masovian Voivodeship (east-central Poland)
- Huta, Czarnków-Trzcianka County in Greater Poland Voivodeship (west-central Poland)
- Huta, Kalisz County in Greater Poland Voivodeship (west-central Poland)
- Huta, Gmina Odolanów, Ostrów County in Greater Poland Voivodeship (west-central Poland)
- Huta, Złotów County in Greater Poland Voivodeship (west-central Poland)
- Huta Szklana, Greater Poland Voivodeship
- Huta, Chojnice County in Pomeranian Voivodeship (north Poland)
- Huta, Słupsk County in Pomeranian Voivodeship (north Poland)
- Huta, Warmian-Masurian Voivodeship (north Poland)

=== Romania ===
- Huta, a village in Boianu Mare Commune, Bihor County
- Huta, a village in Chiuiești Commune, Cluj County
- Huta, a village in Buciumi, Sălaj

=== Russia ===
==== Bryansk Oblast ====
- Guta, a village in Zlynkovsky rayon, Bryansk oblast
- Guta, a former settlement in Navlinskyi rayon, Bryansk oblast

==== Pskov oblast ====
- Guta, a village in Sebezshkyi rayon, Pskov oblast

==== Smolensk oblast ====
- Guta, a village in Pochinkovskyi rayon, Smolensk oblast
- Guta, a village in Khislavichskyi rayon, Smolenks oblast

=== Ukraine ===
There are at least 90 populated places in Ukraine that carry name of Huta or its derivatives.

==== Cherkasy Oblast ====
- Huta Mezhyritska, Cherkasy Raion

==== Chernihiv Oblast ====
- Huta, Novhorod-Siverskyi Raion

==== Ivano-Frankivsk Oblast ====
- Huta, Ivano-Frankivsk Raion

==== Khmelnytskyi Oblast ====
- Huta, Derazhnia urban hromada, Khmelnytskyi Raion
- Huta, Vinkivtsi urban hromada, Khmelnytskyi Raion
- Huta, Shepetivka Raion

==== Kyiv Oblast ====
- Huta, Bila Tserkva Raion

==== Lviv Oblast ====
- Huta, Chervonohrad Raion
- Huta, Drohobych Raion
- Huta, Zolochiv Raion
- Huta Obedynska, Lviv Raion
- Huta Oleska, Zolochiv Raion, now Hutyshche

==== Rivne Oblast ====
- Huta, Kostopil Raion

==== Sumy Oblast ====
- Huta, Hlukhiv Raion

==== Vinnytsia Oblast ====
- Huta, Nemyriv Raion

==== Volyn Oblast ====
- Huta, Ratne Raion

==== Zakarpattia Oblast ====
- Huta, Uzhhorod Raion

== Lakes ==
- Huta, Pruzhany Raion, Brest Voblast
- Huta, Rechytsa Raion, Homel Voblast

== See also ==
- Stara Huta (disambiguation)
- Nowa Huta (disambiguation)
- Huty, several toponyms in Ukraine and Slovakia
- Guta (disambiguation)
