= Rumunki =

Rumunki may refer to the following places:

- Rumunki, Kuyavian-Pomeranian Voivodeship (north-central Poland)
- Rumunki, Gostynin County in Masovian Voivodeship (east-central Poland)
- Rumunki, Płock County in Masovian Voivodeship (east-central Poland)
- Rumunki, Pomeranian Voivodeship (north Poland)
- Rumunki, Warmian-Masurian Voivodeship (north Poland)
