= Rybne =

Rybne may refer to the following places in Europe:

- Rybné, a municipality and village in the Czech Republic
- Rybne, Podkarpackie Voivodeship in Poland
- Rybne, Masovian Voivodeship in Poland
- Rybne, a village in Ivano-Frankivsk Raion, Ivano-Frankivsk Oblast, Ukraine
