= Wola Pacyńska =

- Village
- Location within Poland
- Coordinates: 52°19′45″N 19°44′49″E
- Country: Poland
- Voivodeship: Masovian
- County: Gostynin
- Gmina: Pacyna
- Time zone: UTC+1 (CET)
  - Summer (DST): UTC+2 (CEST)
- Vehicle registration: WGS

Wola Pacyńska [ˈvɔla paˈt͡sɨɲska] is a village in the administrative district of Gmina Pacyna, within Gostynin County, Masovian Voivodeship, in central Poland.

== See also ==
- Wola, for other uses of the word
