= Lucień =

- Village
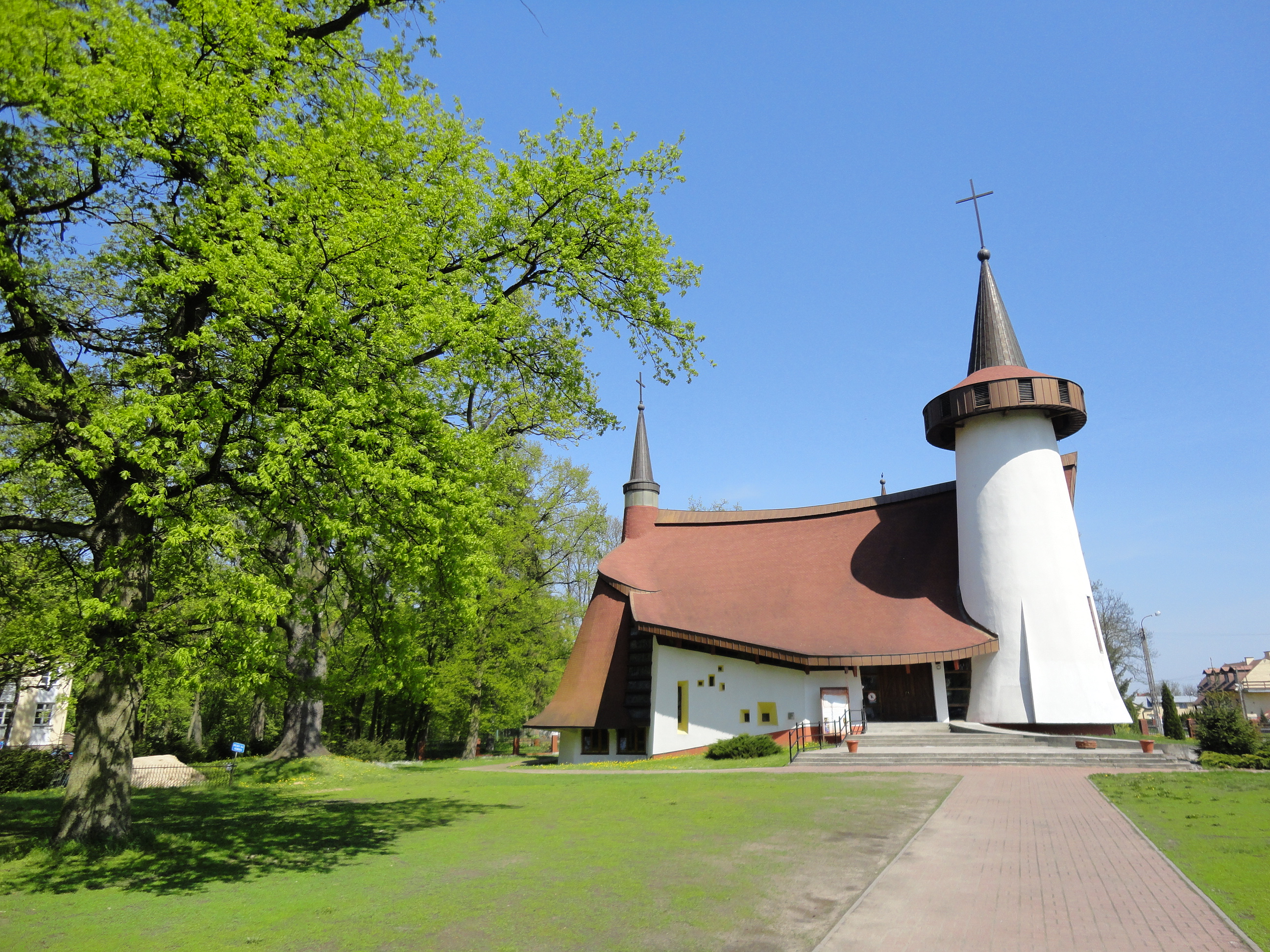
- St. Casimir church in Lucień

- Location within Poland
- Coordinates: 52°29′22″N 19°28′32″E
- Country: Poland
- Voivodeship: Masovian
- County: Gostynin
- Gmina: Gostynin
- Time zone: UTC+1 (CET)
  - Summer (DST): UTC+2 (CEST)
- Vehicle registration: WGS

Lucień [ˈlut͡ɕɛɲ] is a village in the administrative district of Gmina Gostynin, within Gostynin County, Masovian Voivodeship, in central Poland.
