= Łuszczanówek =

Village in Gmina Pacyna, Poland

- Village
- Location within Poland
- Coordinates: 52°19′22″N 19°41′09″E
- Country: Poland
- Voivodeship: Masovian
- County: Gostynin
- Gmina: Pacyna
- Time zone: UTC+1 (CET)
  - Summer (DST): UTC+2 (CEST)
- Vehicle registration: WGS

Łuszczanówek [wuʂt͡ʂaˈnuvɛk] is a village in the administrative district of Gmina Pacyna, in Gostynin County, Masovian Voivodeship, in central Poland.
