= Gorzewo =

Gorzewo may refer to the following places:

- Gorzewo, Oborniki County in Greater Poland Voivodeship (west-central Poland)
- Gorzewo, Gostynin County in Masovian Voivodeship (east-central Poland)
- Gorzewo, Sierpc County in Masovian Voivodeship (east-central Poland)
- Gorzewo, Wągrowiec County in Greater Poland Voivodeship (west-central Poland)
