= Lisitsa =

Lisitsa, or Lysytsya (Russian: Лисица, Ukrainian: Лисиця, Belarusian: Лісіца) is a Slavic surname. The word means "female fox" in several Slavic languages. Notable people with the surname include:

== People with the surname ==
- Alona Lisitsa (born 1971), Ukrainian rabbi
- Ihar Lisitsa (born 1988), Belarusian football player
- Mikhail Pavlovich Lisitsa (1921–2012), Ukrainian physicist
- Nataliya Lisitsa (born 1961), Russian luger
- Valentina Lisitsa (born 1970), Ukrainian pianist

== See also ==
- Lisica (disambiguation)
- 8064 Lisitsa, asteroid
