= Huhta =

Huhta is a surname. Notable people with the surname include:

- Jean-Louis Huhta (born 1965), Swedish musician, drummer, producer, and DJ
- Mira Huhta (born 1987), Finnish ice hockey player

== See also ==
- Huta (disambiguation)
