= Anielin, Gostynin County =

Anielin
- Village
- Location within Poland
- Coordinates: 52°22′04″N 19°27′50″E
- Country: Poland
- Voivodeship: Masovian
- County: Gostynin
- Gmina: Gostynin
- Time zone: UTC+1 (CET)
  - Summer (DST): UTC+2 (CEST)
- Vehicle registration: WGS

Anielin [aˈɲɛlin] is a village in the administrative district of Gmina Gostynin, within Gostynin County, Masovian Voivodeship, in central Poland. Anielin is situated near the Gostynin-Włocławek Landscape Park, a protected area known for its natural beauty and biodiversity.
