= Lisica =

Lisica ("female fox" in several Slavic languages) may refer to:

- LiSiCA (Ligand Similarity using Clique Algorithm), software used in molecular modelling
- Lisica (Gostynin), a village in Poland

== People with the surname ==
- Mateo Lisica (born 2003), Croatian football player
- Mileta Lisica (1966-2020), Serbian-Slovenian basketball player
- Rade Lisica (born 1997), Slovenian basketball player
- Slavko Lisica (1944–2013), Serbian major general

== See also ==
- Gollak-Lisica, a peak in the Gollak, Kosovo
- Lesica (disambiguation)
- Lisca (disambiguation)
