= Mysłownia Nowa =

- Village
- Location within Poland
- Coordinates: 52°25′18″N 19°32′6″E
- Country: Poland
- Voivodeship: Masovian
- County: Gostynin
- Gmina: Gostynin
- Population: 160
- Time zone: UTC+1 (CET)
  - Summer (DST): UTC+2 (CEST)
- Vehicle registration: WGS

Mysłownia Nowa [mɨˈswɔvɲa ˈnɔva] is a village in the administrative district of Gmina Gostynin, within Gostynin County, Masovian Voivodeship, in central Poland. It is situated approximately 5 km (3 mi) east of Gostynin and 103 km (64 mi) west of Warsaw.
