= Jan Ignacy Dąmbski =

Polish nobleman

Jan Ignacy Dąmbski (1740–1826 in Leśniewice) was a Polish nobleman and member of the Bar Confederation (1768–1771).

He accessed to Confederation probably in 1769. Dąmbski served as colonel under Mokronowski. He was involved in the defence of Lowicz (1769), battle of Błonie (1770) and in the Battle of Kutno (1770). In 1772 he was taken into captivity by the Russians.

He was married to Katarzyna Przysiecka with whom he had three daughters: Katarzyna, Maria and Konstancja and five sons: Kajetan, Józef, Nikodem, Wincenty and Jan.
