= Pacyna =

- Village
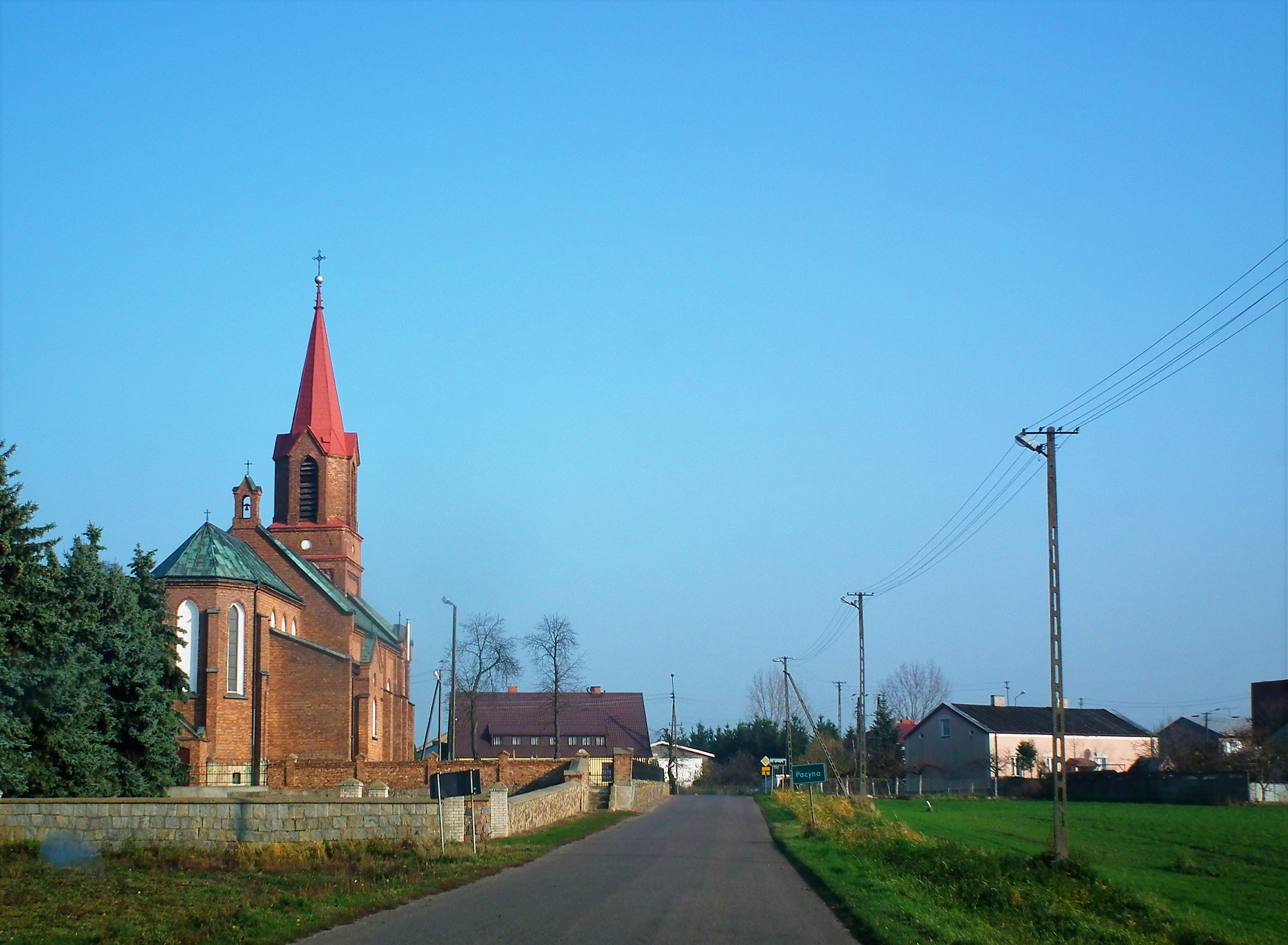

- Location within Poland
- Coordinates: 52°17′59″N 19°42′45″E
- Country: Poland
- Voivodeship: Masovian
- County: Gostynin
- Gmina: Pacyna

Population
  - Total: 220
- Postal code: 09-541
- Website: https://pacyna.mazowsze.pl/

Pacyna [paˈt͡sɨna] is a village in Gostynin County, Masovian Voivodeship, in central Poland. It is the seat of the gmina (administrative district) called Gmina Pacyna.

Pacyna was a private town, administratively located in the Gąbin County in the Rawa Voivodeship in the Greater Poland Province of the Kingdom of Poland.
