= Gorzewo, Gostynin County =

Gorzewo
- Village
- Location within Poland
- Coordinates: 52°29′16″N 19°31′07″E
- Country: Poland
- Voivodeship: Masovian
- County: Gostynin
- Gmina: Gostynin
- Time zone: UTC+1 (CET)
  - Summer (DST): UTC+2 (CEST)
- Vehicle registration: WGS

Gorzewo [ɡɔˈʐɛvɔ] is a village in the administrative district of Gmina Gostynin, within Gostynin County, Masovian Voivodeship, in central Poland.
