= Razbor =

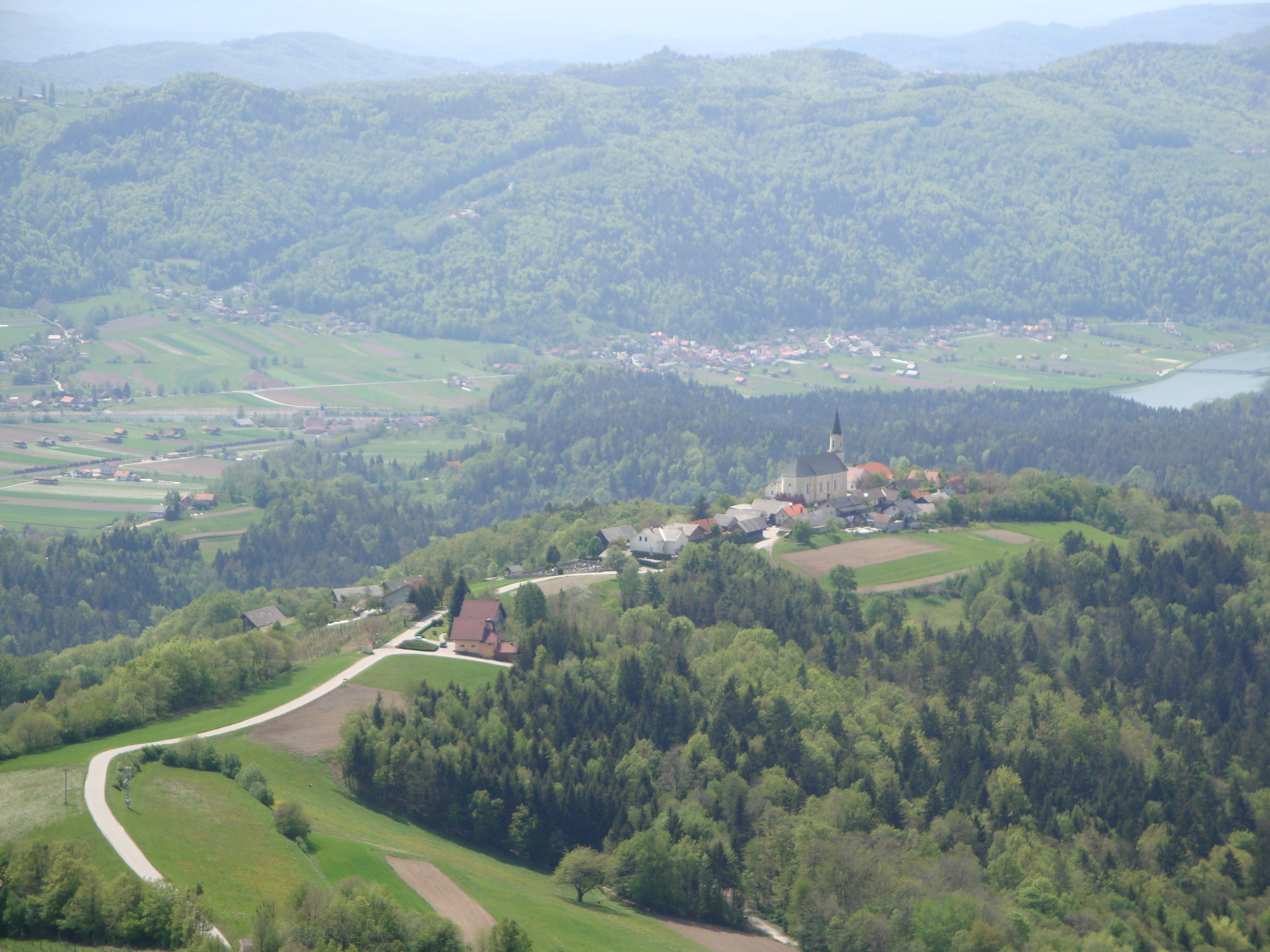
- Razbor from the trail to Lisca

- Location in Slovenia
- Coordinates: 46°3′33.72″N 15°15′25.02″E
- Country: Slovenia
- Traditional region: Styria
- Statistical region: Lower Sava
- Municipality: Sevnica

Area
  - Total: 4.07 km^{2} (1.57 sq mi)
- Elevation: 485 m (1,591 ft)

Population (2012)
  - Total: 157
  - Density: 39/km^{2} (100/sq mi)

Razbor (pronounced [ˈɾaːzbɔɾ]) is a village below Mount Lisca in the Municipality of Sevnica in east-central Slovenia. The area is part of the historical region of Styria. The municipality is now included in the Lower Sava Statistical Region.

Since 2000, the village has hosted the only Don Pierino drug rehabilitation community for women in Slovenia.

== Church ==
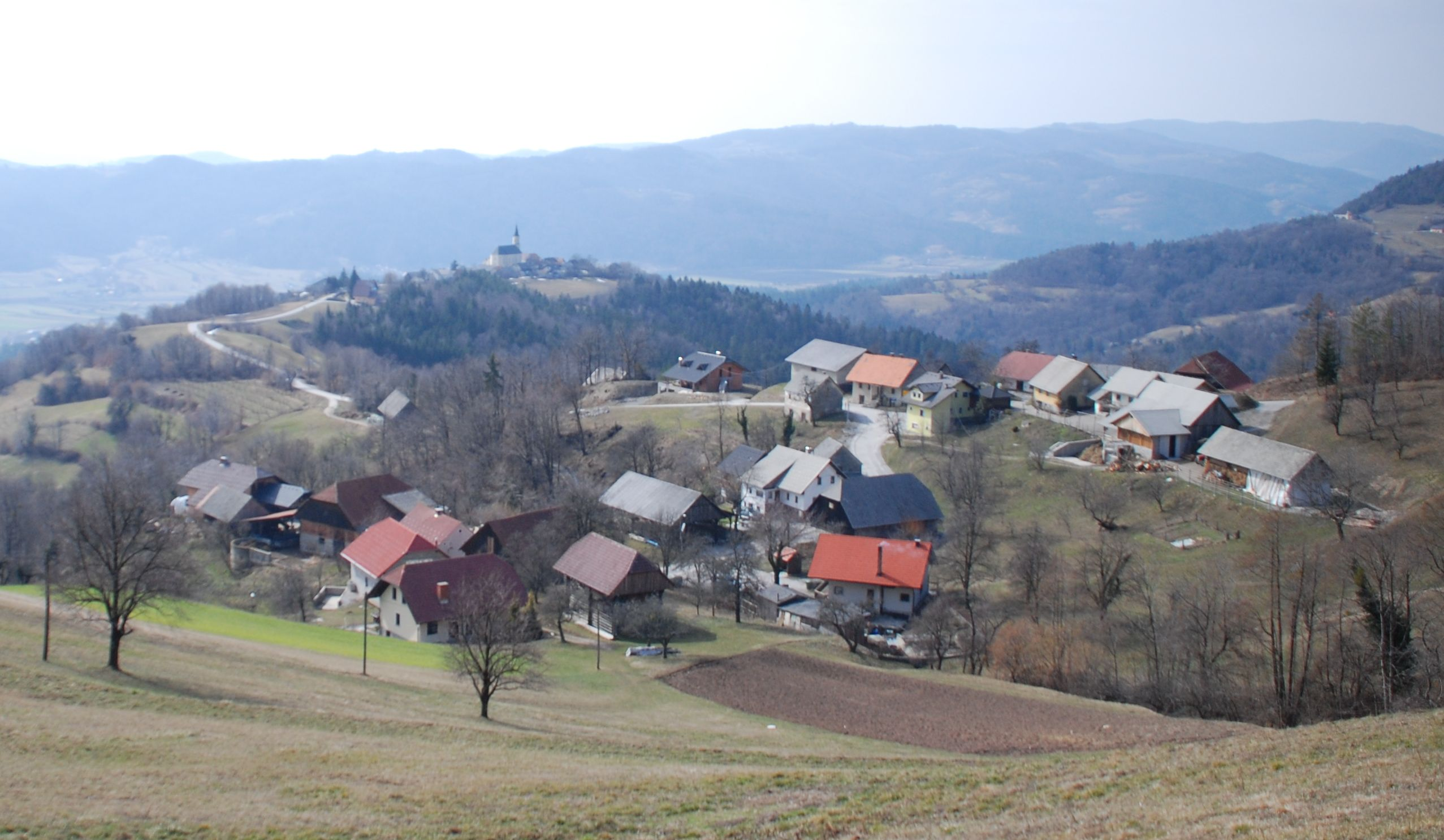
Lisce, a hamlet of Razbor, with St. John the Baptist Parish Church in the background

The parish church in the settlement is dedicated to John the Baptist and belongs to the Roman Catholic Diocese of Celje. It was built in 1868 in a Neo-Gothic style.
