= Lesica =

Lesica may refer to the following places in Poland:

- Lesica, Lower Silesian Voivodeship (south-west Poland)
- Lesica, Świętokrzyskie Voivodeship (south-central Poland)

== See also ==
- Lisica (disambiguation)
