= Nowa Huta (disambiguation) =

Nowa Huta is a district of Kraków, Poland.

Nowa Huta may also refer to the following places in Poland:

- Nowa Huta, Kuyavian-Pomeranian Voivodeship (north-central Poland)
- Nowa Huta, Subcarpathian Voivodeship (south-east Poland)
- Nowa Huta, Gmina Bieliny in Świętokrzyskie Voivodeship (south-central Poland)
- Nowa Huta, Gmina Raków in Świętokrzyskie Voivodeship (south-central Poland)
- Nowa Huta, Gostynin County in Masovian Voivodeship (east-central Poland)
- Nowa Huta, Żyrardów County in Masovian Voivodeship (east-central Poland)
- Nowa Huta, Greater Poland Voivodeship (west-central Poland)
- Nowa Huta, Pomeranian Voivodeship (north Poland)
