= Lisca =

Lisca may refer to:

- Lisca (hill), a hill in southeastern Slovenia
- Lisca (company), a Slovenian lingerie company
- Lisca (football manager), Brazilian football coach
- Lisca (genus)
