= Gmina Pacyna =

Gmina Pacyna Pacyna Commune
- Gmina
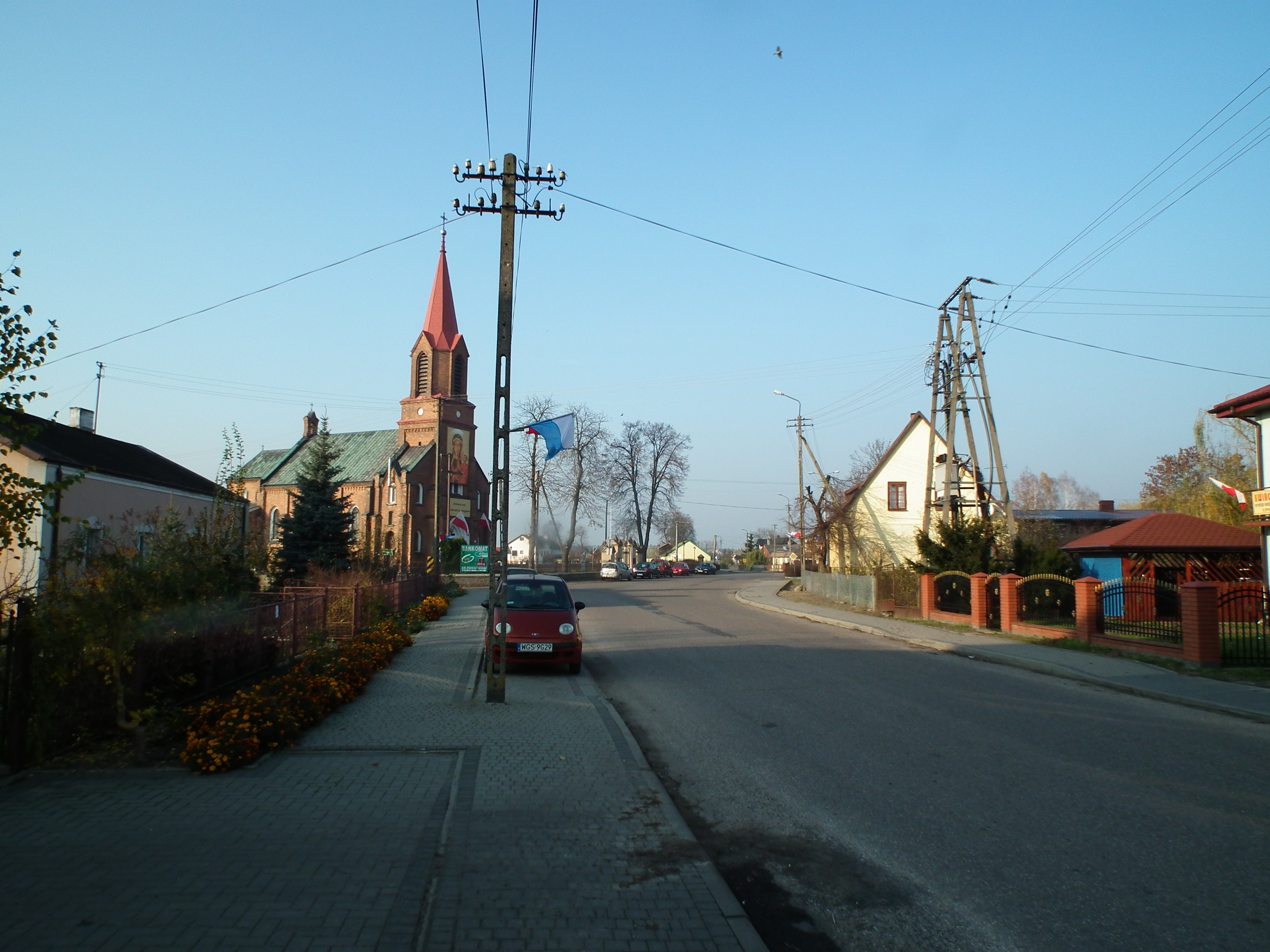

- Flag Coat of arms

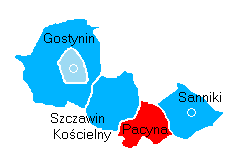
- Location within Gostynin County
- Coordinates (Pacyna): 52°17′59″N 19°42′45″E
- Country: Poland
- Voivodeship: Masovian
- County: Gostynin
- Seat: Pacyna

Area
  - Total: 90.85 km^{2} (35.08 sq mi)

Population (2017)
  - Total: 3,614
  - Density: 39.78/km^{2} (103.0/sq mi)
- Time zone: UTC+1 (CET)
  - Summer (DST): UTC+2 (CEST)
- Vehicle registration: WGS
- Website: http://www.pacyna.mazowsze.pl

Gmina Pacyna is a rural gmina (administrative district) in Gostynin County, Masovian Voivodeship, in central Poland. Its seat is the village of Pacyna, which lies approximately 22 kilometres (14 mi) south-east of Gostynin and 89 km (55 mi) west of Warsaw.

The gmina covers an area of 90.85 square kilometres (35.1 sq mi) and in 2017, its total population was 3,614. According to data from 2009, 84% of the area is agricultural land.

== Villages ==
Gmina Pacyna contains the villages and settlements of Anatolin, Janówek, Łuszczanówek, Luszyn, Model, Pacyna, Podatkówek, Podczachy, Przylaski, Radycza, Raków, Rakowiec, Remki, Robertów, Romanów, Rybie, Sejkowice, Skrzeszewy, Słomków, and Wola Pacyńska.

== Neighbouring gminas ==
Gmina Pacyna is bordered by the gminas of Gąbin, Kiernozia, Oporów, Sanniki, Szczawin Kościelny, and Żychlin.
