= Guta =

Guta may refer to:

- Guta (spirit), a demon from Hungarian mythology
- Guta Saga, a saga treating the history of Gotland before its Christianization
- Guta language, a Kainji language of Nigeria, Naraguta in Hausa

== Places ==
- Guta District, in Jinzhou, Liaoning, China
- Kolárovo, formerly named Guta, town in the south of Slovakia
- Guta raJehovah, or just Guta, a church in Zvimba, Zimbabwe,

== People ==
- Guta Stresser (born 1972), Brazilian television actress
- Nicolae Guţă (born 1967), Gypsy manele and jazz singer
- Gheorghe Tătărescu (1886–1957), Romanian prime minister, known as Guţă Tătărescu
- Judith of Habsburg (German: Guta von Habsburg) (1271–1297), queen of Bohemia and Poland

== See also ==
- Huta
