= Gmina Gostynin =

Gmina Gostynin Gostynin Commune
- Gmina
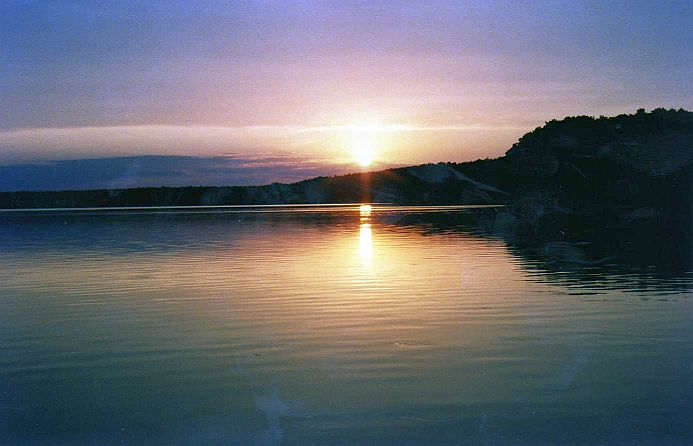

- Coat of arms

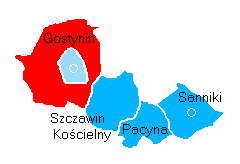
- Location within Gostynin County
- Coordinates (Gostynin): 52°25′N 19°28′E
- Country: Poland
- Voivodeship: Masovian
- County: Gostynin
- Seat: Gostynin

Area
  - Total: 270.69 km^{2} (104.51 sq mi)

Population (2006)
  - Total: 12,245
  - Density: 45.236/km^{2} (117.16/sq mi)
- Time zone: UTC+1 (CET)
  - Summer (DST): UTC+2 (CEST)
- Vehicle registration: WGS
- Website: https://web.archive.org/web/20040826063719/http://www.gmina.gostynin.pl:80/

Gmina Gostynin is a rural gmina (administrative district) in Gostynin County, Masovian Voivodeship, in central Poland. Its seat is the town of Gostynin, although the town is not part of the territory of the gmina.

The gmina covers an area of 270.69 square kilometres (104.5 sq mi), and as of 2006 its total population is 12,245.

The gmina contains part of the protected area called Gostynin-Włocławek Landscape Park.

== Villages ==
Gmina Gostynin contains the villages and settlements of:

- Aleksandrynów
- Anielin
- Antoninów
- Baby Dolne
- Baby Górne
- Belno
- Białe
- Białotarsk
- Bielawy
- Bierzewice
- Bolesławów
- Budy Kozickie
- Budy Lucieńskie
- Choinek
- Dąbrówka
- Emilianów
- Feliksów
- Gaśno
- Górki Drugie
- Górki Pierwsze
- Gorzewo
- Gulewo
- Halinów
- Helenów
- Huta Zaborowska
- Jaworek
- Józefków
- Kazimierzów
- Kiełpieniec
- Kleniew
- Klusek
- Kozice
- Krzywie
- Legarda
- Leśniewice
- Lipa
- Lisica
- Łokietnica
- Lucień
- Marianka
- Marianów
- Marianów Sierakowski
- Mysłownia Nowa
- Nagodów
- Niecki
- Nowa Huta
- Nowa Jastrzębia
- Nowa Wieś
- Nowy Zaborów
- Osada
- Osiny
- Podgórze
- Pomorzanki
- Rębów
- Rogożewek
- Rumunki
- Ruszków
- Rybne
- Sałki
- Sieraków
- Sierakówek
- Skrzany
- Sokołów
- Solec
- Stanisławów
- Stanisławów Skrzański
- Stary Zaborów
- Stefanów
- Strzałki
- Wrząca
- Zieleniec
- Zuzinów and Zwoleń

== Neighbouring gminas ==
Gmina Gostynin is bordered by the town of Gostynin and by the gminas of Baruchowo, Łąck, Łanięta, Lubień Kujawski, Nowy Duninów, Strzelce and Szczawin Kościelny.
