= Legarda, Navarre =

Municipality of Spain

Coordinates: 42.712°N 1.770°W

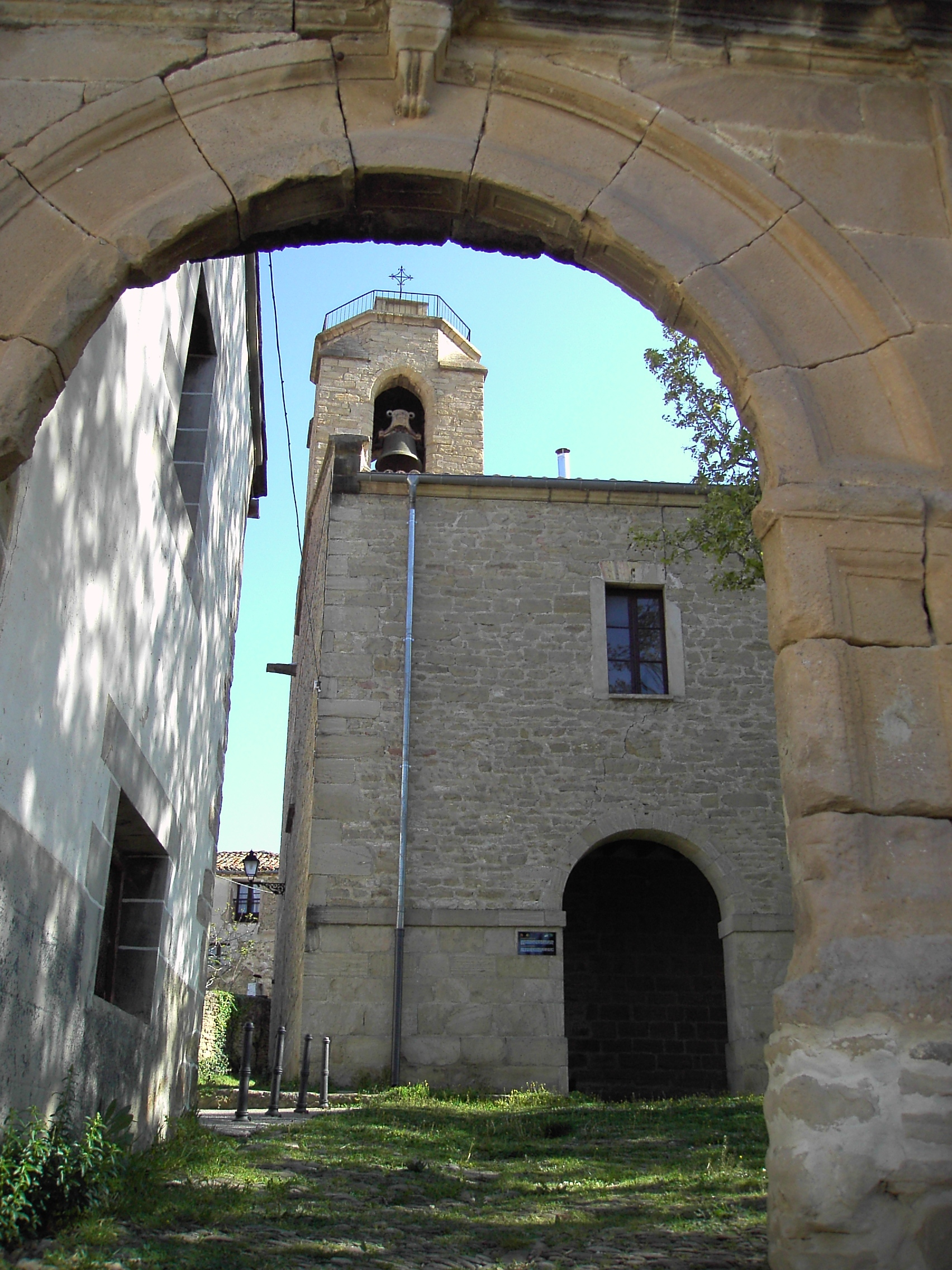
Legarda town church.

Legarda is a town and municipality located in the province and autonomous community of Navarre, northern Spain.
