= Legarda Ancestral House =

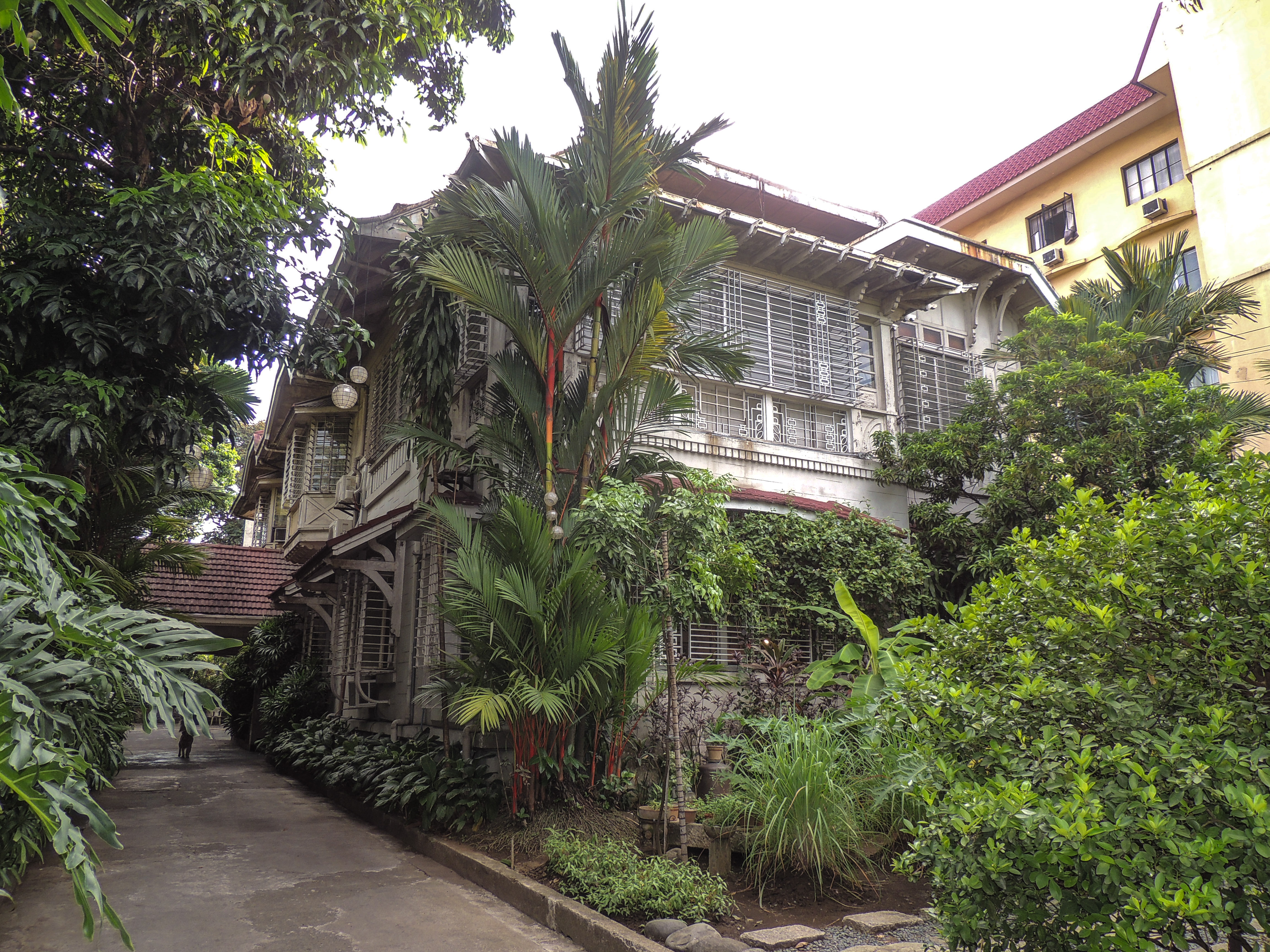
- Side view of the Legarda Mansion

- Location within Metro Manila

General information
- Location: 315 San Rafael Street, San Miguel, Manila, Philippines
- Coordinates: 14.596230°N 120.993822°E
- Construction started: 1937

The Legarda Ancestral House, or Legarda Mansion, is the home of Dr. Alejandro Legarda and Doña Ramona Hernandez. It is a historic house located in San Miguel, Manila, Philippines. It was one of the first Art Deco houses in Metro Manila built in 1937. In 2001, the house was converted into a restaurant called La Cocina de Tita Moning (lit. "The kitchen of Tita Moning", "Tita Moning" being the nickname of Doña Ramona Hernandez) as an adaptive reuse for the heritage structure. The restaurant closed in 2016.

== Location ==
The Legarda Ancestral House is located at 315 St. Rafael Street, San Miguel, Manila, beside what used to be the Malacaňang Clinic, which, in turn, used to be the home of General Basilio Valdes, the chief of the Armed Forces of the Philippines during the term of President Manuel L. Quezon.

== Historical background ==
=== The House ===
The Legarda Ancestral House was built in 1937 and was among the first Art deco houses built in Manila. The houses flanking on both sides of the Legarda Ancestral House and the other houses on the street belongs to the other members of the Legarda-Valdes-Prieto clan.

The house at 315 San Rafael St. belongs to the family of Dr. Alejandro Legarda, his wife Ramona, and their four children, Filomena, Carmen, Alejandro, and Ramon.

Casa Rita is still owned by the Valdes-Araneta clan, but the house of General Basilio Valdes was sold a long time ago and was made into the Malacaňang Clinic and is currently the home of Malacaňang Palace's Presidential guards.

== Features ==
The Zalameda

Upon entering the main door you will find the Zalameda at the left wall of the house. It is where the painting "Sailboats" of Filipino artist Oscar Zalameda is placed. The painting was bought by Mr. Ramon H. Legarda circa 1970's for only 3,000 pesos.

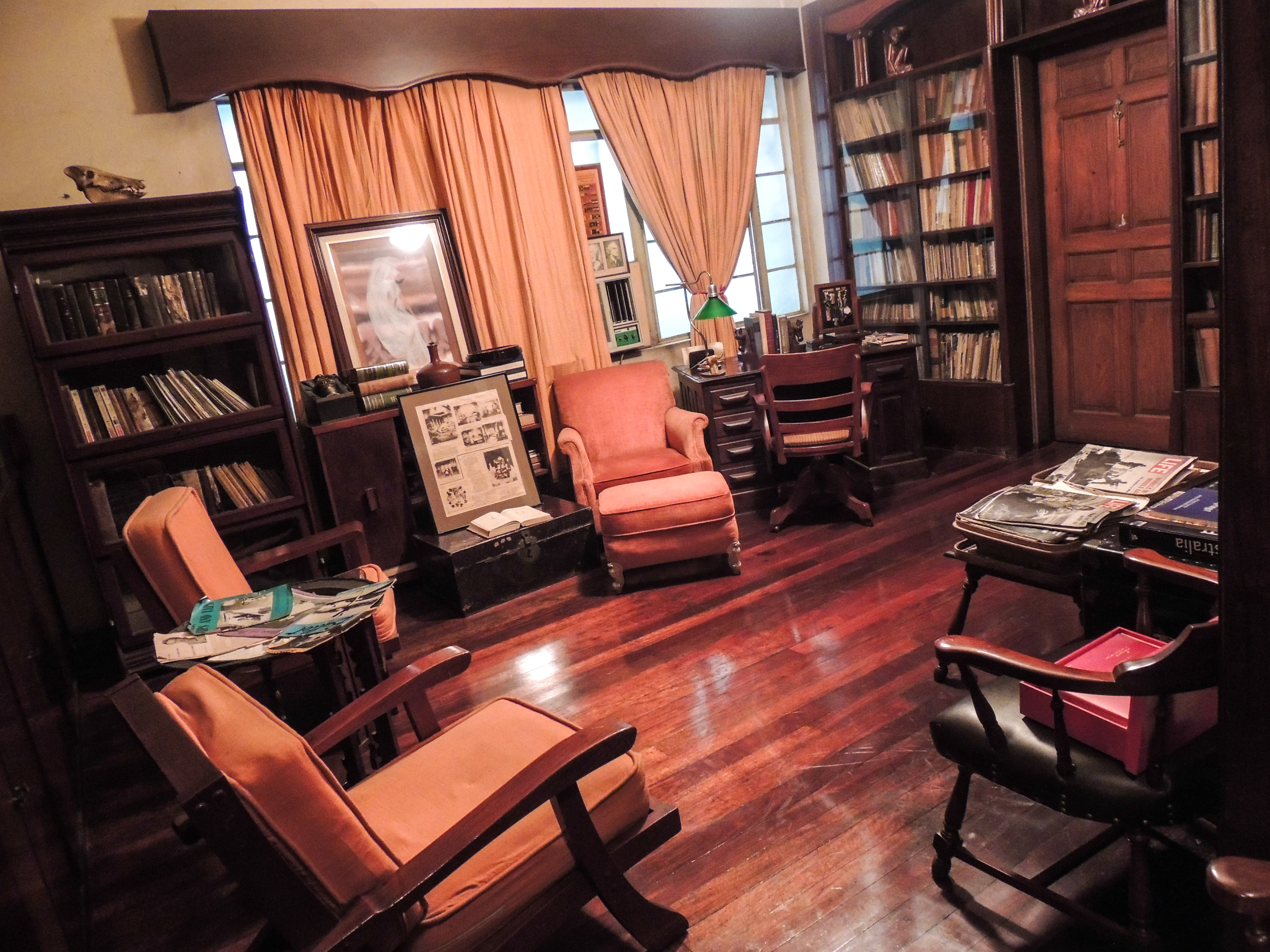
The Library

The Library

Being a doctor, Dr. Legarda had his own collection of medical books and encyclopedias placed on the house's library. Inside the library there are still two other rooms, the small door behind the chest was his dark room and the other one served as a guest room for family guests and relatives.

The Antique Camera Equipment room

Left of the stairs, down the hall to the right is where the antique cameras and equipment used by Dr. Legarda before is displayed. He was recognized as the oldest living member of the "Camera Club of the Philippines" at the time of his death in 1993.

The Clinic

Dr. Legarda was an OB Gynecologist by profession and had set up his own clinic in the house. Currently, the clinic still has the x-ray machine and the skeleton used by Dr. Alejandro in Medical school. The clinic is located across the antique camera equipment room.

The Living Room

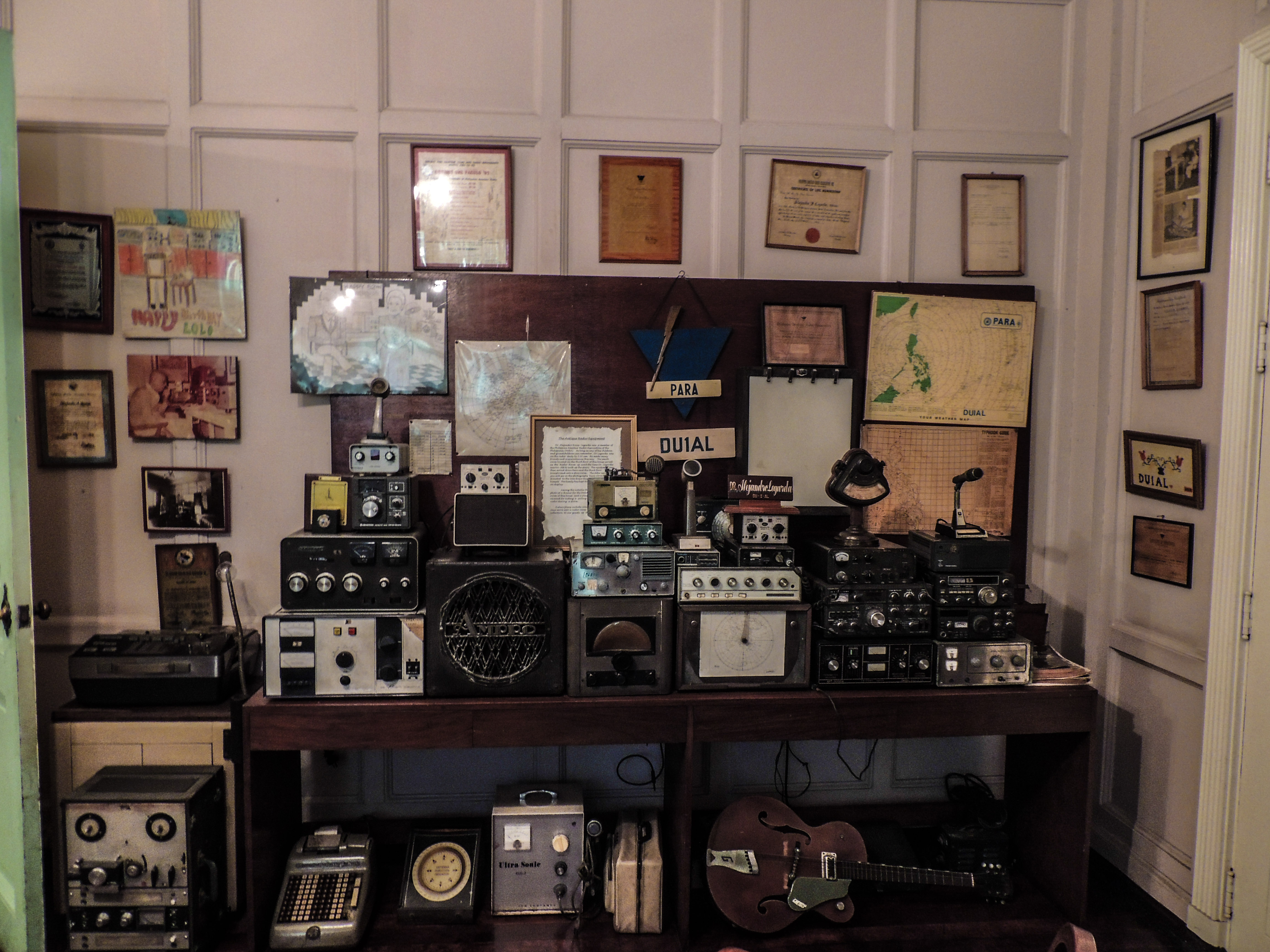
The Radio Equipment Room

Located upstairs on the left of the house's second floor is the family's living room. It houses the painting of National Artist Félix Ressurección Hidalgo entitled "La Inocencia" and an original work of National Artist Juan Luna.

The Antique Radio Equipment Room

Dr. Alejandro was not only an OB Gynecologist and a photographer; he was also an amateur radio operator. Being an avid member of the Philippine Amateur Radio Association, he has a room for all of his radio equipment that was placed on the third floor before but later on transferred at the room to the left of the living room of the house.

The Dining Room

Located just across the living room is the dining room decorated with a collection of China custom-made blue Meissen plates hanging on the wall.

== La Cocina de Tita Moning ==
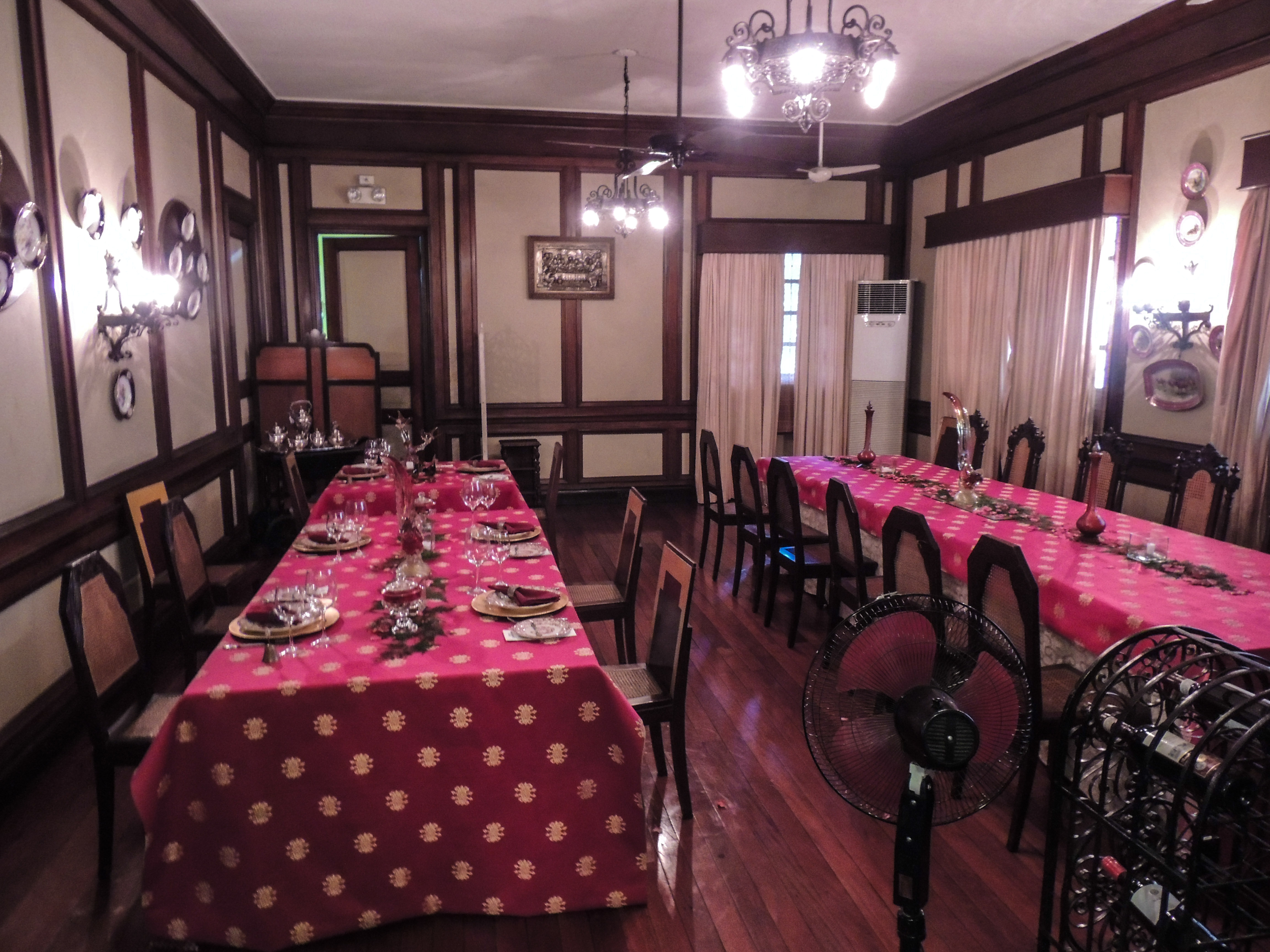
Currently, it is called La Cocina de Tita Moning

In 2001 the ancestral house was turned into a restaurant called "La Cocina de Tita Moning", named after Doña Ramona Hernandez. The restaurant featured her specialty dishes along with those by Chef Suzette Montinola, the granddaughter of Dr. Alejandro Roces Legarda and Doña Ramona, who also managed the establishment.

The restaurant's dishes were of Spanish influence, but there were also Filipino classics with their modern twist. Clients were not only offered an experience to dine in the style of the late 19th century but also got to have a tour of the house before their meal.

The restaurant did not accept walk-in guests and only entertained those with reservations made 24 hours before.

La Cocina de Tita Moning permanently closed in 2016.
