= Lisca (hill) =

Coordinates: 46°4′4.66″N 15°17′5.25″E

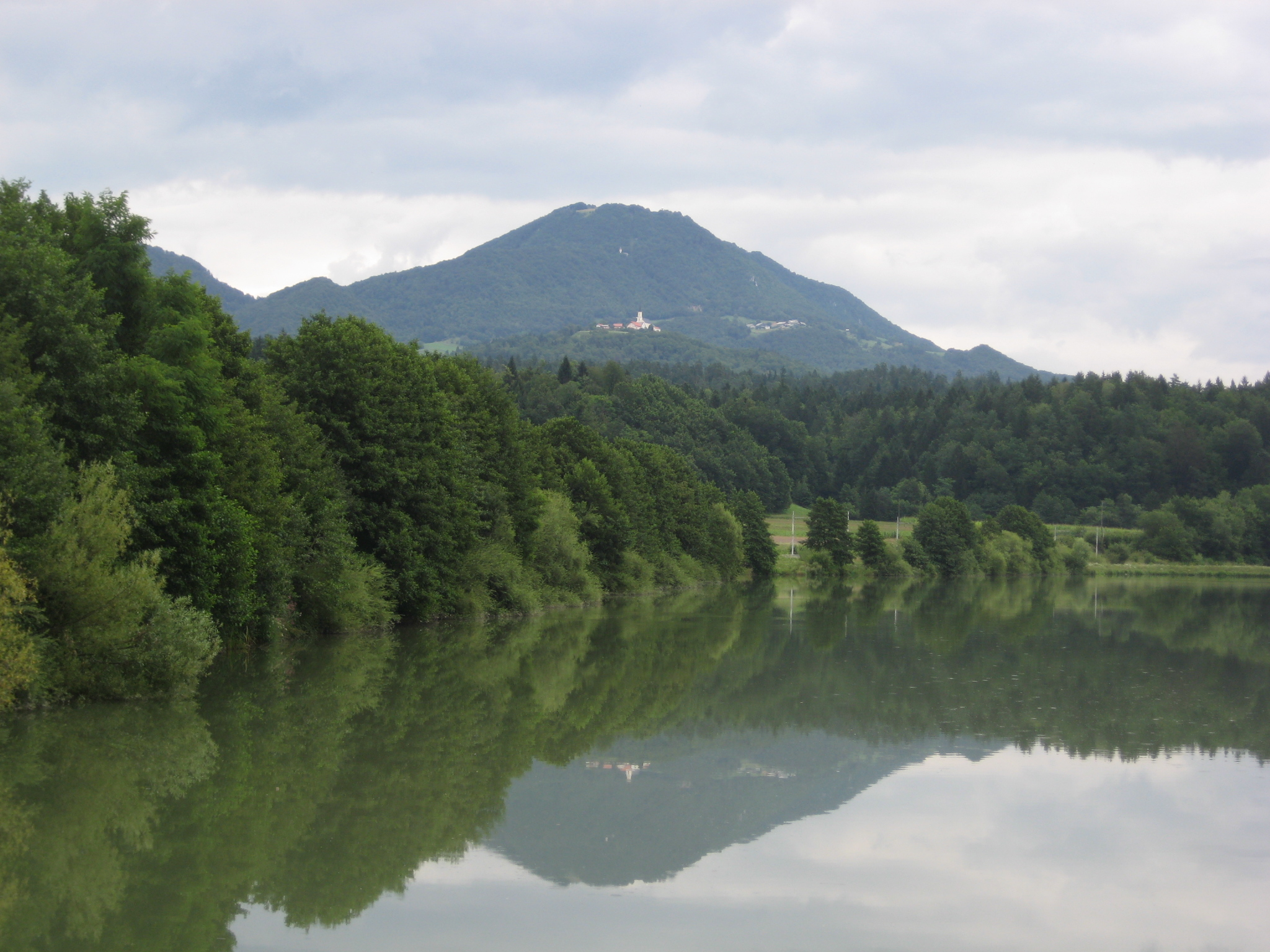
- Lisca behind the village of Razbor, viewed from the Vrhovo hydroelectric plant

Geography
- Location within Slovenia
- Location: Sava Hills
- Country: Slovenia
- Parent range: Slovene Prealps

Lisca (pronounced [ˈliːstsa]) is a 948-metre (3,110 ft) hill in the eastern part of the Sava Hills in southeastern Slovenia, northwest of Sevnica, north of the Sava, and south of Gračnica Creek. It is the most frequently visited hiking destination in the Sava Hills.

== Etymology ==
The name Lisca comes from *lysъ 'bald'.

== Geography ==
The hill has two summits: Lisca and Little Lisca (Slovene: Mala Lisca; 934 metres or 3,064 feet). At Lisca there is a meteorological station, the only one in Slovenia with a meteorological radar, and a ski slope. At Mala Lisca, there are three paragliding take-off sites.

At 927 metres (3,041 ft), the Jurko Lodge (Jurkova koča) stands below the peak, built in 1972 at the site of the previous structures. It is named after Blaž Jurko (1859–1944), an early teacher and hiking pioneer that built the first hut on Lisca in 1902. Next to it stands the Tonček Lodge (Tončkov dom), built in 1952 after the old one was burned during World War II by the Partisans. It was named after Tonček Čebular, the president of the Lisca Sevnica Mountaineering Club, who led the rebuilding. Below the Tonček Lodge there is a chapel dedicated to the Mother of God, built in 1939 at the initiative of Blaž Jurko. Six names are written on plaques around its door: the nieces and nephews of the priest that consecrated it.

=== Weather station ===
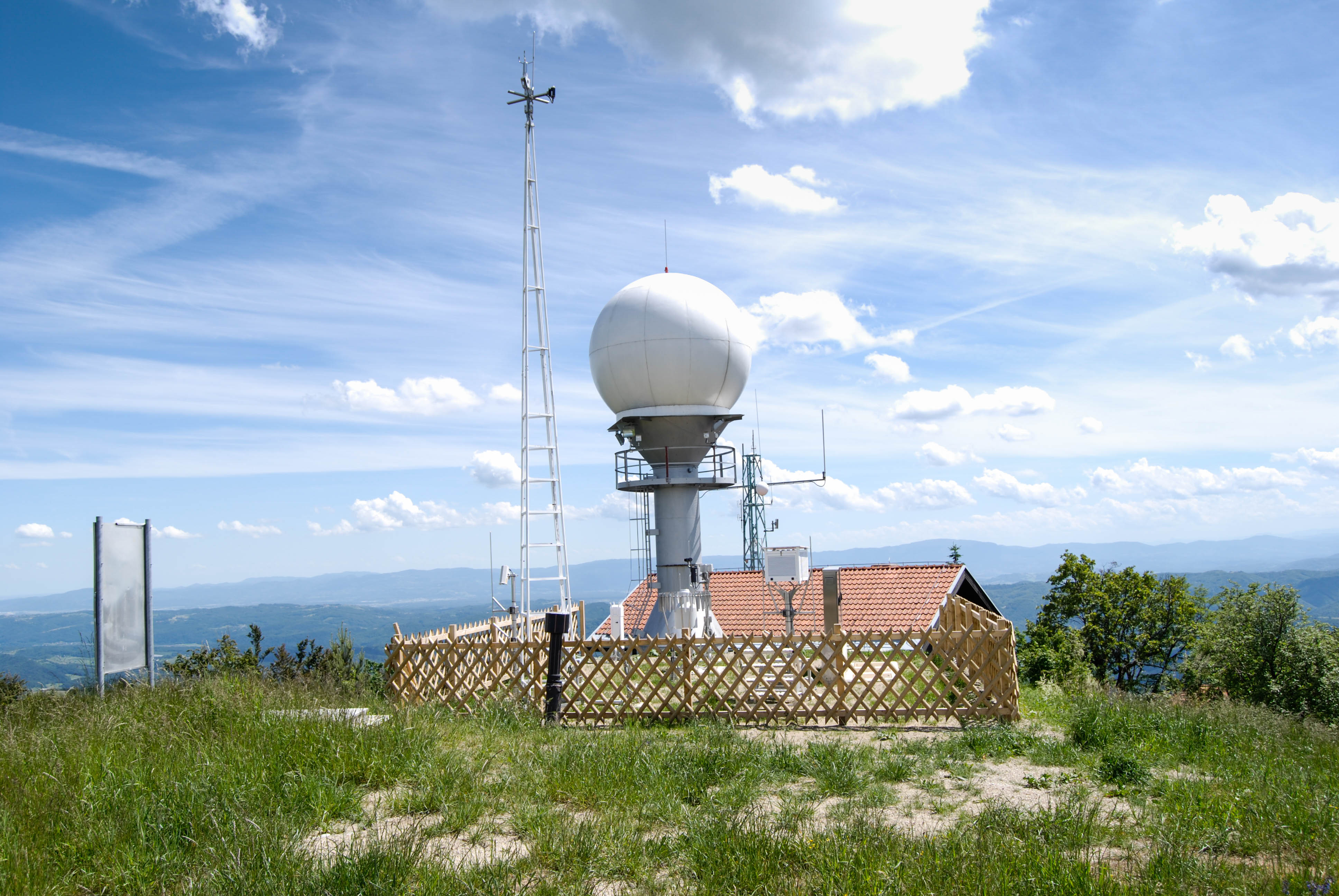
The Lisca Meteorological Radar Centre on Mount Lisca

The Slovenian Environment Agency combines data from Meteosat and the meteorological radar at Lisca for accurate precipitation forecasts. The radar has a measuring distance of 200 kilometres (120 mi).

Climate data for Lisca 1981-2010 (947m)
| Month | Jan | Feb | Mar | Apr | May | Jun | Jul | Aug | Sep | Oct | Nov | Dec | Year |
|---|---|---|---|---|---|---|---|---|---|---|---|---|---|
| Mean daily maximum °C (°F) | 0.7 (33.3) | 1.7 (35.1) | 5.8 (42.4) | 10.8 (51.4) | 15.8 (60.4) | 18.6 (65.5) | 21.1 (70.0) | 20.8 (69.4) | 16.0 (60.8) | 11.2 (52.2) | 5.3 (41.5) | 1.6 (34.9) | 10.8 (51.4) |
| Daily mean °C (°F) | −1.7 (28.9) | −0.9 (30.4) | 2.4 (36.3) | 6.7 (44.1) | 11.6 (52.9) | 14.5 (58.1) | 16.8 (62.2) | 16.6 (61.9) | 12.4 (54.3) | 8.0 (46.4) | 2.8 (37.0) | −0.7 (30.7) | 7.4 (45.3) |
| Mean daily minimum °C (°F) | −4.0 (24.8) | −3.3 (26.1) | −0.4 (31.3) | 3.6 (38.5) | 8.4 (47.1) | 11.2 (52.2) | 13.5 (56.3) | 13.5 (56.3) | 9.7 (49.5) | 5.7 (42.3) | 0.7 (33.3) | −2.7 (27.1) | 4.7 (40.4) |
| Average precipitation mm (inches) | 48 (1.9) | 57 (2.2) | 74 (2.9) | 80 (3.1) | 106 (4.2) | 137 (5.4) | 112 (4.4) | 129 (5.1) | 123 (4.8) | 115 (4.5) | 90 (3.5) | 73 (2.9) | 1,144 (44.9) |
| Average extreme snow depth cm (inches) | 14 (5.5) | 19 (7.5) | 12 (4.7) | 1 (0.4) | 0 (0) | 0 (0) | 0 (0) | 0 (0) | 0 (0) | 0 (0) | 4 (1.6) | 11 (4.3) | 5.2 (2.0) |
Source: Slovenian Environment Agency (ARSO)

Climate data for Lisca (945m elev.) [1984-2022]
| Month | Jan | Feb | Mar | Apr | May | Jun | Jul | Aug | Sep | Oct | Nov | Dec | Year |
|---|---|---|---|---|---|---|---|---|---|---|---|---|---|
| Record high °C (°F) | 15.6 (60.1) | 18.0 (64.4) | 20.4 (68.7) | 24.6 (76.3) | 26.8 (80.2) | 30.0 (86.0) | 32.2 (90.0) | 34.8 (94.6) | 27.0 (80.6) | 22.1 (71.8) | 20.0 (68.0) | 15.7 (60.3) | 34.8 (94.6) |
| Mean daily maximum °C (°F) | 1.42 (34.56) | 2.61 (36.70) | 6.64 (43.95) | 11.62 (52.92) | 16.06 (60.91) | 19.46 (67.03) | 21.64 (70.95) | 21.54 (70.77) | 16.51 (61.72) | 11.63 (52.93) | 6.12 (43.02) | 2.39 (36.30) | 11.47 (52.65) |
| Daily mean °C (°F) | −1.22 (29.80) | −0.42 (31.24) | 2.79 (37.02) | 7.18 (44.92) | 11.64 (52.95) | 15.15 (59.27) | 17.27 (63.09) | 17.17 (62.91) | 12.62 (54.72) | 8.23 (46.81) | 3.32 (37.98) | −0.14 (31.75) | 7.80 (46.04) |
| Mean daily minimum °C (°F) | −3.47 (25.75) | −2.82 (26.92) | −0.02 (31.96) | 4.01 (39.22) | 8.45 (47.21) | 11.87 (53.37) | 13.89 (57.00) | 13.99 (57.18) | 9.98 (49.96) | 5.93 (42.67) | 1.29 (34.32) | −2.3 (27.9) | 5.07 (41.12) |
| Record low °C (°F) | −20.5 (−4.9) | −18.5 (−1.3) | −15.8 (3.6) | −7.6 (18.3) | −1.7 (28.9) | 1.6 (34.9) | 5.5 (41.9) | 3.8 (38.8) | 0.7 (33.3) | −7.2 (19.0) | −13.0 (8.6) | −18.0 (−0.4) | −20.5 (−4.9) |
| Average precipitation mm (inches) | 49.55 (1.95) | 62.25 (2.45) | 65.22 (2.57) | 83.42 (3.28) | 111.91 (4.41) | 125.59 (4.94) | 113.13 (4.45) | 119.37 (4.70) | 133.14 (5.24) | 114.58 (4.51) | 101.52 (4.00) | 68.45 (2.69) | 1,148.13 (45.19) |
| Average extreme snow depth cm (inches) | 31.25 (12.30) | 41.08 (16.17) | 35.19 (13.85) | 12.79 (5.04) | 4.62 (1.82) | 0.0 (0.0) | 0.0 (0.0) | 0.0 (0.0) | 0.0 (0.0) | 6.73 (2.65) | 20.55 (8.09) | 33.34 (13.13) | 41.08 (16.17) |
| Average precipitation days (≥ 0.1 mm) | 10.34 | 9.92 | 11.16 | 13.63 | 14.42 | 14.28 | 12.16 | 11.32 | 11.95 | 11.37 | 13.24 | 11.39 | 145.18 |
| Average rainy days (≥ 0.1 mm) | 4.11 | 4.29 | 6.11 | 12.08 | 14.39 | 14.28 | 12.16 | 11.32 | 11.95 | 10.97 | 10.35 | 5.97 | 117.98 |
| Average snowy days (≥ 0.1 mm) | 7.39 | 6.89 | 6.45 | 3.11 | 0.37 | 0.05 | 0.0 | 0.0 | 0.0 | 0.87 | 4.27 | 7.11 | 36.51 |
| Average relative humidity (%) | 81.37 | 77.82 | 73.18 | 70.11 | 72.68 | 74.64 | 72.05 | 72.92 | 80.21 | 83.82 | 85.51 | 82.66 | 77.25 |
| Average afternoon relative humidity (%) | 78.32 | 73.05 | 65.29 | 61.79 | 65.18 | 68.51 | 66.03 | 66.08 | 73.42 | 77.32 | 81.16 | 80.05 | 71.35 |
| Mean monthly sunshine hours | 101.98 | 116.66 | 154.03 | 181.09 | 225.52 | 246.84 | 282.65 | 263.17 | 188.02 | 143.46 | 93.2 | 93.77 | 2,090.39 |
Source: National Meteorological Service of Slovenia – Archive

== Ascent routes ==
The main path leading to the top is the Jurko Trail, named after Blaž Jurko. It leads from the village of Breg (220 metres or 720 feet) through the village of Razbor to the top of Lisca. An asphalt road leads to the Tonček Lodge from a pass (676 metres or 2,218 feet) between the Sava and Gračnica valleys.

The Jurko Trail also leads past a church dedicated to St. Judoc (Slovene: sveti Jošt; 788 metres or 2,585 feet) on the western slope of Lisca. There, three paths leading to the top join. An auction of pork hocks and cured sausage has taken place at St. Judoc's Church every Shrove Sunday since 1997, reviving a tradition that had disappeared for a period.

== Other uses ==
The company Lisca, a major lingerie manufacturer, is named after the hill.
