= Tomasz Jaworek =

Polish association football player

Personal information
- Date of birth: 14 February 1970 (age 56)
- Place of birth: Mikołów, Poland
- Height: 1.82 m (6 ft 0 in)
- Position: Striker

Youth career
- 1982–1987: AKS Mikołów

Senior career*
Years	Team	Apps	(Gls)
1988	Gwarek Zabrze		
1988–1989	Concordia Knurów		
1989	GKS Tychy		
1990–1992	Ruch Chorzów	62	(8)
1992–1993	Mainz 05	22	(2)
1993	Víkingur	8	(3)
1994–1995	Paderborn	12	(2)
1995–1996	Śląsk Wrocław	16	(1)
1997	Szombierki Bytom		
1997	Energie Cottbus	2	(0)
1998	Olimpia Piekary Śląskie		
1998–1999	FC 08 Homburg	26	(6)
1999	Carl Zeiss Jena	8	(0)
2005	LKS 45 Bujaków		
- * Club domestic league appearances and goals

Tomasz Jaworek (born 14 February 1970) is a Polish former professional footballer who played as a striker.

== Career ==
Jaworek started his career with Polish lower league side AKS Mikołów. Before the second half of the 1989–90 season, Jaworek moved to Ruch Chorzów in the Polish top flight, where he made 62 league appearances and scored 8 goals. In 1992, he signed for German second tier club Mainz 05. In 1993, Jaworek signed for Víkingur in Iceland, becoming the first Polish player in Iceland. In 1994, he signed for German third tier team Paderborn. In 1995, he joined Śląsk Wrocław in the Polish top flight.

Before the second half of the 1996–97 season, Jaworek signed for Polish lower league outfit Szombierki Bytom. In 1997, he joined Energie Cottbus in the German second tier. In early 1998, he signed for Polish lower league side Olimpia Piekary Śląskie. In 1998, Jaworek moved to FC 08 Homburg in the German third tier. In 2005, he signed for Polish seventh tier club LKS 45 Bujaków.
