= Gostynin County =

Gostynin County Powiat gostyniński
- County
- Flag Coat of arms

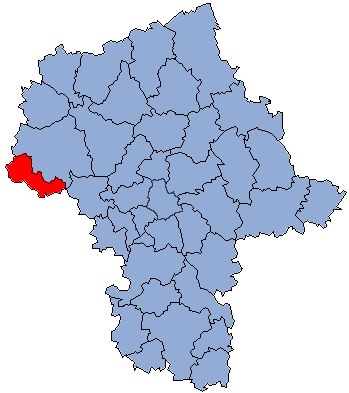
- Location within the voivodeship

- Division into gminas
- Coordinates (Gostynin): 52°25′N 19°28′E
- Country: Poland
- Voivodeship: Masovian
- Seat: Gostynin
- Gminas: Total 5 (incl. 1 urban): Gostynin; Gmina Gostynin; Gmina Pacyna; Gmina Sanniki; Gmina Szczawin Kościelny

Area
  - Total: 615.56 km^{2} (237.67 sq mi)

Population (2019)
  - Total: 43,099
  - Density: 70.016/km^{2} (181.34/sq mi)
  - Urban: 18,588
  - Rural: 24,511
- Time zone: UTC+1 (CET)
  - Summer (DST): UTC+2 (CEST)
- Car plates: WGS
- Website: gostynin.powiat.pl

Gostynin County (Polish: powiat gostyniński) is a unit of territorial administration and local government (powiat) in Masovian Voivodeship, central Poland. It came into being on January 1, 1999, as a result of the Polish local government reforms passed in 1998. Its administrative seat and largest town is Gostynin, which lies 107 kilometres (66 mi) west of Warsaw. Its only other town is Sanniki.

The county covers an area of 615.56 square kilometres (237.7 sq mi). As of 2019, its total population was 43,099, out of which the population of Gostynin was 18,588, and the rural population was 24,511.

== Neighbouring counties ==
Gostynin County is bordered by Płock County to the north-east, Sochaczew County to the east, Łowicz County to the south-east, Kutno County to the south and Włocławek County to the north-west.

== Administrative divisions ==
The county is subdivided into five gminas (one urban, one urban-rural and three rural). These are listed in the following table, in descending order of population.

Gmina	Type	Area (km^{2})	Population (2019)	Seat
Gostynin	urban	32.3	18,588	
Gmina Gostynin	rural	270.7	12,066	Gostynin *
Gmina Szczawin Kościelny	rural	127.1	4,866	Szczawin Kościelny
Gmina Sanniki	urban-rural	94.6	4,056	Sanniki
Gmina Pacyna	rural	90.9	3,523	Pacyna
* seat not part of the gmina
