= Biale =

Biale is the surname of the following notable people:

- Davide Biale (born 1994), Italian musician and YouTuber known as Davie504
- David Biale (1949–2024), American historian
- Rachel Biale (born 1952), Israeli-American author, wife of David

== See also ==
- Białe (disambiguation)
