= Białe =

Białe may refer to the following places:

- Białe, Kuyavian-Pomeranian Voivodeship, in north-central Poland
- Białe, Masovian Voivodeship, in east-central Poland
- Białe, Podlaskie Voivodeship, in northeast Poland
- Białe, West Pomeranian Voivodeship, in northwest Poland
- Bielsko-Biała, Silesian Voivodeship, in southern Poland

== See also ==
- Białe Jezioro (disambiguation), various lakes in Poland
- Jezioro Białe (disambiguation), various lakes in Poland
