= Marcin Wodziński =

Polish historian

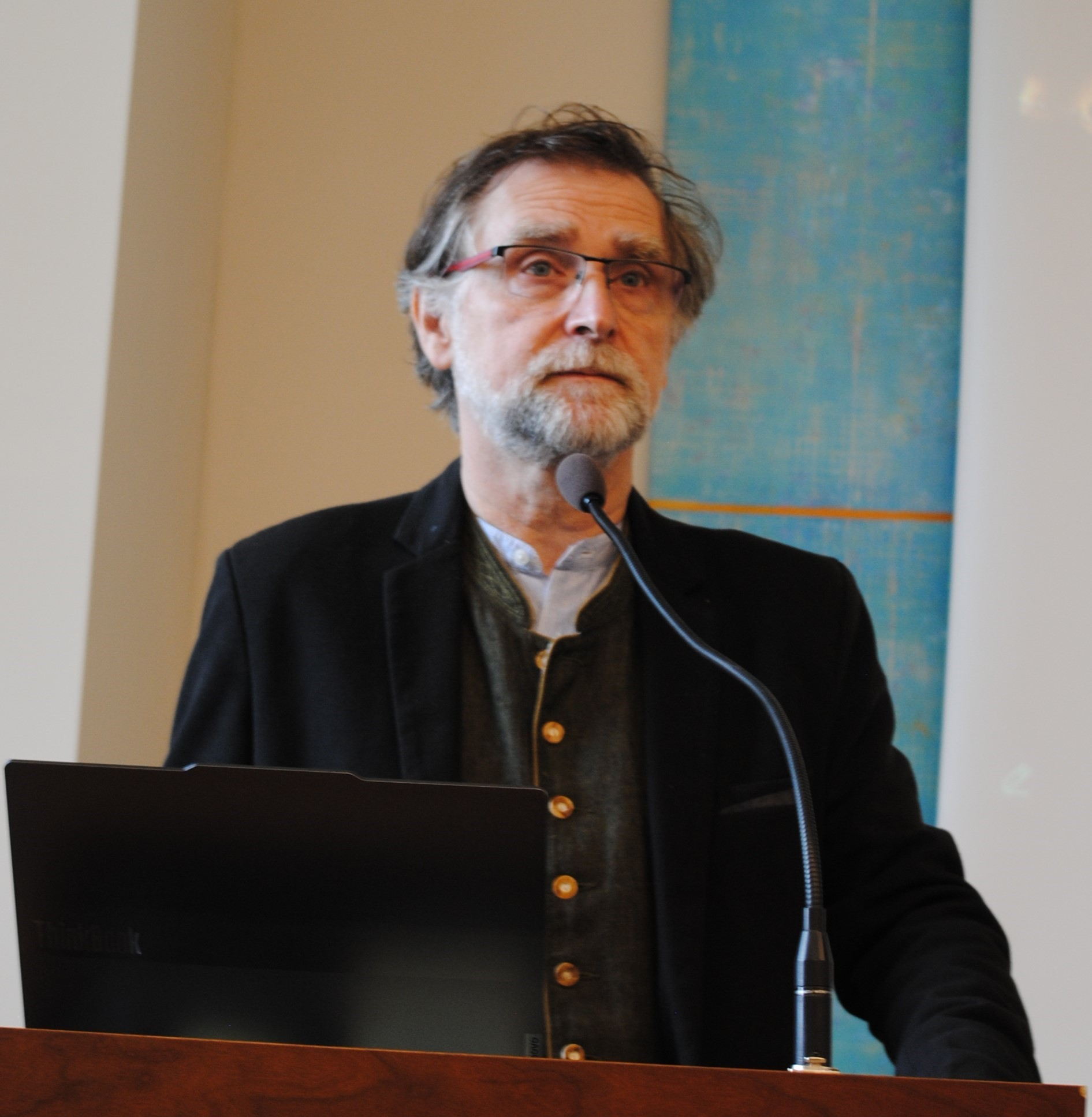
- Born: Marcin Wodziński; 30 May 1966 (age 60); Świdnica, województwo dolnośląskie, Poland
- Awards: Łukasz Hirszowicz Award (2008), Jan Karski and Pola Nirenska Prize (2011), National Jewish Book Award (2018) (for the Historical Atlas of Hasidism), Irena Sendlerowa Memorial Award (2023)

Academic background
- Education: University of Wrocław
- Thesis: Hebrew Inscriptions in Silesia 13th–18th Century (1995)
- Doctoral advisor: Jerzy Woronczak

Academic work
- Discipline: history, Jewish studies
- Institutions: University of Wrocław
- Main interests: 19th century history of Polish Jews, Haskalah, Hasidism, Hebrew epigraphy
- Notable works: Historical Atlas of Hasidism, Hasidism: A New History, Hasidism: Key Questions

Marcin Wodziński is a professor of Jewish studies at the University of Wrocław, where he heads the Taube Department of Jewish studies. His research is centered on the 19th century social history of Jews in Silesia and Eastern Europe (chiefly the areas that had historically comprised Poland), and particularly on Haskalah and the Hasidic movement within Judaism.

He has employed both qualitative as well as geospatial and quantitative methods in his study of Hasidism playing a pioneering role in the understanding of geographic factors in its development in former Poland and Eastern Europe. This approach features notably in his Historical Atlas of Hasidism, complemented by his other closely interrelated books on the movement's history in the context of wider socio-historical processes in the region: with Hasidism: Key Questions, Hasidism: A New History (co-authored) and Studying Hasidism: Sources, Methods, Perspectives (co-edited).

His interest in digital methods in humanities resulted also in his contributions to several projects, among others to the Yerusha project, where Wodziński was responsible for the Polish section, and to several ongoing projects focused on the collection, analysis and publication of data along with tools for digital historical analysis, in cooperation with several universities in Israel (Bar Ilan, Haifa University, Open University of Israel) and Toronto University.

He was the editor-in-chief of the biannual of the Polish Association of Jewish Studies, Studia Judaica in the years 2009–2018 and, since 2021, he has served as the editor-in-chief of the European Journal of Jewish Studies, published by the European Association for Jewish Studies.

Wodziński worked as a historical consultant at the POLIN Museum of the History of Polish Jews in Warsaw, Poland in the years 2000–2014, for two of which he was the museum's senior historian (2010–2012). He was the head of the team responsible for the 19th century section of the permanent exhibition. Since then, he has been a member of the museum's Historical Committee.

He is a member of the Academia Europaea and the Polish Academy of Sciences.

== Books ==
- Hebrew Inscriptions in Silesia 13th – 18th Century (1996)
- Graves of Zaddikim in Poland. On the Funeral Literature of Hasidim and its Contexts (1998)
- Jewish Cemetery in Lesko. Part 1: 16th and 17th Centuries (co-authored with Andrzej Trzciński) (2002)
- Bibliography on the History of Silesian Jewry II (2004)
- Haskalah and Hasidism in the Kingdom of Poland: A History of Conflict (2005)
- Judaica in the archival collection of the Central Religious Authorities of the Kingdom of Poland: Archival guide (2010)
- Hasidism in the Kingdom of Poland, 1815–1867: Historical Sources in the Polish State Archives (2011)
- Hasidism and Politics: The Kingdom of Poland, 1815–1864 (2013)
- Historical Atlas of Hasidism (with cartography by Waldemar Spallek) (2018), Princeton University Press
- Hasidism: Key Questions (2018) Oxford University Press
- Hasidism: A New History (co-authored with David Assaf, David Biale, Benjamin Brown, Uriel Gellman, Samuel Heilman, Moshe Rosman, Gad Sagiv) (2018) Princeton University Press

== See also ==
- Moshe Rosman
- Heinrich Graetz
- Simon Dubnow
- Salo W. Baron
