= Belno =

Belno may refer to the following places:

- Belno, Kuyavian-Pomeranian Voivodeship (north-central Poland)
- Belno, Gmina Bieliny in Świętokrzyskie Voivodeship (south-central Poland)
- Belno, Gmina Zagnańsk in Świętokrzyskie Voivodeship (south-central Poland)
- Belno, Masovian Voivodeship (east-central Poland)
