= Huta Podłysica =

- Village
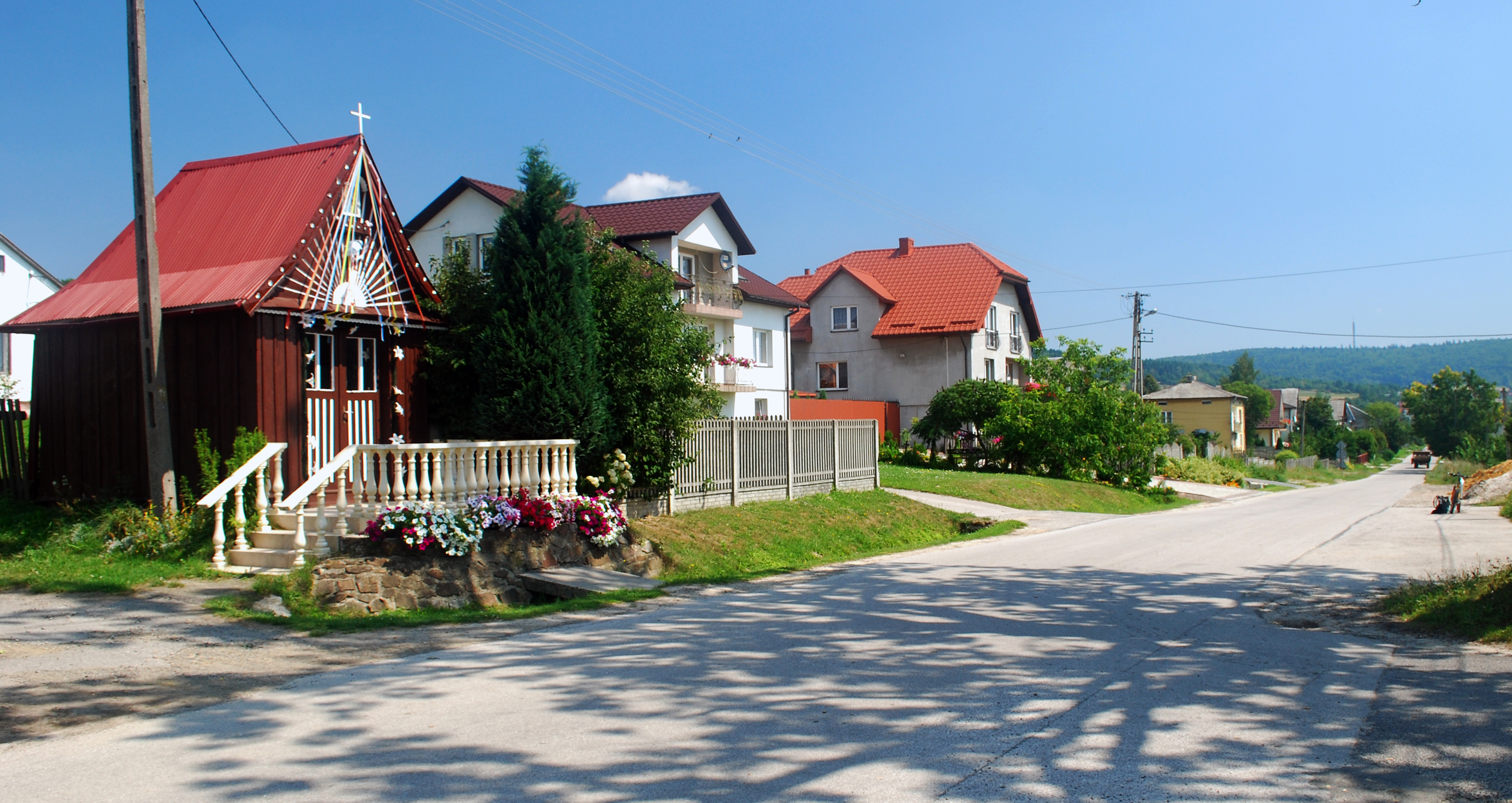

- Location within Poland
- Coordinates: 50°51′32″N 20°59′13″E
- Country: Poland
- Voivodeship: Świętokrzyskie
- County: Kielce
- Gmina: Bieliny
- Population: 590

Huta Podłysica [ˈxuta pɔdwɨˈɕit͡sa] is a village in the administrative district of Gmina Bieliny, within Kielce County, Świętokrzyskie Voivodeship, in south-central Poland. It lies approximately 6 km (4 mi) east of Bieliny and 27 km (17 mi) east of the regional capital Kielce.
