= Bieliny Poduchowne =

- Village
- Location within Poland
- Coordinates: 50°51′2″N 20°57′2″E
- Country: Poland
- Voivodeship: Świętokrzyskie
- County: Kielce
- Gmina: Bieliny
- Population: 1,000

Bieliny Poduchowne [bjɛˈlinɨ pɔduˈxɔvnɛ] is a village in the administrative district of Gmina Bieliny, within Kielce County, Świętokrzyskie Voivodeship, in south-central Poland. It lies approximately 3 km (2 mi) east of Bieliny and 24 km (15 mi) east of the regional capital Kielce.
