= Stara Huta-Koszary =

- Village
- Location within Poland
- Coordinates: 50°50′9″N 21°0′24″E
- Country: Poland
- Voivodeship: Świętokrzyskie
- County: Kielce
- Gmina: Bieliny
- Population: 220

Stara Huta-Koszary [ˈstara ˈxuta kɔˈʂarɨ] is a village in the administrative district of Gmina Bieliny, within Kielce County, Świętokrzyskie Voivodeship, in south-central Poland. It lies approximately 8 km (5 mi) east of Bieliny and 28 km (17 mi) east of the regional capital Kielce.
