= Stara Huta, Świętokrzyskie Voivodeship =

Stara Huta
- Village
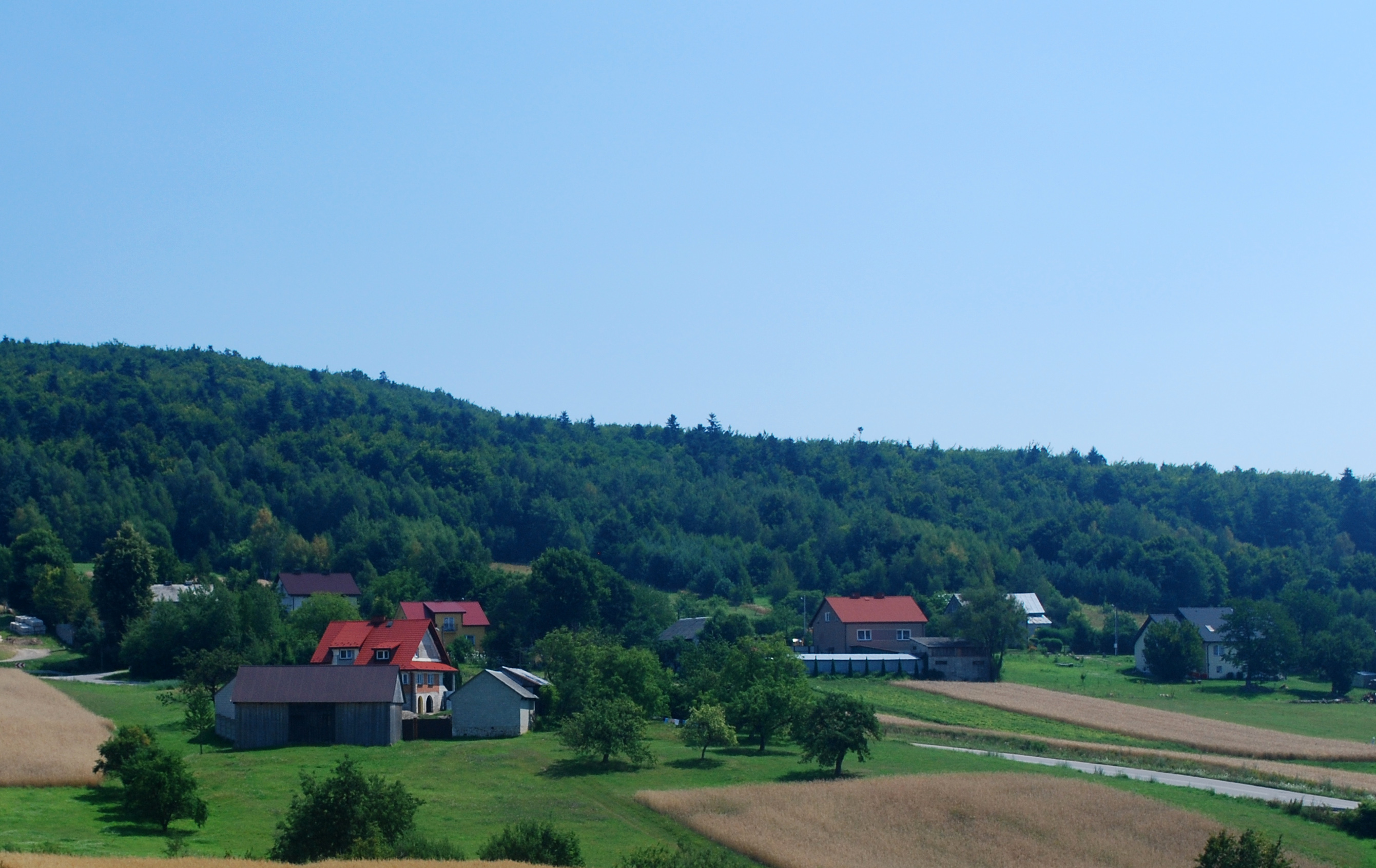
- Huta Stara

- Location within Poland
- Coordinates: 50°51′1″N 21°0′39″E
- Country: Poland
- Voivodeship: Świętokrzyskie
- County: Kielce
- Gmina: Bieliny
- Population: 370

Stara Huta [ˈstara ˈxuta] is a village in the administrative district of Gmina Bieliny, within Kielce County, Świętokrzyskie Voivodeship, in south-central Poland. It lies approximately 8 km (5 mi) east of Bieliny and 28 km (17 mi) east of the regional capital Kielce.
