= Huta Nowa, Gmina Bieliny =

Huta Nowa
- Village
- Location within Poland
- Coordinates: 50°50′36″N 20°58′58″E
- Country: Poland
- Voivodeship: Świętokrzyskie
- County: Kielce
- Gmina: Bieliny
- Population: 1,000

Huta Nowa [ˈxuta-'nɔva] is a village in the administrative district of Gmina Bieliny, within Kielce County, Świętokrzyskie Voivodeship, in south-central Poland. It lies approximately 6 km (4 mi) east of Bieliny and 27 km (17 mi) east of the regional capital Kielce.
