= Górki Napękowskie =

- Village
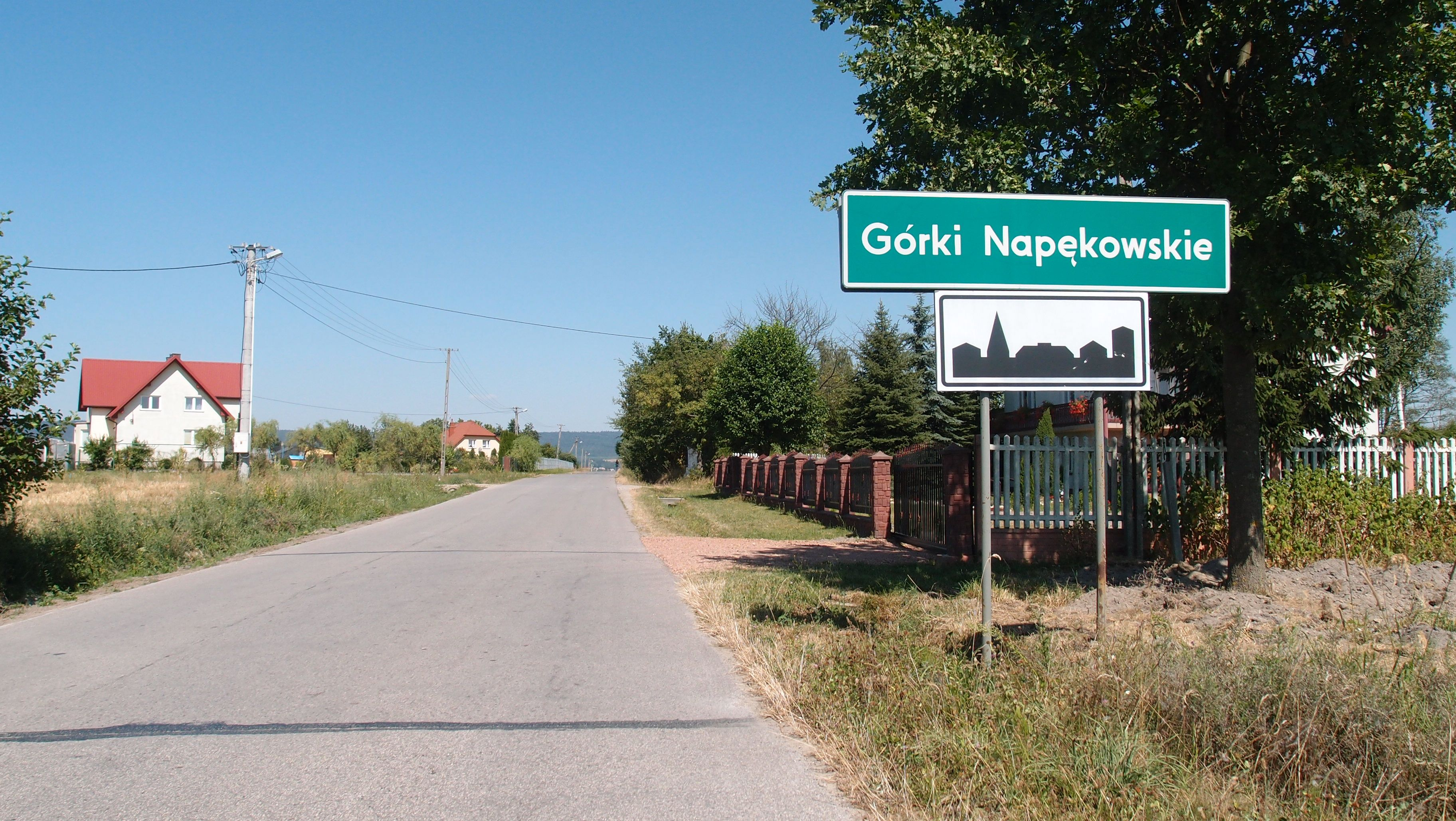

- Location within Poland
- Coordinates: 50°49′57″N 20°55′13″E
- Country: Poland
- Voivodeship: Świętokrzyskie
- County: Kielce
- Gmina: Bieliny

Górki Napękowskie [ˈɡurki napɛnˈkɔfskʲɛ] is a village in the administrative district of Gmina Bieliny, within Kielce County, Świętokrzyskie Voivodeship, in south-central Poland. It lies approximately 3 km (2 mi) south of Bieliny and 23 km (14 mi) east of the regional capital Kielce.
