= Lechów, Świętokrzyskie Voivodeship =

Lechów
- Village
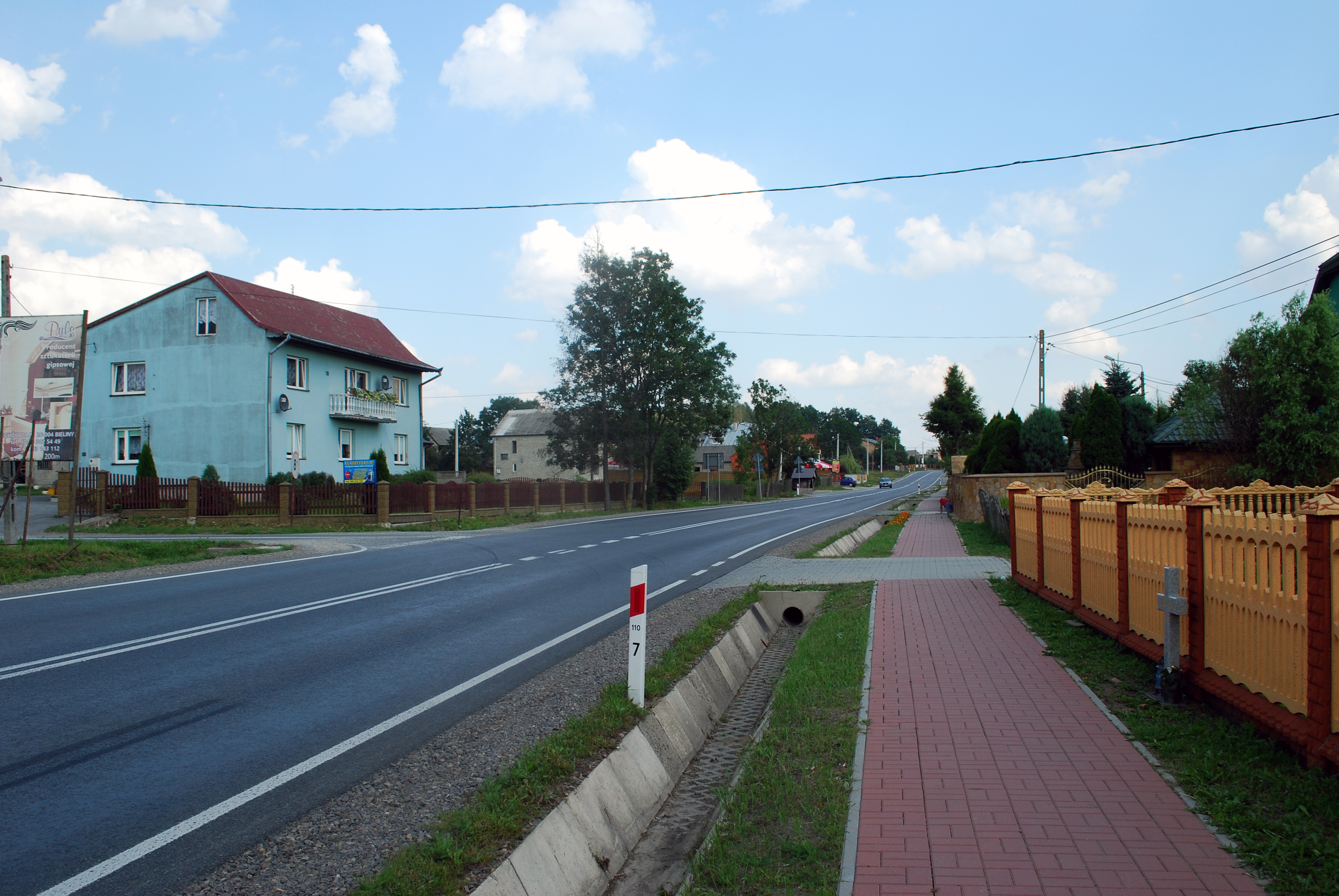

- Location within Poland
- Coordinates: 50°48′20″N 21°0′8″E
- Country: Poland
- Voivodeship: Świętokrzyskie
- County: Kielce
- Gmina: Bieliny
- Population: 1,200

Lechów [ˈlɛxuf] is a village in the administrative district of Gmina Bieliny, within Kielce County, Świętokrzyskie Voivodeship, in south-central Poland. It lies approximately 9 km (6 mi) south-east of Bieliny and 29 km (18 mi) east of the regional capital Kielce.
