= Szklana Huta, Świętokrzyskie Voivodeship =

Szklana Huta
- Village
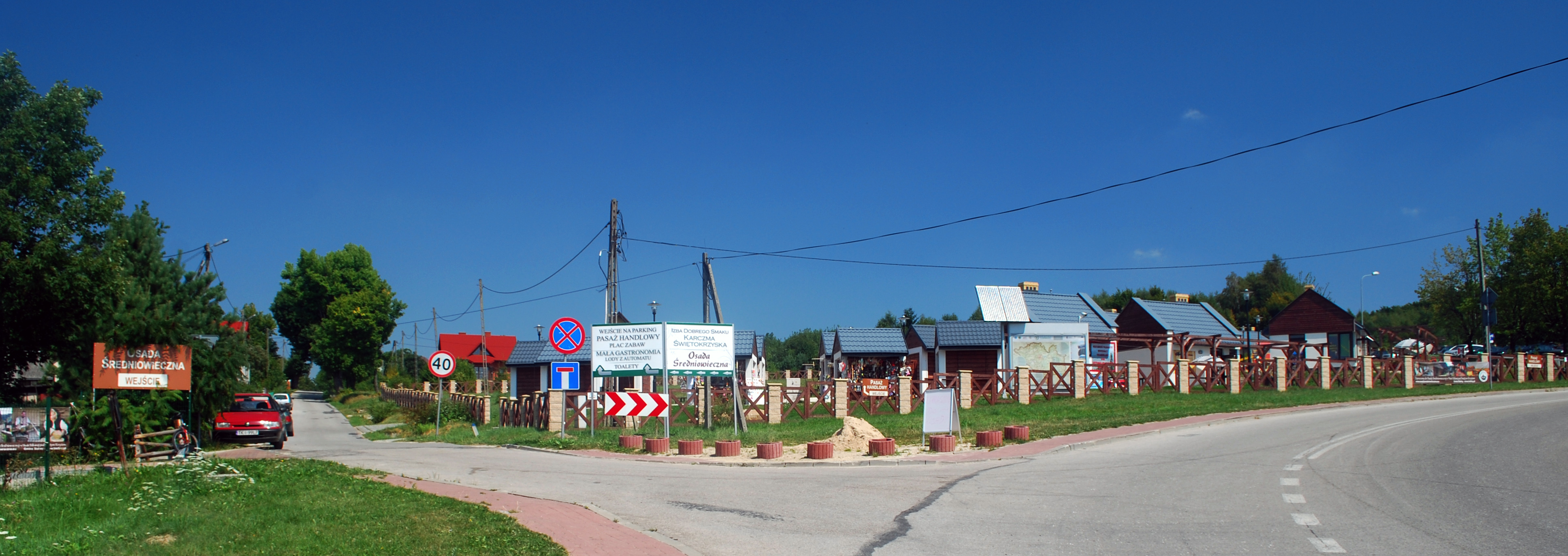

- Location within Poland
- Coordinates: 50°51′30″N 21°1′15″E
- Country: Poland
- Voivodeship: Świętokrzyskie
- County: Kielce
- Gmina: Bieliny
- Population: 200

Szklana Huta [ˈʂklana ˈxuta] is a village in the administrative district of Gmina Bieliny, within Kielce County, Świętokrzyskie Voivodeship, in south-central Poland. It lies approximately 8 km (5 mi) east of Bieliny and 29 km (18 mi) east of the regional capital Kielce.
