= Porąbki =

Porąbki may refer to the following places:

- Porąbki, Opole Voivodeship (south-west Poland)
- Porąbki, Kielce County in Świętokrzyskie Voivodeship (south-central Poland)
- Porąbki, Włoszczowa County in Świętokrzyskie Voivodeship (south-central Poland)
