= Laskowice, Kuyavian-Pomeranian Voivodeship =

Village in Kociewie

Laskowice
- Village
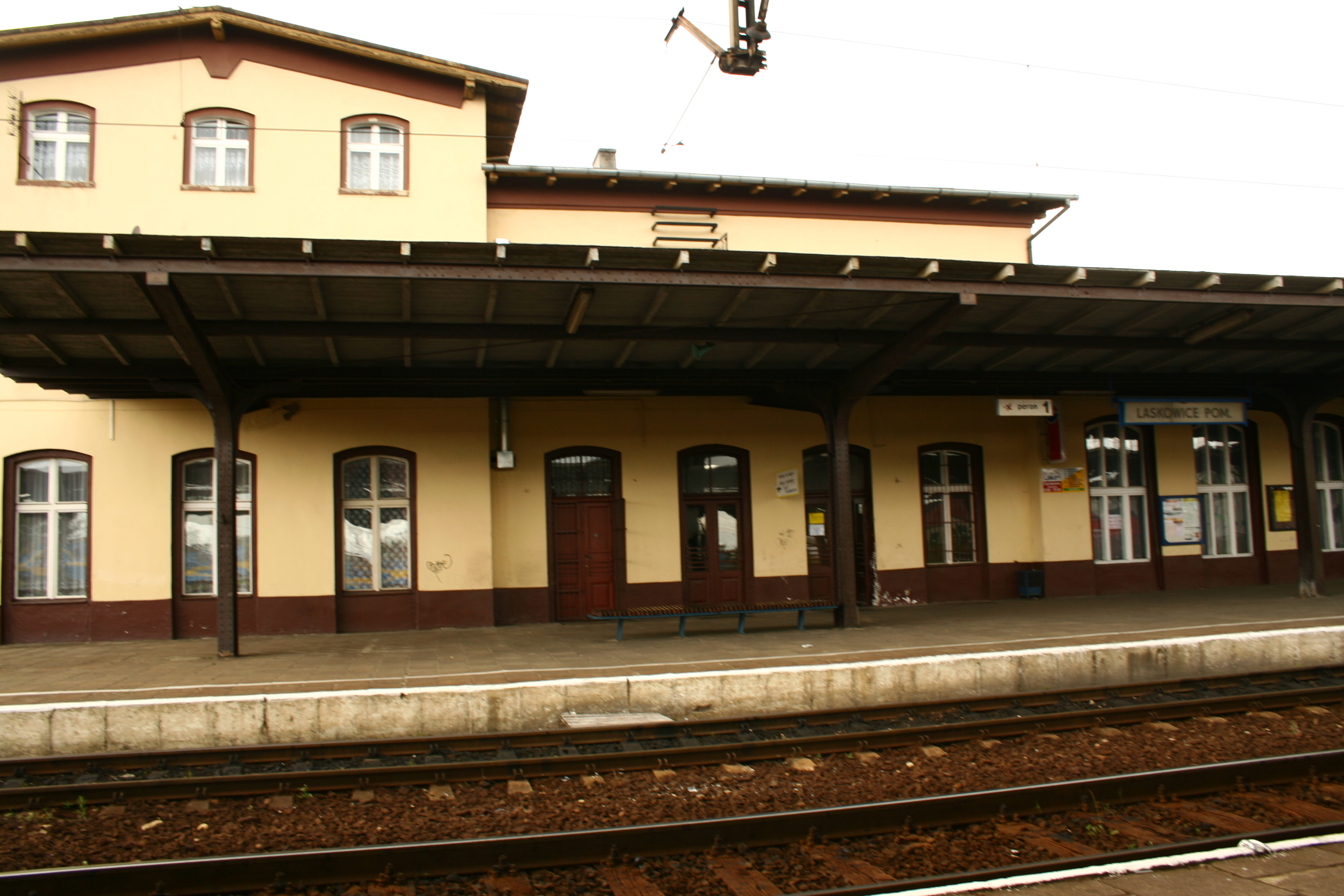
- Railway station in Laskowice

- Location within Poland
- Coordinates: 53°29′9″N 18°26′54″E
- Country: Poland
- Voivodeship: Kuyavian-Pomeranian
- County: Świecie
- Gmina: Jeżewo
- Population: 2,500

Laskowice [laskɔˈvit͡sɛ] (also known as Laskowice Pomorskie) is a village in the administrative district of Gmina Jeżewo, within Świecie County, Kuyavian-Pomeranian Voivodeship, in north-central Poland. It lies approximately 5 kilometres (3 mi) south-west of Jeżewo, 8 km (5 mi) north of Świecie, 51 km (32 mi) north-east of Bydgoszcz, and 52 km (32 mi) north of Toruń.

The village is a major rail junction, where the Bydgoszcz-Gdynia line merges with the connection to Warsaw, via Grudziądz.
