= Białe Błota =

Białe Błota may refer to:

- Białe Błota, Aleksandrów County in Kuyavian-Pomeranian Voivodeship (north-central Poland)
- Białe Błota, Bydgoszcz County in Kuyavian-Pomeranian Voivodeship (north-central Poland)
- Białe Błota, Lipno County in Kuyavian-Pomeranian Voivodeship (north-central Poland)
- Białe Błota, Mogilno County in Kuyavian-Pomeranian Voivodeship (north-central Poland)
- Białe Błota, Świecie County in Kuyavian-Pomeranian Voivodeship (north-central Poland)
- Białe Błota, Pomeranian Voivodeship (north Poland)
