= Napęków =

- Village
- Location within Poland
- Coordinates: 50°49′19″N 20°54′2″E
- Country: Poland
- Voivodeship: Świętokrzyskie
- County: Kielce
- Gmina: Bieliny
- Population: 580

Napęków [naˈpɛŋkuf] is a village in the administrative district of Gmina Bieliny, within Kielce County, Świętokrzyskie Voivodeship, in south-central Poland. It lies approximately 4 km (2 mi) south of Bieliny and 22 km (14 mi) east of the regional capital Kielce.
