= Makoszyn =

- Village
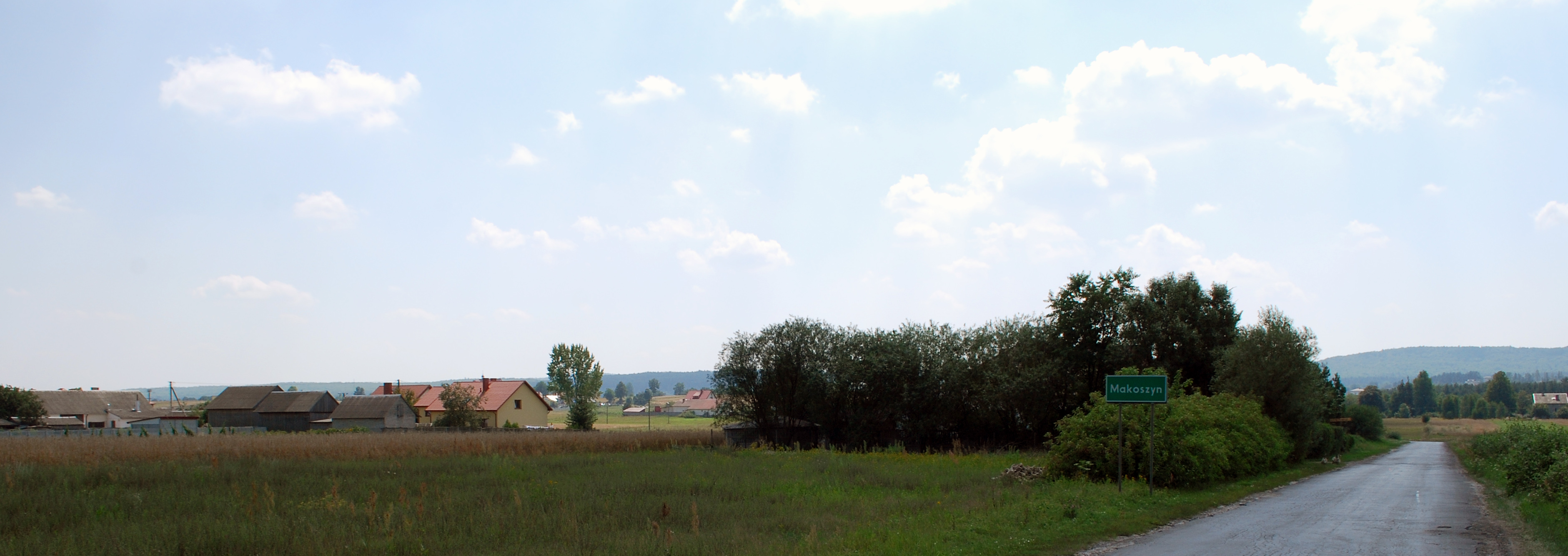

- Location within Poland
- Coordinates: 50°48′25″N 20°58′13″E
- Country: Poland
- Voivodeship: Świętokrzyskie
- County: Kielce
- Gmina: Bieliny
- Population: 750

Makoszyn [maˈkɔʂɨn] is a village in the administrative district of Gmina Bieliny, within Kielce County, Świętokrzyskie Voivodeship, in south-central Poland. It lies approximately 7 km (4 mi) south-east of Bieliny and 27 km (17 mi) east of the regional capital Kielce.
