= Kakonin =

- Village
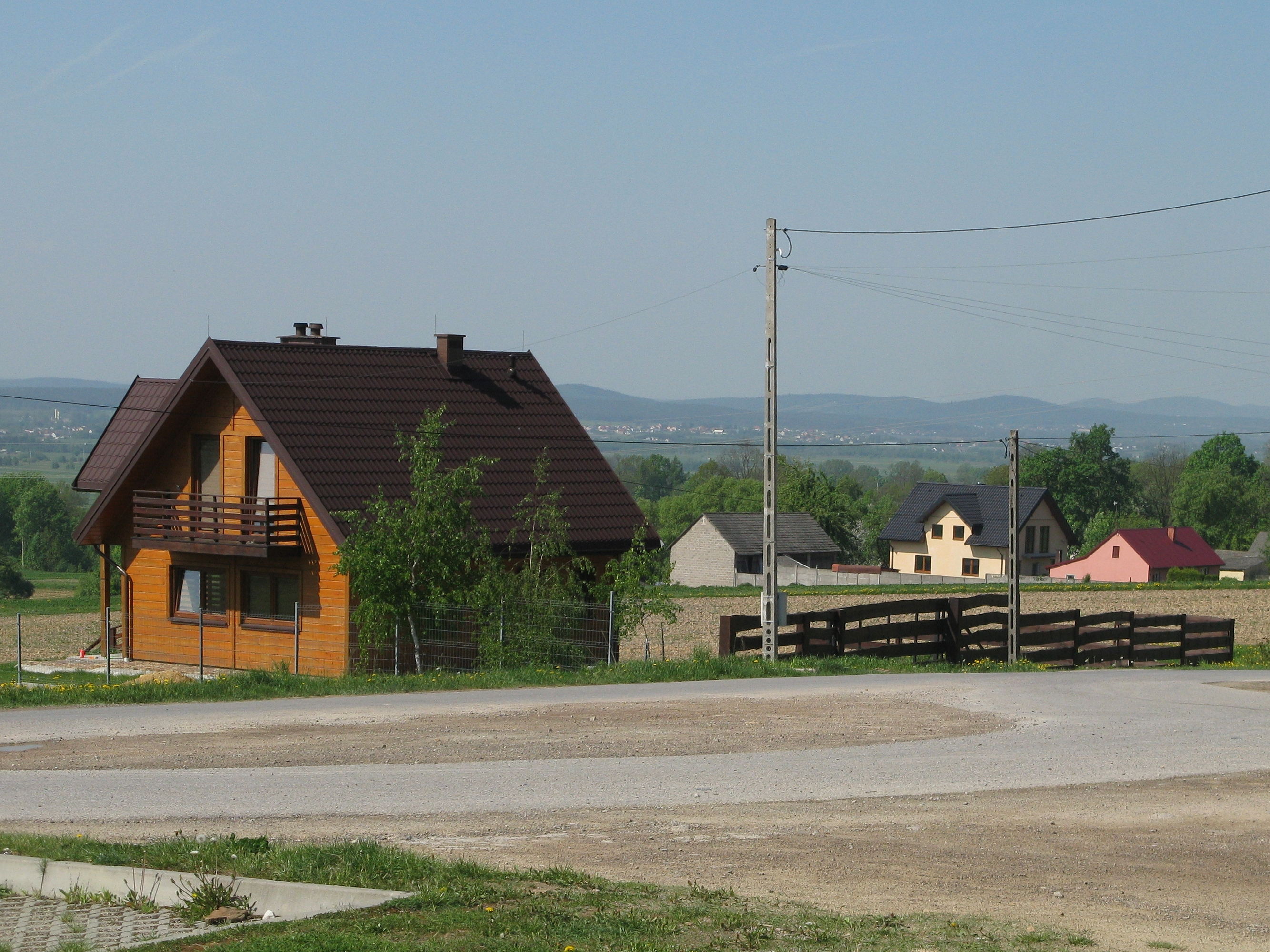
- Houses in Kakonin

- Location within Poland
- Coordinates: 50°52′13″N 20°55′9″E
- Country: Poland
- Voivodeship: Świętokrzyskie
- County: Kielce
- Gmina: Bieliny
- Elevation: 380 m (1,250 ft)
- Population (approx.): 350

Kakonin [kaˈkɔnin] is a village in the administrative district of Gmina Bieliny, within Kielce County, Świętokrzyskie Voivodeship, in south-central Poland. It lies approximately 3 km (2 mi) north of Bieliny and 22 km (14 mi) east of the regional capital Kielce.
