= Białe Jezioro (Bytów County) =

Lake in Poland

- Location within Pomeranian Voivodeship
- Location: Bytów County
- Coordinates: 54°02′31″N 17°13′11″E
- Basin countries: Poland
- Surface area: 9.52 ha (23.5 acres)

Białe Jezioro (Kashubian: Biôłé Jezoro) is a lake in Bytów County, Pomeranian Voivodship, Poland. The area of the lake is 95,200 m^{2}.

The lake is in the source area of the Wieprza river.

== See also ==
- Białe Jezioro (disambiguation)
