= Osłowo, Kuyavian-Pomeranian Voivodeship =

Village in Kociewie

Osłowo
- Village
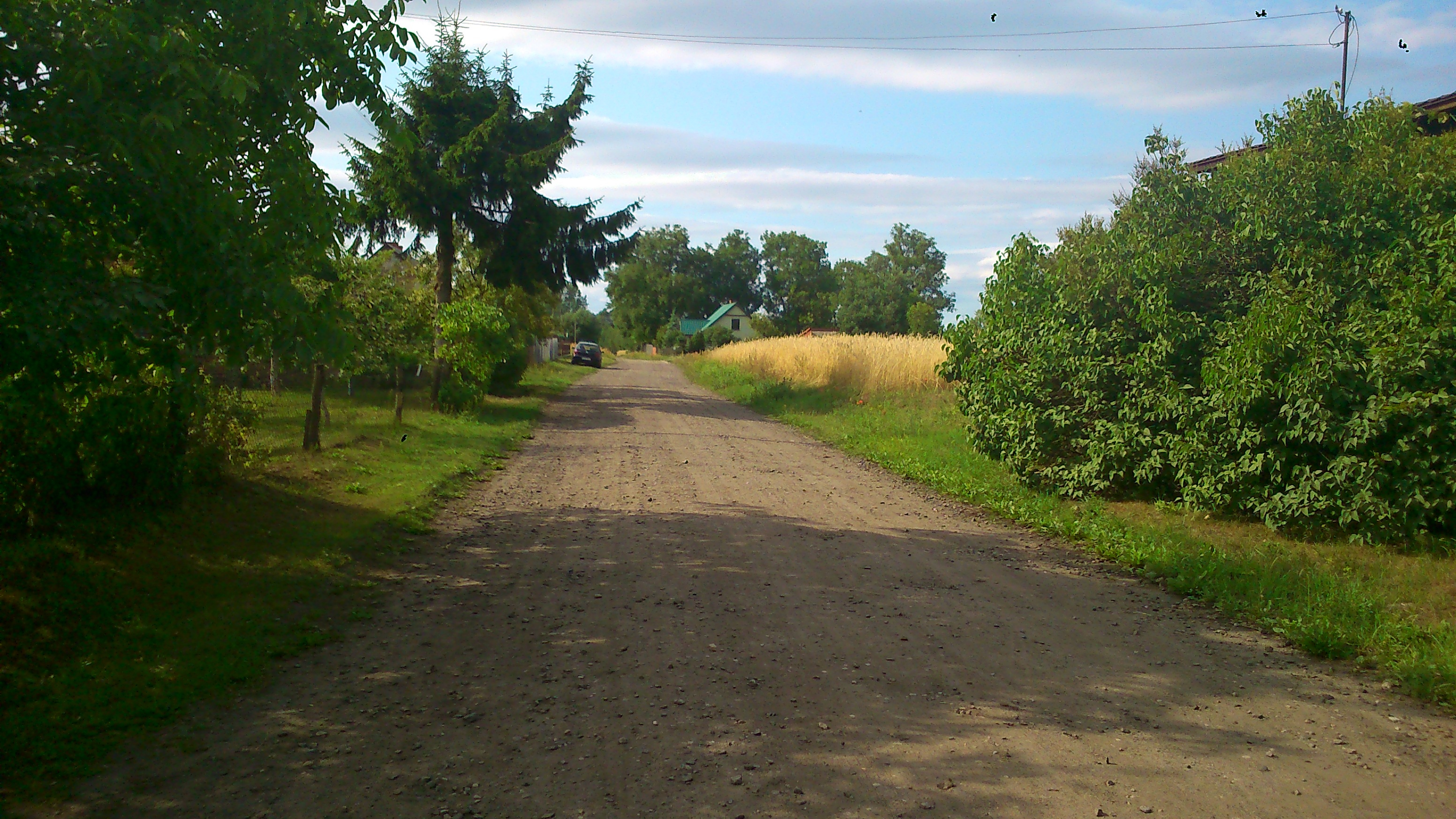

- Location within Poland
- Coordinates: 53°29′N 18°26′E
- Country: Poland
- Voivodeship: Kuyavian-Pomeranian
- County: Świecie
- Gmina: Jeżewo
- Population (2007): 164
- Area code: (+48) 52
- Vehicle registration: CSW

Osłowo [ɔˈswɔvɔ] is a village in the administrative district of Gmina Jeżewo, within Świecie County, Kuyavian-Pomeranian Voivodeship, in north-central Poland.
