= Gmina Jeżewo =

Gmina Jeżewo Jeżewo Commune
- Gmina
- Coat of arms
- Interactive map of Gmina Jeżewo
- Coordinates (Jeżewo): 53°30′34″N 18°29′44″E
- Country: Poland
- Voivodeship: Kuyavian-Pomeranian
- County: Świecie
- Seat: Jeżewo

Area
  - Total: 155.93 km^{2} (60.20 sq mi)

Population (2006)
  - Total: 7,736
  - Density: 49.61/km^{2} (128.5/sq mi)
- Website: http://www.ug-jezewo.lo.pl/

Gmina Jeżewo is a rural gmina (administrative district) in Świecie County, Kuyavian-Pomeranian Voivodeship, in north-central Poland. Its seat is the village of Jeżewo, which lies approximately 12 kilometres (7 mi) north of Świecie, 54 km (34 mi) north of Toruń, and 55 km (34 mi) north-east of Bydgoszcz.

The gmina covers an area of 155.93 square kilometres (60.2 sq mi), and as of 2006 its total population is 7,736.

The gmina contains part of the protected area called Wda Landscape Park.

== Villages ==
Gmina Jeżewo contains the villages and settlements of Belno, Białe, Białe Błota, Buczek, Ciemniki, Czersk Świecki, Dubielno, Jeżewo, Krąplewice, Laskowice, Lipienki, Lipno, Nowe Krąplewice, Osłowo, Pięćmorgi, Piskarki, Skrzynki, Taszewko, Taszewo and Taszewskie Pole.

== Neighbouring gminas ==
Gmina Jeżewo is bordered by the gminas of Dragacz, Drzycim, Osie, Świecie and Warlubie.
