= Czersk Świecki =

Village in Poland

- Village
- Location within Poland
- Coordinates: 53°33′N 18°28′E
- Country: Poland
- Voivodeship: Kuyavian-Pomeranian
- County: Świecie
- Gmina: Jeżewo
- Population: 433

Czersk Świecki (Polish: [t͡ʂɛrsk ˈɕfjɛt͡skʲi]) is a village in the administrative district of Gmina Jeżewo, within Świecie County, Kuyavian-Pomeranian Voivodeship, in north-central Poland. The village is mostly surrounded by farmland.
