= Lipienki =

Village in Kociewie

- Village
- Location within Poland
- Coordinates: 53°30′36″N 18°28′28″E
- Country: Poland
- Voivodeship: Kuyavian-Pomeranian
- County: Świecie
- Gmina: Jeżewo
- Population: 87

Lipienki [liˈpjɛnki] is a village in the administrative district of Gmina Jeżewo, within Świecie County, Kuyavian-Pomeranian Voivodeship, in north-central Poland.
