= Gmina Bieliny =

Gmina Bieliny Bieliny Commune
- Gmina
- Flag Coat of arms
- Interactive map of Gmina Bieliny
- Coordinates (Bieliny): 50°51′0″N 20°54′34″E
- Country: Poland
- Voivodeship: Świętokrzyskie
- County: Kielce County
- Seat: Bieliny

Area
  - Total: 88.09 km^{2} (34.01 sq mi)

Population (2006)
  - Total: 9,832
  - Density: 111.6/km^{2} (289.1/sq mi)
- Website: http://www.bieliny.pl

Gmina Bieliny is a rural gmina (administrative district) in Kielce County, Świętokrzyskie Voivodeship, in south-central Poland. Its seat is the village of Bieliny, which lies approximately 21 kilometres (13 mi) east of the regional capital Kielce.

The gmina covers an area of 88.09 square kilometres (34.0 sq mi), and as of 2006 its total population is 9,832.

The gmina contains part of the protected area called Cisów-Orłowiny Landscape Park.

== Villages ==
Gmina Bieliny contains the villages and settlements of Belno, Bieliny, Bieliny Poduchowne, Czaplów, Górki Napękowskie, Huta Podłysica, Kakonin, Lechów, Makoszyn, Napęków, Nowa Huta, Porąbki, Stara Huta, Stara Huta-Koszary and Szklana Huta.

== Neighbouring gminas ==
Gmina Bieliny is bordered by the gminas of Bodzentyn, Daleszyce, Górno, Łagów and Nowa Słupia.
