= Lipno, Świecie County =

Village in Kociewie

Lipno
- Village
- Location within Poland
- Coordinates: 53°28′44″N 18°27′28″E
- Country: Poland
- Voivodeship: Kuyavian-Pomeranian
- County: Świecie
- Gmina: Jeżewo
- Population: 89

Lipno (Polish pronunciation: [ˈlipnɔ]) is a village in the administrative district of Gmina Jeżewo, within Świecie County, Kuyavian-Pomeranian Voivodeship, in north-central Poland.
