= David Biale =

American historian (1949–2024)

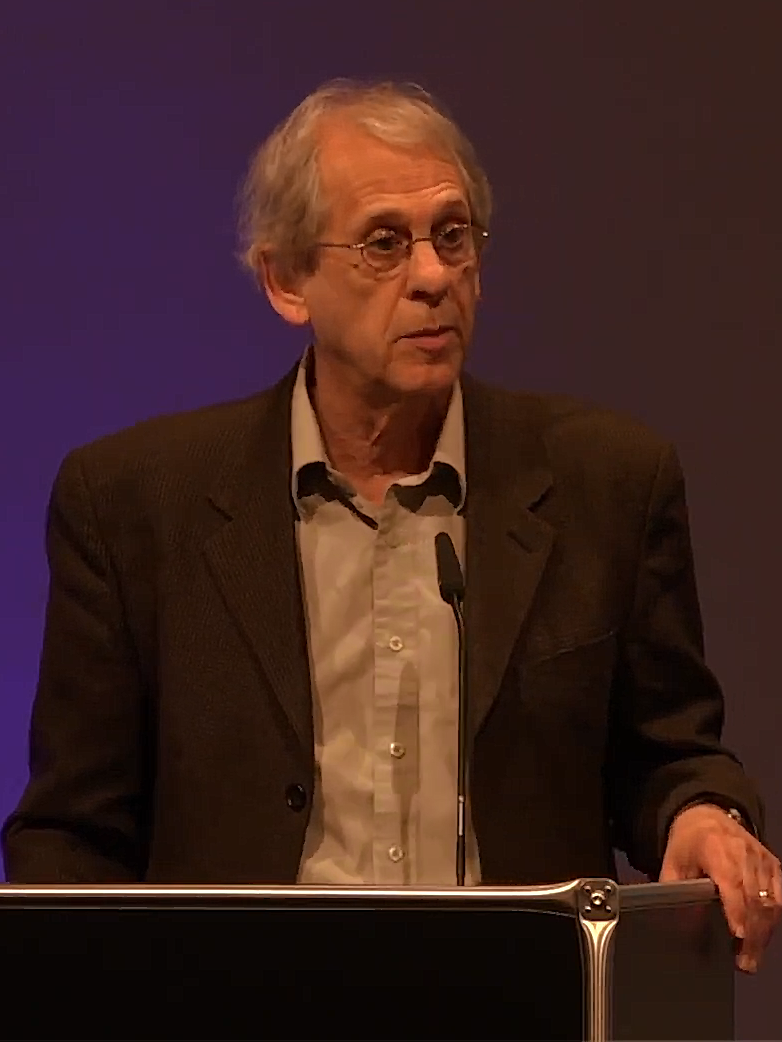
- Biale giving a lecture at Jewish Museum Berlin in 2017
- Born: July 25, 1949
- Died: July 28, 2024 (aged 75)
- Occupation: Scholar of Judaism

David Biale (July 25, 1949 – July 28, 2024) was an American historian specializing in Jewish history.

== Early life and education ==
Biale was born in Los Angeles, California. His father, Jacob Biale, an immigrant from Poland, was a professor of biology at the University of California, Los Angeles, and his mother, Evelyn, was a teacher who held a master's degree in mathematics. Biale attended Harvard University for one year and then earned bachelor's (1971) and master's (1972, Modern European History) degrees at the University of California, Berkeley. After a year as a visiting graduate student at the Hebrew University, he earned his PhD in Jewish history at UCLA in 1977, with Amos Funkenstein.

== Career ==
Biale was the Emanuel Ringelblum Distinguished Professor of Jewish History at the University of California, Davis. He was founding director of the campus's program in Jewish studies and led the program for many years. He also directed its Humanities Institute for three years, and chaired the Department of History for four years. Earlier in his career, Biale was on the history faculty at SUNY Binghamton (1977 to 1986) and led its Judaic studies program. He left Binghamton for the Graduate Theological Union (GTU) in Berkeley, California and was named Koret Professor of Jewish History and director of GTU's (now Richard S. Dinner) Center for Jewish Studies]. He was the author or editor of thirteen books on Jewish intellectual, religious, and cultural history.

Biale's first book, which grew out of his dissertation, was a study of the philosophy of history of Gershom Scholem (Gershom Scholem: Kabbalah and Counter-History, published in 1979 by Harvard University Press). The book received the 1981 Gustave O. Arlt Award in the Humanities. His next published work was a book-length essay on Jewish political history, Power and Powerlessness in Jewish History (1986, Schocken Books). A third monograph, Eros and the Jews (1997, University of California Press), examined issues of sexuality, gender and marriage from the Bible through the Talmud, the Middle Ages and modern Jewish history. The latter two books were based on a genealogical approach to Jewish history in which Biale traced the career of a concept over a three-thousand-year course.

In 2002, Biale published an edited volume, Cultures of the Jews: Mediterranean Origins, Vol. 1 (2002, Schocken Books), which marked an innovative turn in the field of Jewish studies.

In Blood and Belief: The Circulation of a Symbol Between Jews and Christians (2007, University of California Press), Biale traced the genealogy of blood in Jewish history. In 2010, he turned his attention to the place of secularism in Jewish thought, arguing in Not in the Heavens: The Tradition of Jewish Secular Thought that the "secular always exists in dialectical relationship to the Jewish religious tradition."

Biale was also selected to edit with general editor Jack Miles (University of California, Irvine) the Judaism volume of the Norton Anthology of World Religions (2015, W.W. Norton).

He served as project director and lead author for a collaborative history of Hasidism, Hasidism: A New History (2018, Princeton University Press), with David Assaf, Benjamin Brown, Uriel Gellman, Samuel Heilman, Moshe Rosman, Gadi Sagiv, and Marcin Wodziński. He was co-editor (with M. Galchinsky and S. Heschel) of Insider/Outsider: American Jews and Multiculturalism.

== Awards and honors ==
Biale was awarded fellowships from the John Simon Guggenheim Memorial Foundation, the National Endowment for the Humanities, the Lady Davis Foundation, and an early career fellowship from the American Council of Learned Societies. He was awarded UC Davis’ highest professional honor, the Prize for Undergraduate Teaching and Scholarly Achievement. He was a three-time recipient of the National Jewish Book Award, and a Fellow of the American Academy of Jewish Research.

== Personal life and death ==
David Biale was married for 51 years to Rachel Biale, a writer and social worker. They had two children, Noam and Tali, and several grandchildren. The family returned to Berkeley in 1986. In addition to his academic work, Biale was a bread baker, avid cyclist, and amateur student of piano. He delivered his final lecture and retired from the faculty of UC Davis after 23 years in June 2022.

Biale died from prostate cancer at his home in Berkeley on July 28, 2024. He was 75.
