= Krąplewice =

Village in Kociewie

- Village
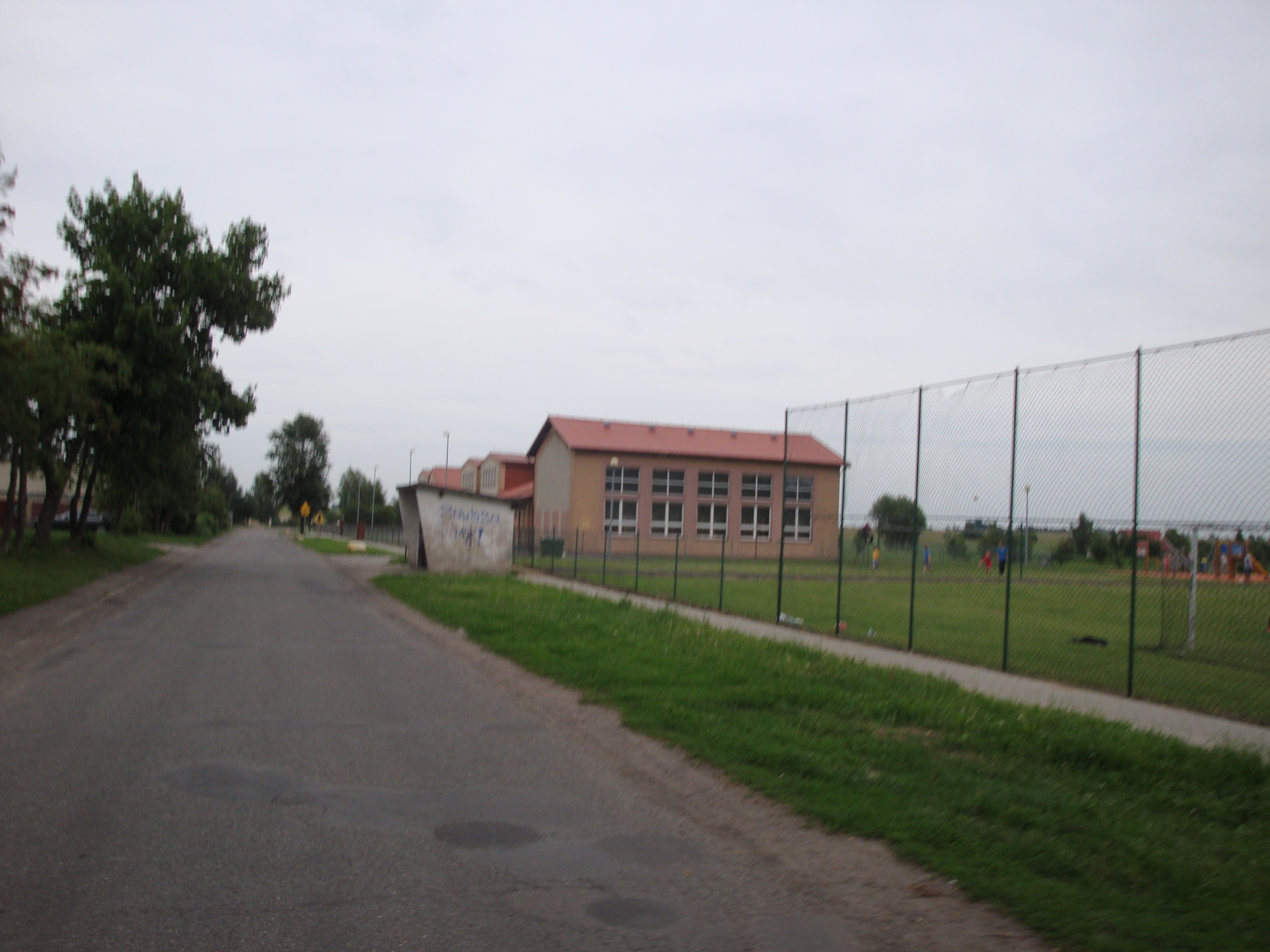
- School and playground in Krąplewice

- Location within Poland
- Coordinates: 53°30′N 18°25′E
- Country: Poland
- Voivodeship: Kuyavian-Pomeranian
- County: Świecie
- Gmina: Jeżewo
- Population: 677

Krąplewice [krɔmplɛˈvit͡sɛ] is a village in the administrative district of Gmina Jeżewo, within Świecie County, Kuyavian-Pomeranian Voivodeship, in north-central Poland.
