= Jezioro Białe (Gostynin County) =

Lake in Poland

- Location within Masovian Voivodeship
- Location: Gostynin County
- Coordinates: 52°29′32″N 19°30′49″E
- Basin countries: Poland
- Surface area: 142.5 ha (352 acres)
- Surface elevation: 72.4 m (238 ft)

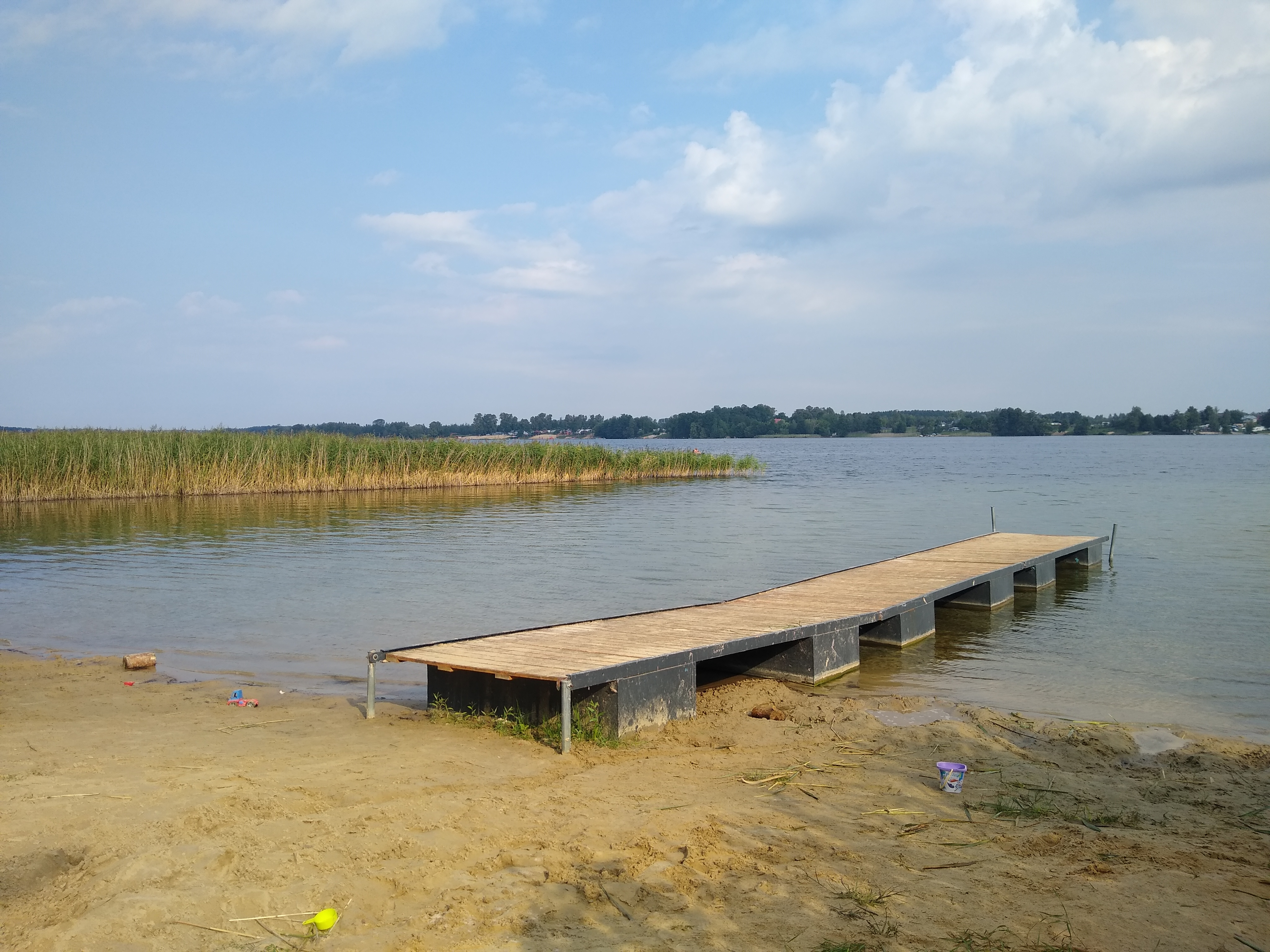
Lake Białe - beach

Jezioro Białe is a lake in Poland, Masovian Voivodship, in Gostynin County, with an area of the lake 1.425 km².

== See also ==
- Jezioro Białe (disambiguation)
