= Belno, Gmina Bieliny =

Belno
- Village
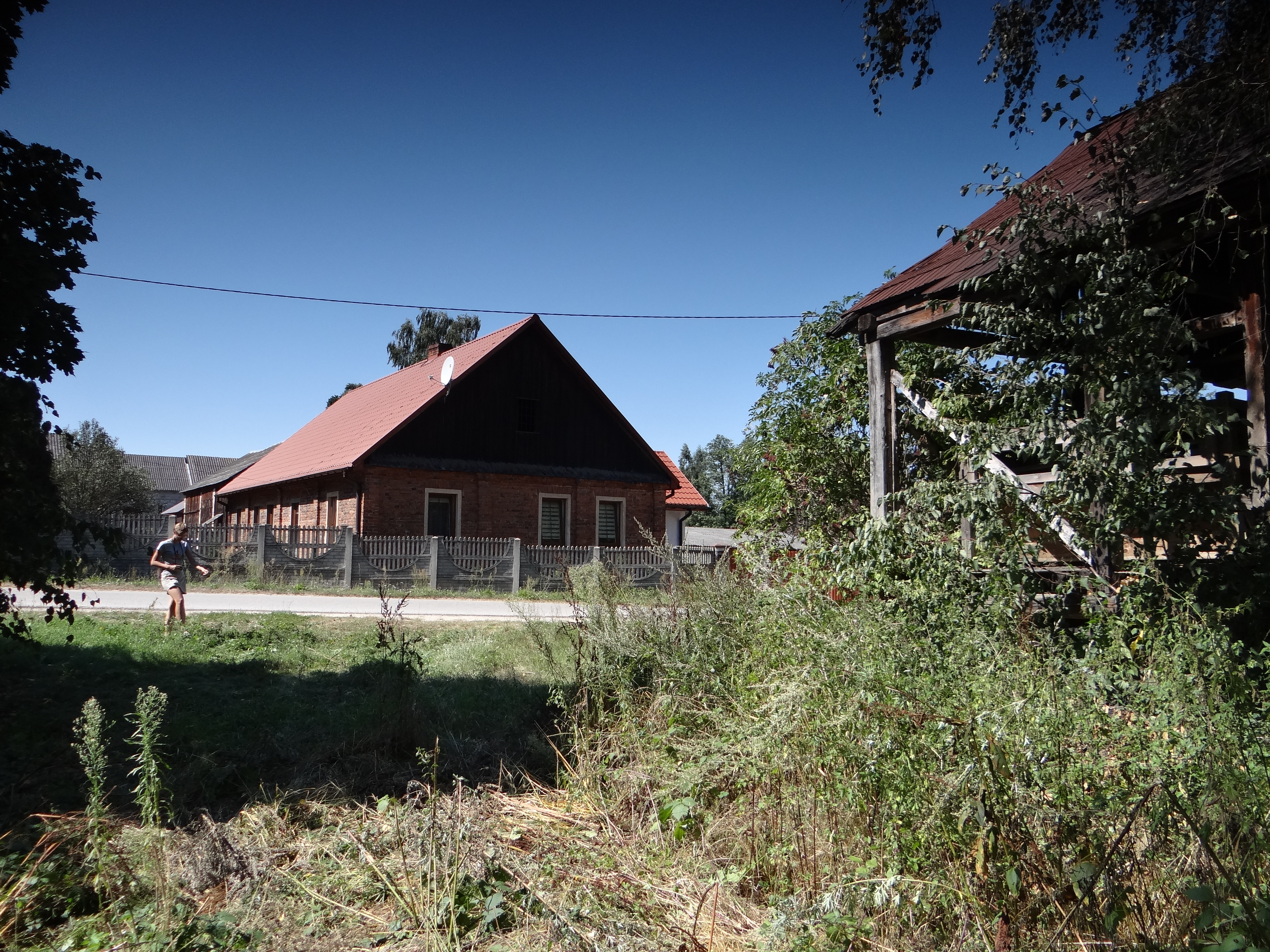

- Location within Poland
- Coordinates: 50°48′53″N 20°56′39″E
- Country: Poland
- Voivodeship: Świętokrzyskie
- County: Kielce
- Gmina: Bieliny
- Population: 440

Belno [ˈbɛlnɔ] is a village in the administrative district of Gmina Bieliny, within Kielce County, Świętokrzyskie Voivodeship, in south-central Poland. It lies approximately 5 km (3 mi) south-east of Bieliny and 25 km (16 mi) east of the regional capital Kielce.
