= Taszewo =

Village in Kociewie

- Village
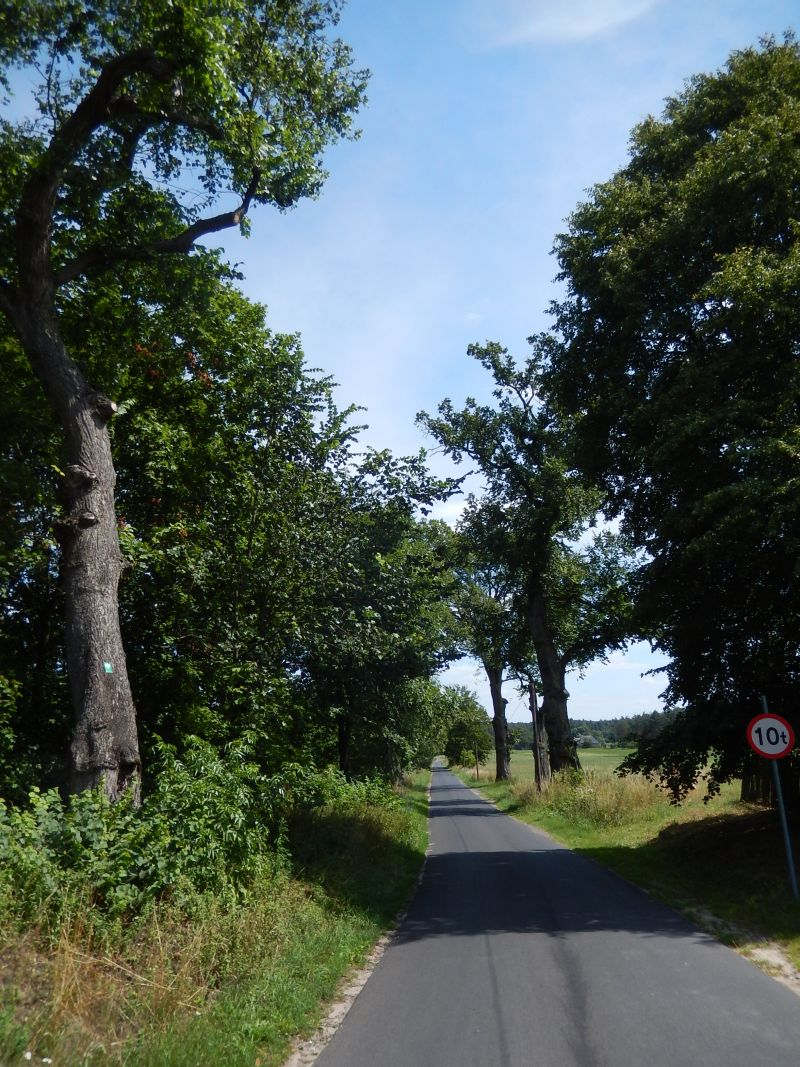

- Location within Poland
- Coordinates: 53°29′N 18°31′E
- Country: Poland
- Voivodeship: Kuyavian-Pomeranian
- County: Świecie
- Gmina: Jeżewo
- Population: 144

Taszewo [taˈʂɛvɔ] is a village in the administrative district of Gmina Jeżewo, within Świecie County, Kuyavian-Pomeranian Voivodeship, in north-central Poland.
