= Dubielno, Świecie County =

Village in Kociewie

Dubielno
- Village
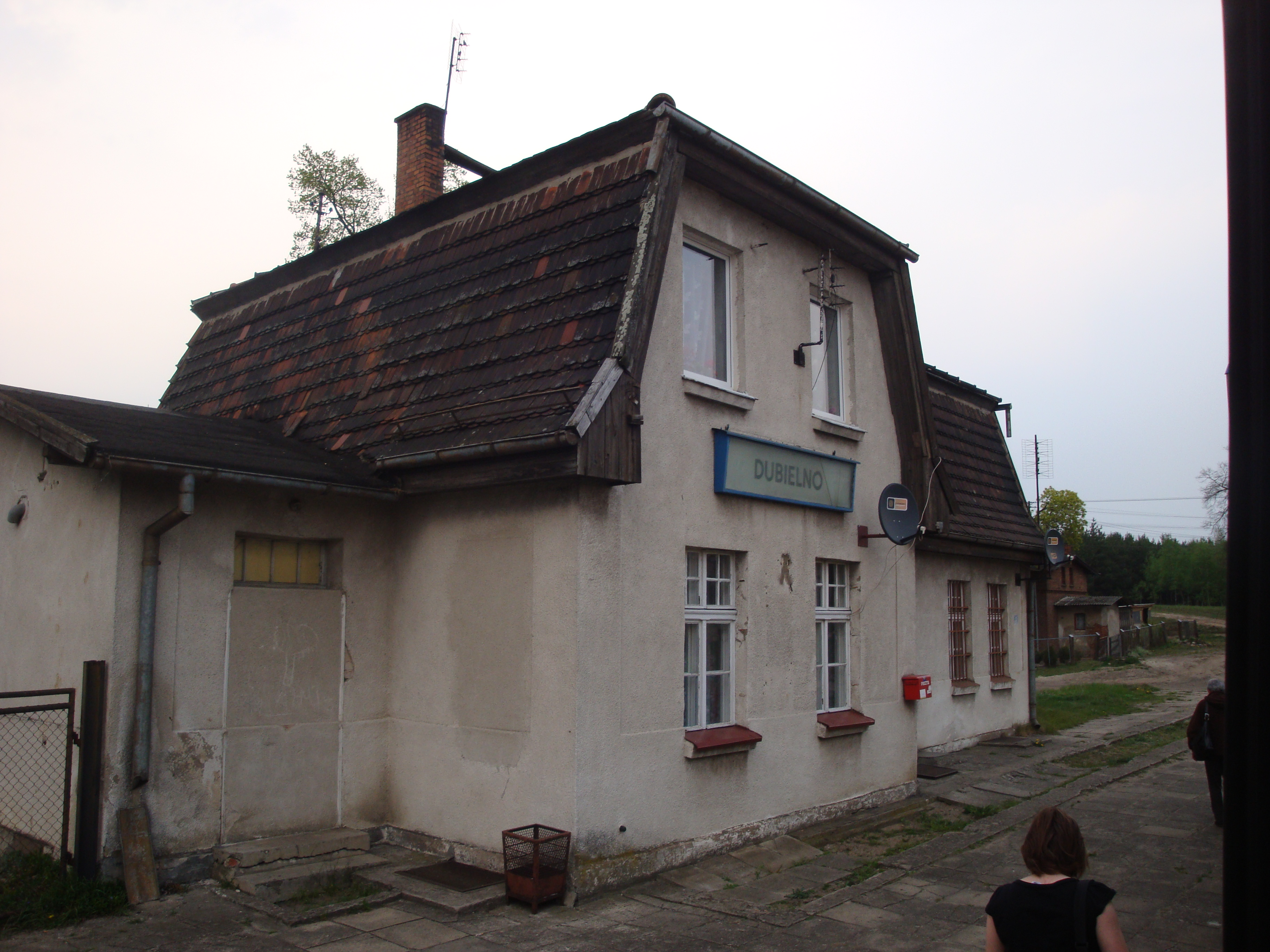
- Railway station in Dubielno

- Location within Poland
- Coordinates: 53°29′N 18°34′E
- Country: Poland
- Voivodeship: Kuyavian-Pomeranian
- County: Świecie
- Gmina: Jeżewo
- Population: 183

Dubielno [duˈbjɛlnɔ] is a village in the administrative district of Gmina Jeżewo, within Świecie County, Kuyavian-Pomeranian Voivodeship, in north-central Poland. The village has a population of 167 people, with a population density of 27.97/km² in 2021.
