= Porąbki, Kielce County =

Porąbki
- Village
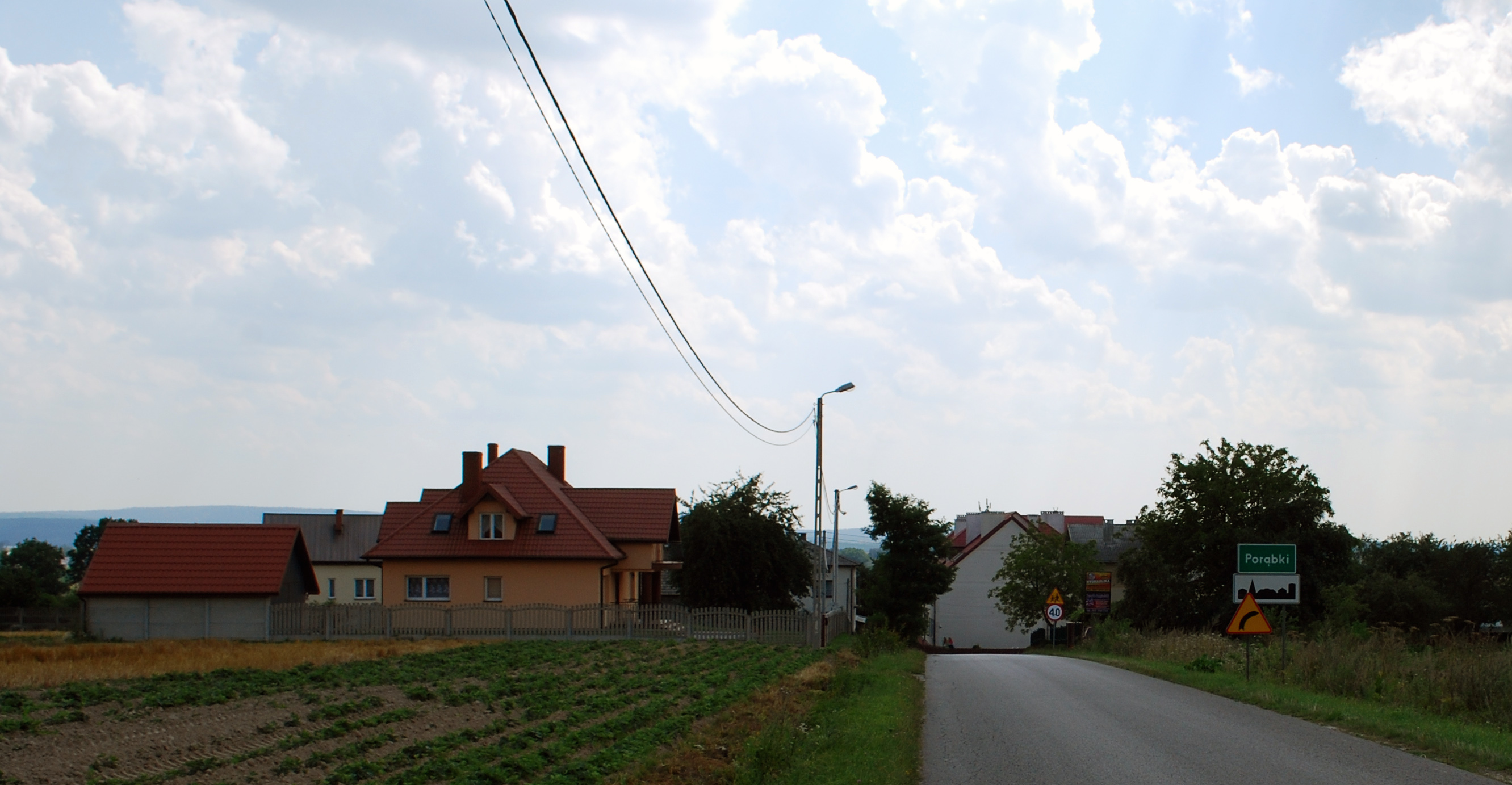

- Location within Poland
- Coordinates: 50°52′1″N 20°53′17″E
- Country: Poland
- Voivodeship: Świętokrzyskie
- County: Kielce
- Gmina: Bieliny
- Population: 690

Porąbki [pɔˈrɔmpki] is a village in the administrative district of Gmina Bieliny, within Kielce County, Świętokrzyskie Voivodeship, in south-central Poland. It lies approximately 3 km (2 mi) north-west of Bieliny and 20 km (12 mi) east of the regional capital Kielce.
