= Rachel Biale =

Israeli-American author

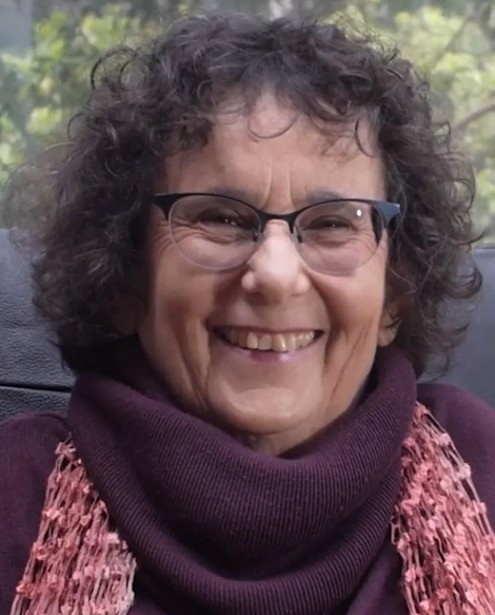
- Biale in 2024
- Born: Rachel Korati; 1952 (age 73–74); Kibbutz Kfar Ruppin, Israel
- Education: University of California, Los Angeles (BA, MA); Yeshiva University (MSW)
- Occupation: Author
- Spouse: David Biale
- Writing career
- Language: English, Hebrew
- Period: 1975–present
- Genres: Memoir, historical fiction, Jewish studies, parenting
- Subjects: Kibbutz life, women in Judaism, Jewish law, parenting
- Notable works: Women and Jewish Law (1984); Growing Up Below Sea Level (2020)
- Website: rachelbiale.com

Rachel Biale (born 1952) is an Israeli-American author based in Berkeley, California. She is best known for Women and Jewish Law (1984), a study of women's issues in halakhic sources, and for her memoir Growing Up Below Sea Level: A Kibbutz Childhood (2020).

For three years, Biale wrote a parenting advice column titled "Parenting for the Perplexed" for J. The Jewish News of Northern California.

== Early life and education ==
Biale was born in 1952 and raised on Kibbutz Kfar Ruppin, in the Beit She'an Valley of northern Israel, near the Jordan River. The kibbutz had been founded in 1938 by Jewish immigrants from Germany and later Czechoslovakia, including Biale's parents, Anina Vohryzek and Kurt Tramer, who had fled Prague in 1939. Her parents' route to Palestine included a voyage on the refugee boat Atlantic, capture by British forces, and years of detention on the island of Mauritius before her father volunteered for the British Army and her mother eventually reached Palestine in 1945.

Biale spent an academic year at Newton High School in a Boston suburb. After returning to Israel, she transferred to the Jordan Valley Regional High School, where she studied Jewish thought under Ehud Luz, later a professor at Haifa University. She subsequently served in the Israel Defense Forces, commanding a unit of female soldiers.

Biale moved to the United States in 1973 and earned a Bachelor of Arts and Master of Arts in Jewish history from the University of California, Los Angeles, followed by a Master of Social Work from the Wurzweiler School of Social Work at Yeshiva University.

== Works ==
=== Women and Jewish Law (1984) ===
Biale's first book, Women and Jewish Law, was published by Schocken Books in 1984 and drew on her graduate studies at UCLA. It examined halakhic sources on marriage, divorce, the agunah, sexuality, niddah, contraception, abortion, and rape. Reviewing the book in Lilith Magazine, Beverly Gribetz described it as a lucid and dispassionate account of some of the major issues as they are represented in halacha, praising the author's ability to make the material accessible to non-specialists. The book received the Kenneth Smilen Award in Jewish Thought of the National Jewish Book Council in 1984.

=== Children's books and parenting writing ===
Biale wrote and illustrated the Hebrew children's book The Old Clock (1975) and later wrote and illustrated two English titles in the "Let's Make a Book about It" series, We Are Moving (1996) and My Pet Died (2004), designed to help parents address childhood transitions and loss. In 2020, Koehler Books published her advice manual What Now? 2-Minute Tips for Solving Common Parenting Challenges.

=== Growing Up Below Sea Level (2020) ===
Growing Up Below Sea Level: A Kibbutz Childhood, published by Mandel Vilar Press in 2020, is a memoir told through linked short stories about Biale's childhood on Kfar Ruppin during the 1950s and 1960s. Writing in the Los Angeles Review of Books, Charles Dunst called the book a welcoming time capsule and observed that it reminded readers of Israel's earlier socialist period, though he faulted it for insufficient engagement with the situation of Palestinians. Jonathan Kirsch, book editor of the Jewish Journal, described the memoir as enchanting and compelling and noted its value as a lens on how much Israel had changed since Biale's youth. Washington Jewish Week called it a delightful work that painted illuminating portraits of the kibbutzim in the twentieth century. The book was selected for the Sandra Seltzer Silberman Conversations Series at Brandeis University's Hadassah-Brandeis Institute.

=== Aerograms Across the Ocean (2021) ===
In 2021, Biale co-authored Aerograms Across the Ocean: A Love Story in Letters, 1970–1972 with her husband, historian David Biale, published by Wildcat Books. The joint memoir is built around 258 letters the couple exchanged while she was in Israel and he was studying at Berkeley, and traces the development of their intellectual and personal relationship in the years after the Six-Day War and during the Vietnam War. Reviewing the book in the Jewish Review of Books, Allan Arkush wrote that it throws a revealing light both on the public life of the period and on the intellectual starting points of the two Biales and suggested that it could be read as a kind of counter-history to Gershom Scholem's From Berlin to Jerusalem.

=== Lost and Found (2022) and And Now Love Can Begin (2025) ===
Biale's historical novel Lost and Found was published by Wildcat Books in 2022. Set in Europe and British Mandate Palestine between 1940 and 1944, the novel is based on the true story of a Viennese Jewish family who traveled on the Atlantic, the same refugee ship as Biale's parents, and centers on the disappearance of a four-year-old boy in the explosion that sank the Patria in Haifa harbor.

In 2025, she published And Now Love Can Begin, an imagined memoir of her parents based on 100 letters they exchanged in Palestine between September 1945 and July 1946, while her mother worked as a nurse in Afula and her father served in the British Army in Palestine and Alexandria, Egypt.

=== Artwork ===
Alongside her writing, Biale is a calligrapher and illuminator of ketubot, or Jewish marriage contracts, and has illustrated her own children's books and her parenting advice book.

== Personal life ==
Biale met her future husband, historian David Biale, in the summer of 1970, when he arrived at Kfar Ruppin as an American student volunteer. The two married in 1973 and after completing graduate school at UCLA and David's position in SUNY Binghamton, they settled in Berkeley, California. in 1986. David Biale, who held the Emanuel Ringelblum Distinguished Professorship in Jewish history at the University of California, Davis, died in 2024, before the publication of Rachel's 2025 memoir of her parents.

== Books ==
- Women and Jewish Law (Schocken Books, 1984)
- We Are Moving: A Let's Make a Book about It Book (1996)
- My Pet Died: A Let's Make a Book about It Book (2004)
- Growing Up Below Sea Level: A Kibbutz Childhood (Mandel Vilar Press, 2020)
- What Now? 2-Minute Tips for Solving Common Parenting Challenges (Koehler Books, 2020)
- Aerograms Across the Ocean: A Love Story in Letters, 1970–1972 (with David Biale; Wildcat Books, 2021)
- Lost and Found (Wildcat Books, 2022)
- And Now Love Can Begin: My Parents' Imagined Memoir (Wildcat Books, 2025)
