= Jewish studies in Poland =

The Jewish studies in Poland before World War II were carried out almost exclusively by Jewish scholars. The Holocaust drastically interrupted this. In an immediate postwar period there were attempts to reestablish the research, however Jewish topics were suppressed in the antisemitic Communist Poland. The revitalization happened in late 1980s after the Communist regime started to crumble.

== Organizations and institutions ==
- Centralna Żydowska Komisja Historyczna
- Jewish Historical Institute
- Polish Association for Jewish Studies
- Polish Association for Judaistic Studies
- Polish Center for Holocaust Research
- Stowarzyszenie Żydowski Instytut Historyczny w Polsce

== Publications ==
- Jewish History Quarterly
- Polish-Jewish Studies
- Scripta Judaica Cracoviensia (pl:Scripta Judaica Cracoviensia)
- Studia Judaica (pl:Studia Judaica)
