= Jeżewo, Świecie County =

Village in Kociewie

Jeżewo
- Village
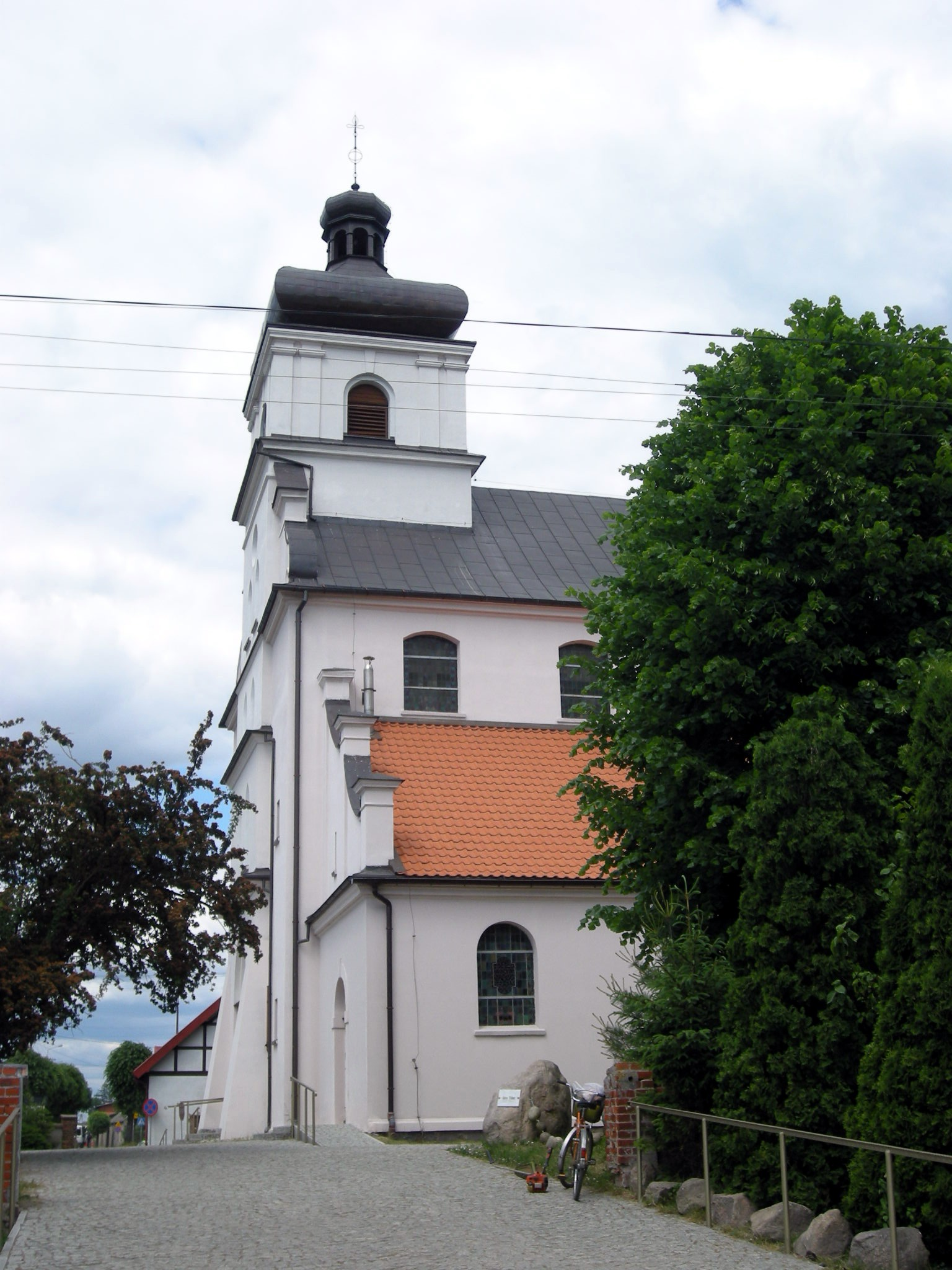

- Location within Poland
- Coordinates: 53°30′34″N 18°29′44″E
- Country: Poland
- Voivodeship: Kuyavian-Pomeranian
- County: Świecie
- Gmina: Jeżewo
- Population: 1,753

Jeżewo (Polish pronunciation: [jɛˈʐɛvɔ]) is a village in Świecie County, Kuyavian-Pomeranian Voivodeship, in north-central Poland. It is the seat of the gmina (administrative district) called Gmina Jeżewo.
