= Jezioro Białe =

Jezioro Białe [jɛˈʑɔrɔ ˈbjawɛ] means 'white lake' in Polish.

Jezioro Białe may refer to:

- Jezioro Białe, Lublin Voivodeship, a lake in Lublin Voivodeship
- Jezioro Białe, Lubusz Voivodship, a lake in Lubusz Voivodship, Międzyrzecz County
- Jezioro Białe, Gostynin County, a lake in Masovian Voivodeship, in Gostynin County
- Jezioro Białe, Sokołów County, a lake in Masovian Voivodeship, Sokołów County
- Jezioro Białe, Gmina Rutka-Tartak, a lake in Podlaskie Voivodeship, Suwałki County
- Jezioro Białe, Gmina Suwałki, a lake in Podlaskie Voivodeship, in Suwałki County
- Jezioro Białe, Gmina Wiżajny, a lake in Podlaskie Voivodeship, in Suwałki County
- Jezioro Białe, Ełk County, a lake in Warmian-Masurian Voivodeship, in Ełk County
- Jezioro Białe, Biała Giżycka, a lake in Warmian-Masurian Voivodeship, in Giżycko County
- Jezioro Białe, Wydmin, a lake in Warmian-Masurian Voivodeship, in Giżycko County
- Jezioro Białe, Mrągowo County, a lake in Warmian-Masurian Voivodeship, in Mrągowo County
- Jezioro Białe, Szczytno County, a lake in Warmian-Masurian Voivodeship, in Szczytno County
- Jezioro Białe, West Pomeranian Voivodship, a lake in West Pomeranian Voivodship, in Myślibórz County
- Jezioro Białe Augustowskie in Augustów
- Jezioro Białe Filipowskie
- Jezioro Białe Miałkie
- Jezioro Białe Sejneńskie
- Jezioro Białe Sosnowickie
- Jezioro Białe Wigierskie

== See also ==
- Białe Jezioro (disambiguation)
