= Białe Jezioro =

Białe Jezioro [ˈbjawɛ jɛˈʑɔrɔ] literally means "White Lake" in Polish.

Białe Jezioro may refer to:

- Białe Jezioro, Bydgoszcz County, a lake in Kuyavian-Pomeranian Voivodeship, Bydgoszcz County
- Białe Jezioro, Tuchola County, a lake in Kuyavian-Pomeranian Voivodeship, Tuchola County
- Białe Jezioro, Bytów County, a lake in Pomeranian Voivodship, Bytów County
- Białe Jezioro, Gmina Przechlewo, a lake in Pomeranian Voivodeship, Człuchów County
- Białe Jezioro, Gmina Chmielno, a lake in Pomeranian Voivodeship, Kartuzy County
- Białe Jezioro, Gmina Kartuzy, a lake in Pomeranian Voivodeship, Kartuzy County
- Białe Jezioro, Gmina Sierakowice, a lake in Pomeranian Voivodeship, Kartuzy County
- Białe Jezioro, Kościerzyna County, a lake in Pomeranian Voivodeship, Kościerzyna County
- Białe Jezioro, Kwidzyn County, a lake in Pomeranian Voivodeship, Kwidzyn County
- Białe Jezioro, Sztum County, a lake in Pomeranian Voivodeship, Sztum County
- Białe Jezioro, Wejherowo County, a lake in Pomeranian Voivodeship, Wejherowo County
- Białe Jezioro, Olsztyn County, a lake in Warmian-Masurian Voivodeship, Olsztyn County
- Białe Jezioro, Węgorzewo County, a lake in Warmian-Masurian Voivodeship, Węgorzewo County
- Białe Jezioro, Chodzież County, a lake in Great Poland Voivodship, Chodzież County
- Białe Jezioro, Czarnków-Trzcianka County, a reservoir in Great Poland Voivodship, Czarnków-Trzcianka County
- Białe Jezioro, Gniezno County, a lake in Great Poland Voivodship, Gniezno County
- Białe Jezioro, West Pomeranian Voivodship, a lake in West Pomeranian Voivodeship, in Szczecinek County

== See also ==
- Jezioro Białe (disambiguation)
