= Moshe Rosman =

Israeli historian

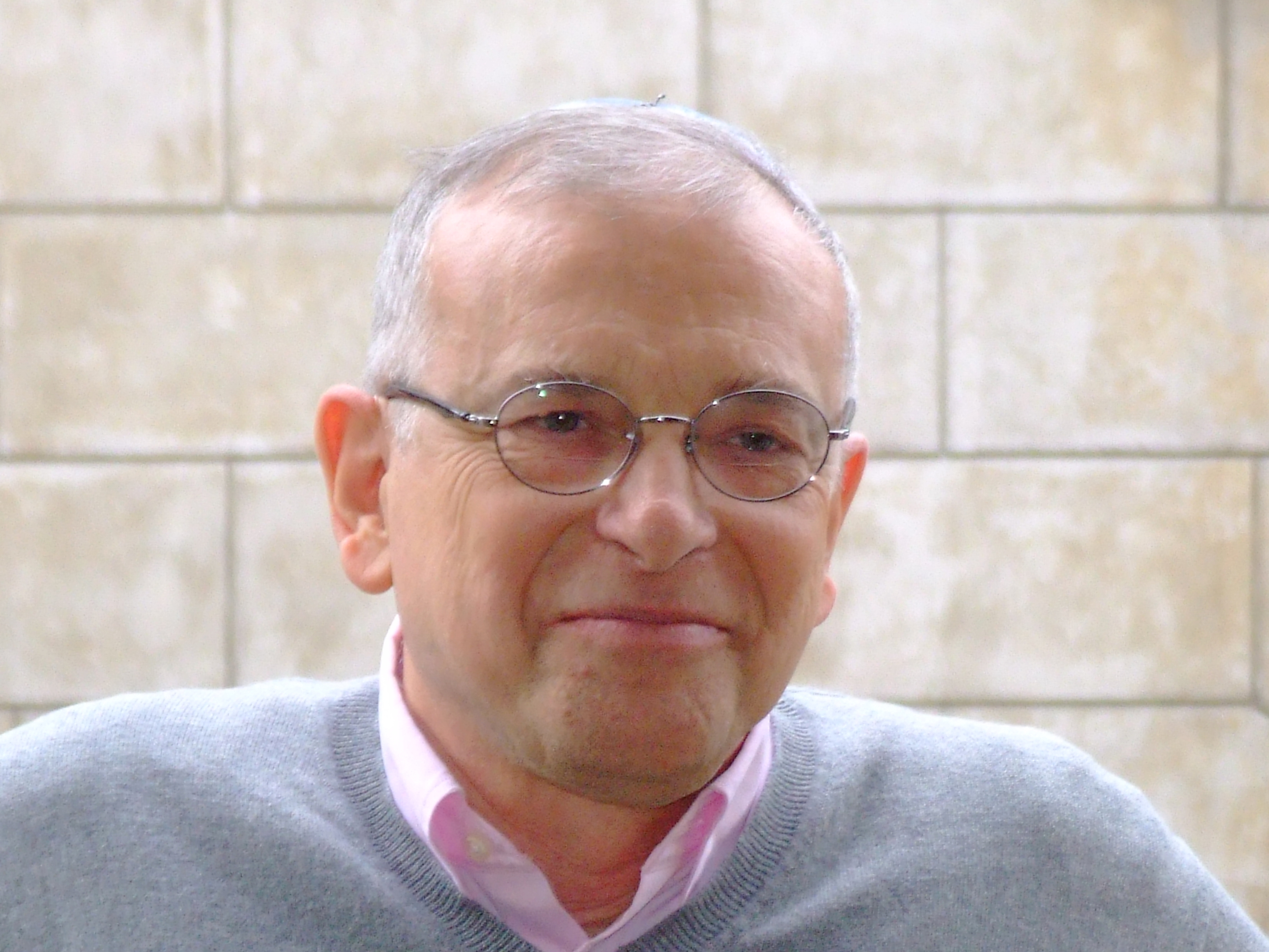
Moshe Rosman

Moshe Rosman (Hebrew: משה רוסמן; born 1949) is an Israeli historian specializing in the history of Polish Jews. He is a professor emeritus at the Department of Jewish History in Bar-Ilan University.

== Awards ==
1996: National Jewish Book Award in the Jewish History category for Founder of Hasidism: A Quest for the Historical Ba'al Shem Tov

2000: Milewski Foundation Prize (Poland)

2009: National Jewish Book Award (Collections)

2010: Jordan Schnitzer Award of the Association for Jewish Studies (co-winner with Francesca Trivellato)

2016: Honorary Doctorate, University of Wrocław

== Personal life ==
Moshe Rosman is an observant Jew and is married to Lynne Reed and father of six children.

He has settled in Israel in 1979 and currently lives in Jerusalem.
