= Bieliny, Świętokrzyskie Voivodeship =

Bieliny
- Village
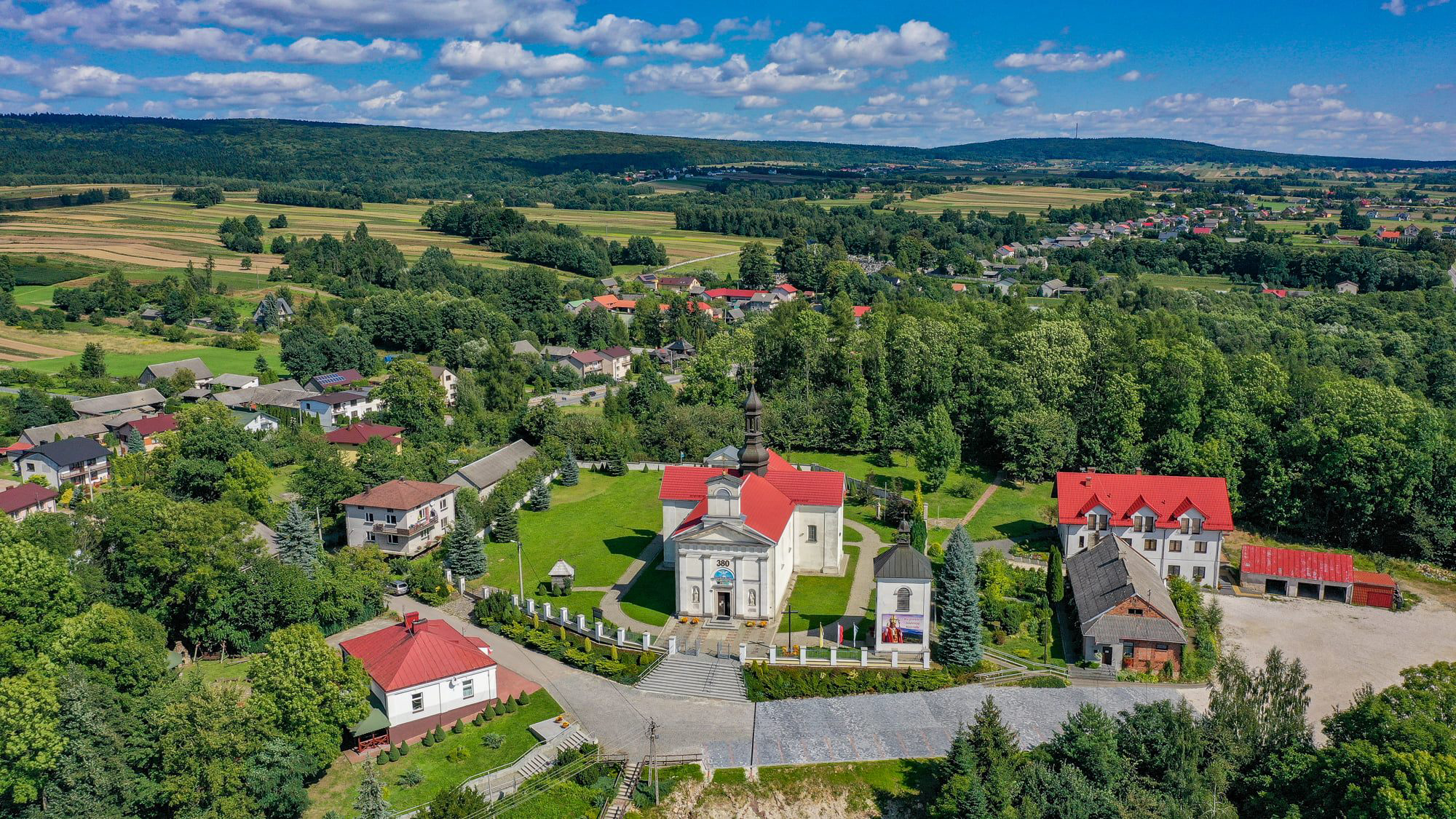

- Coat of arms

- Location within Poland
- Coordinates: 50°51′0″N 20°54′34″E
- Country: Poland
- Voivodeship: Świętokrzyskie
- County: Kielce
- Gmina: Bieliny
- Population: 1,900

Bieliny [bjɛˈlinɨ] is a village in Kielce County, Świętokrzyskie Voivodeship, in south-central Poland. It is the seat of the gmina (administrative district) called Gmina Bieliny. It lies approximately 21 km (13 mi) east of the regional capital Kielce. Bieliny is near the highest peaks of the Świętokrzyskie Mountains - Łysica, Agata and Łysa Góra.

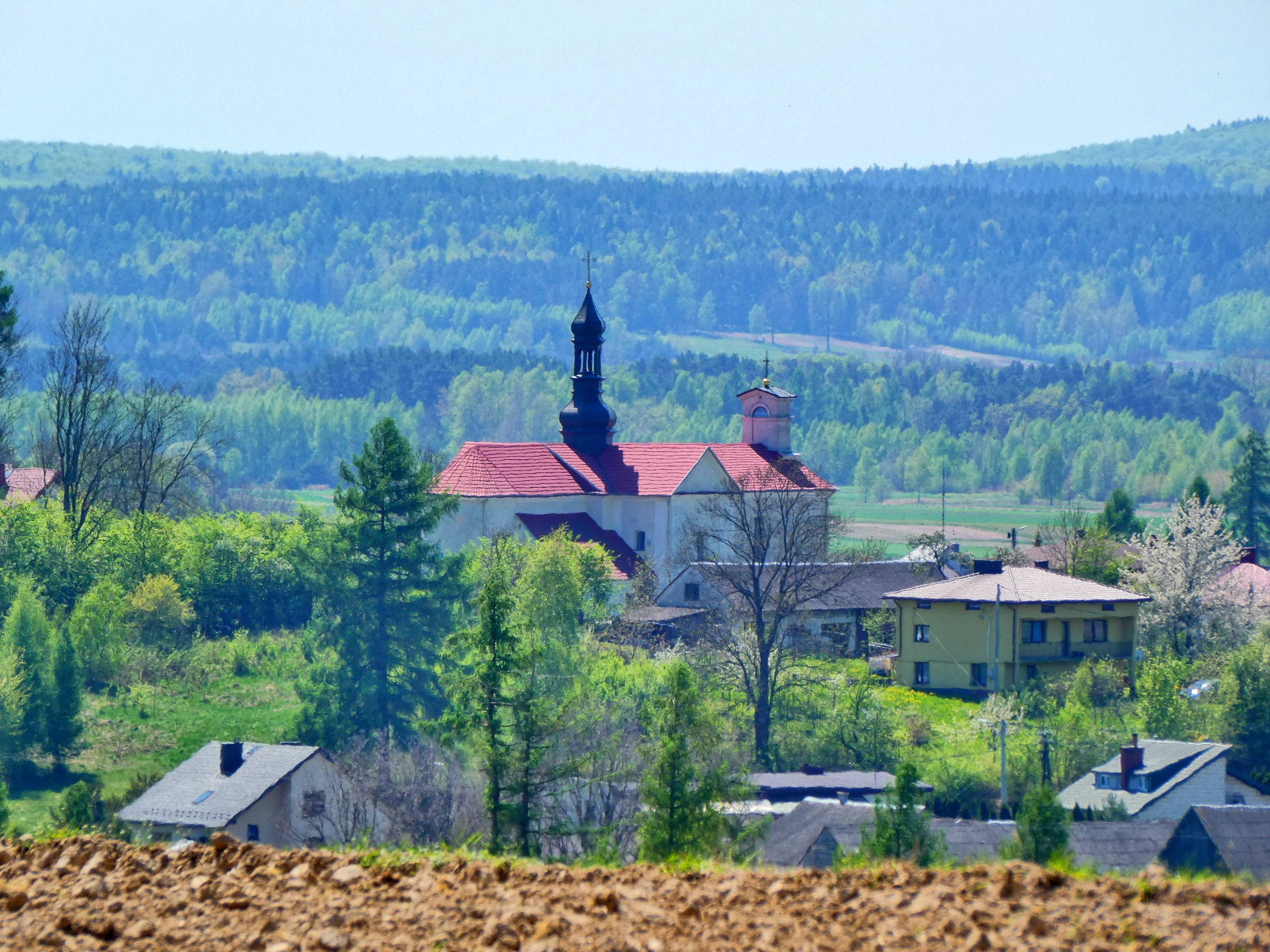
P1760830 Gmina Bieliny

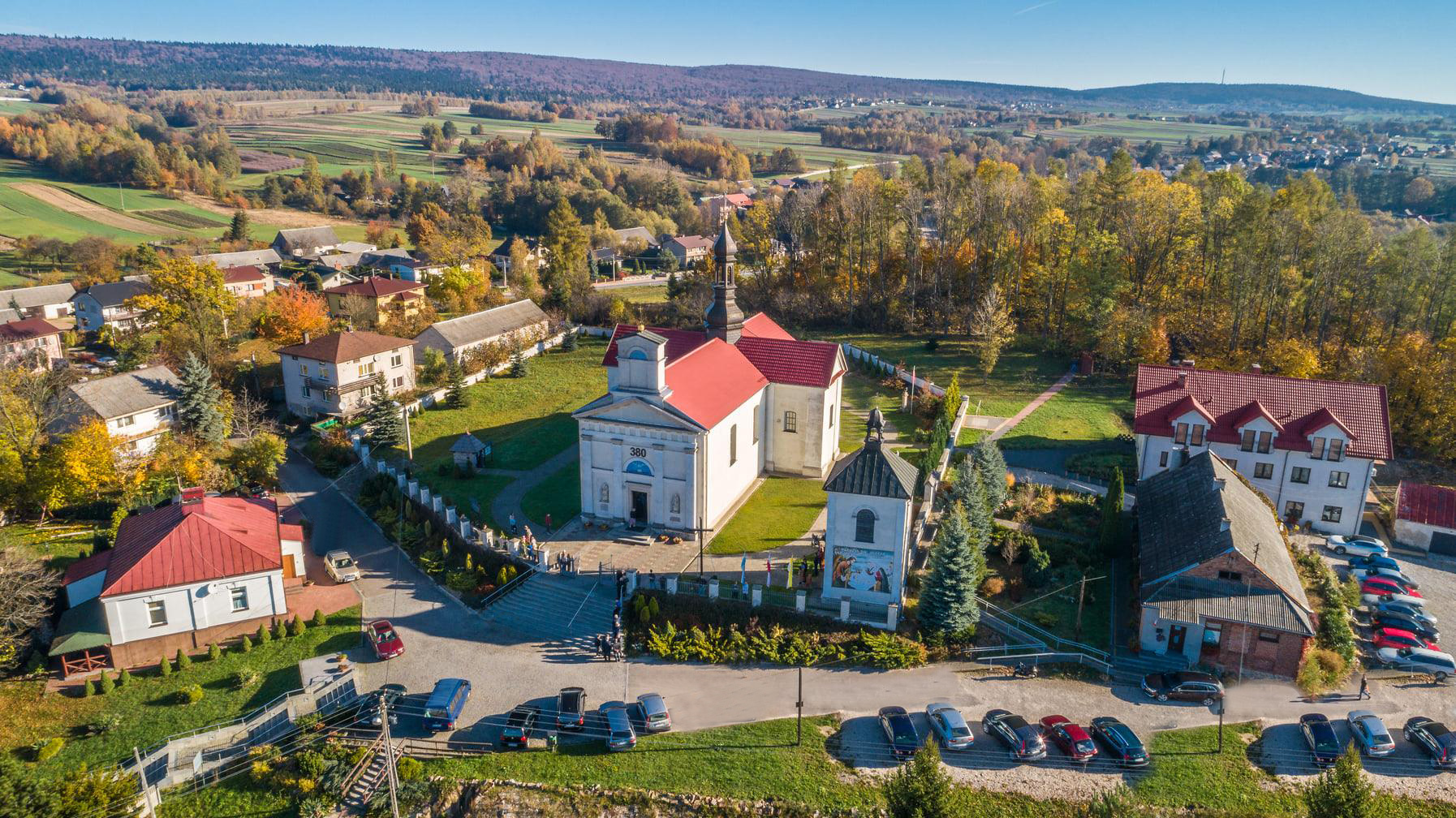
Bieliny parafia

== Monuments and other attractions ==
- Church of St. Joseph, an early Baroque church with a Classicist façade, built in 1637, extended from the west in 1838. The main altar contains a painting on boards of the Holy Family from the mid-17th century and two late Baroque side altars from the second half of the 18th century: the left altar contains a painting of the Virgin Mary with the Child from the first half of the 18th century, In the right one, there is a painting of the Crucifixion from the 17th century. Marble epitaph plates from the first half of the seventeenth century, brought to Bieliny from the monastery church of the Holy Cross, disassembled after the fire in 1777, are embedded in the wall of the main façade. Next to the church there is a historic cemetery.
- A 19th-century cottage in Kakonin - a perfectly preserved element of the Świętokrzyskie tradition and folk architecture. The cottage in Kakonin consists of three rooms arranged as: hallway - room - chamber. The interior of the cottage has been reconstructed on the basis of ethnographic and archival research and represents the living conditions of a middle-class farming family from the 19th century. The cottage was built around 1820 by Wojciech Samiec from fir logs on a foundation of field stones.
- Cemetery from the turn of the 18th/19th century (reg. no.: A.212 of 14.05.1992). Preserved tombstones and iron crosses from the turn of the 19th and 20th centuries. The oldest of them is a slab made of Chęciny limestone from 1824 which comes from the grave of the Paszkowski family, tenants of the Napęków manor and Promnik inheritors. Other historical monuments: a stone, neo-Gothic monument in the form of a tower to Rev. Karol Żurkowski, died in 1827 (the founder of the cemetery), a red sandstone cross made in 1835, tombstones of Walenty Pękalski and Wincenty Krawczyński, an antique sculpture of the Virgin Mary.
- Manor House - fir and larch manor house and buildings, erected in the first half of the 20th century in the folk manor style of writer Józef Ozga- Michalski. The buildings were constructed on the basis of the preserved fragments of the foundations of a much older building and a 200-year-old vaulted cellar. The object is located on the tourist route Świętokrzyski Literary Trail.
- A unique complex of 19th century antique chapels (The Chapel of the Blessed Virgin Mary from 1802, The Chapel of St. John Nepomucen from the second half of the 19th century, The Chapel of St. Rosalie covered with a hipped shingle roof)
- Świętokrzyski National Park
- Łysa Góra - the ruins of a pagan wall from 9th century, the Benedictine monastery Święty Krzyż from the 11th century

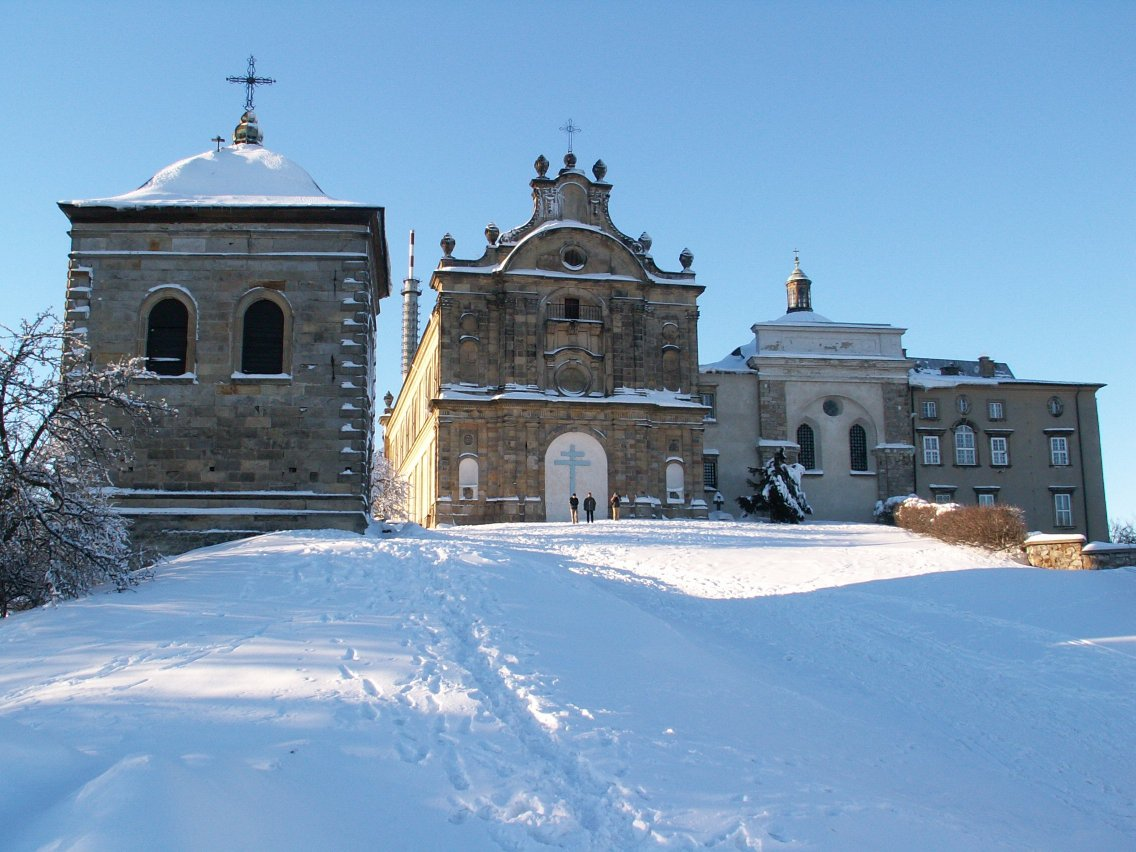
