= Osipovo =

Osipovo (Russian: Осипово) may refer to several rural localities in Russia:

- Osipovo, Vladimir Oblast, selo in Klyazminskoye Rural Settlement, Kovrovsky District, Vladimir Oblast
- Osipovo, Chagodoshchensky District, Vologda Oblast, village in Megrinskoye Rural Settlement, Chagodoshchensky District, Vologda Oblast
- Osipovo, Sokolsky District, Vologda Oblast, village in Dvinitskoye Rural Settlement, Sokolsky District, Vologda Oblast
- Osipovo, Vologodsky District, Vologda Oblast, village in Spasskoye Rural Settlement, Vologodsky District, Vologda Oblast
