= Yuzafova =

Yuzafova (Belarusian: Юзафова) or Yuzefovo (Russian: Юзeфовo) literally means "place that belongs to Józef". It may refer to the following places in Belarus:

- be:Юзафова (Верхнядзвінскі раён)
- be:Юзафова (Глыбоцкі раён)
- be:Юзафова (Германавіцкі сельсавет)
- be:Юзафова (Радзюкоўскі сельсавет)
- be:Юзафова (Астравецкі сельсавет)
- be:Юзафова (Трокеніцкі сельсавет)
- be:Юзафова (Глускі раён)
- be:Юзафова (Барысаўскі раён)
- be:Юзафова (Валожынскі раён)
- be:Юзафова (Крупскі раён)
- be:Юзафова (Смалявіцкі раён)

== See also ==
- Yuzufova
- Józefowo (disambiguation), Polish places with basically same name
- Osipovo, Russian equivalent
