= Dunaj =

Dunaj may refer to:

- Dunaj (wine), a variety of red grape grown mostly in Slovakia and bred by Dorota Pospíšilová in 1958 as a mixture of (Muscat Bouschet x Oporto) x St. Laurent
- Dunaj (band), a progressive rock band from the Czech Republic
- Dunaj, Krško, a small settlement in the Municipality of Krško in Slovenia
- Dunaj, Masovian Voivodeship, a Polish village
- Dunaj, Moravče, a former settlement in the Municipality of Moravče in Slovenia
- The Slovene name for Vienna
- Slavic names for the Danube River

== See also ==
- Dunay (disambiguation)
