= Korzybie =

Korzybie may refer to:

- Korzybie, Mława County, in Masovian Voivodeship (east-central Poland)
- Korzybie, Płońsk County, in Masovian Voivodeship (east-central Poland)
- Korzybie, Pomeranian Voivodeship (north Poland)

== See also ==
- Korzybski
