= Drogiszka =

- Village
- Location within Poland
- Coordinates: 52°57′N 20°22′E
- Country: Poland
- Voivodeship: Masovian
- County: Mława
- Gmina: Strzegowo

Drogiszka [drɔˈɡiʂka] is a village in the administrative district of Gmina Strzegowo, within Mława County, Masovian Voivodeship, in east-central Poland.
