= Korboniec =

- Village
- Location within Poland
- Coordinates: 53°6′N 20°19′E
- Country: Poland
- Voivodeship: Masovian
- County: Mława
- Gmina: Wiśniewo

Korboniec [kɔrˈbɔɲɛt͡s] is a village in the administrative district of Gmina Wiśniewo, within Mława County, Masovian Voivodeship, in east-central Poland.
