= Borowe, Mława County =

Borowe
- Village
- Location within Poland
- Coordinates: 53°6′N 20°17′E
- Country: Poland
- Voivodeship: Masovian
- County: Mława
- Gmina: Lipowiec Kościelny

Borowe [bɔˈrɔvɛ] is a village in the administrative district of Gmina Lipowiec Kościelny, within Mława County, Masovian Voivodeship, in east-central Poland.
