= Feliksowo, Masovian Voivodeship =

Feliksowo
- Settlement
- Location within Poland
- Coordinates: 52°58′12″N 20°26′28″E
- Country: Poland
- Voivodeship: Masovian
- County: Mława
- Gmina: Stupsk

Feliksowo [fɛlikˈsɔvɔ] is a settlement in the administrative district of Gmina Stupsk, within Mława County, Masovian Voivodeship, in east-central Poland.
