= Aleksandrowo, Mława County =

Aleksandrowo
- Village
- Location within Poland
- Coordinates: 52°55′37″N 20°19′14″E
- Country: Poland
- Voivodeship: Masovian
- County: Mława
- Gmina: Strzegowo

Population
  - Total: 15
- Time zone: UTC+1 (CET)
  - Summer (DST): UTC+2 (CEST)
- Vehicle registration: WML

Aleksandrowo [alɛksanˈdrɔvɔ] is a village in the administrative district of Gmina Strzegowo, within Mława County, Masovian Voivodeship, in north-central Poland.
