= Strzałkowo =

Strzałkowo can refer to three villages in Poland:

- Strzałkowo, Masovian Voivodeship (north-central Poland)
- Strzałkowo, Greater Poland Voivodeship (west-central Poland)
- Strzałkowo, Warmian-Masurian Voivodeship (north Poland)
