= Budy Sułkowskie, Mława County =

Budy Sułkowskie
- Village
- Location within Poland
- Coordinates: 52°58′N 20°24′E
- Country: Poland
- Voivodeship: Masovian
- County: Mława
- Gmina: Strzegowo

Budy Sułkowskie [ˈbudɨ suu̯ˈkɔfskʲɛ] is a village in the administrative district of Gmina Strzegowo, within Mława County, Masovian Voivodeship, in east-central Poland.
