= Morawy =

Morawy may refer to the following places:

- Morawy, the Polish name for Moravia
- Morawy, Kuyavian-Pomeranian Voivodeship (north-central Poland)
- Morawy, Masovian Voivodeship (east-central Poland)
- Morawy, Pomeranian Voivodeship (north Poland)
