= Topolewszczyzna =

- Village
- Location within Poland
- Coordinates: 52°51′39″N 20°20′55″E
- Country: Poland
- Voivodeship: Masovian
- County: Mława
- Gmina: Strzegowo

Topolewszczyzna [tɔpɔlɛfʂˈt͡ʂɨzna] is a village in the administrative district of Gmina Strzegowo, within Mława County, Masovian Voivodeship, in east-central Poland.
