= Krępa, Mława County =

Krępa
- Village
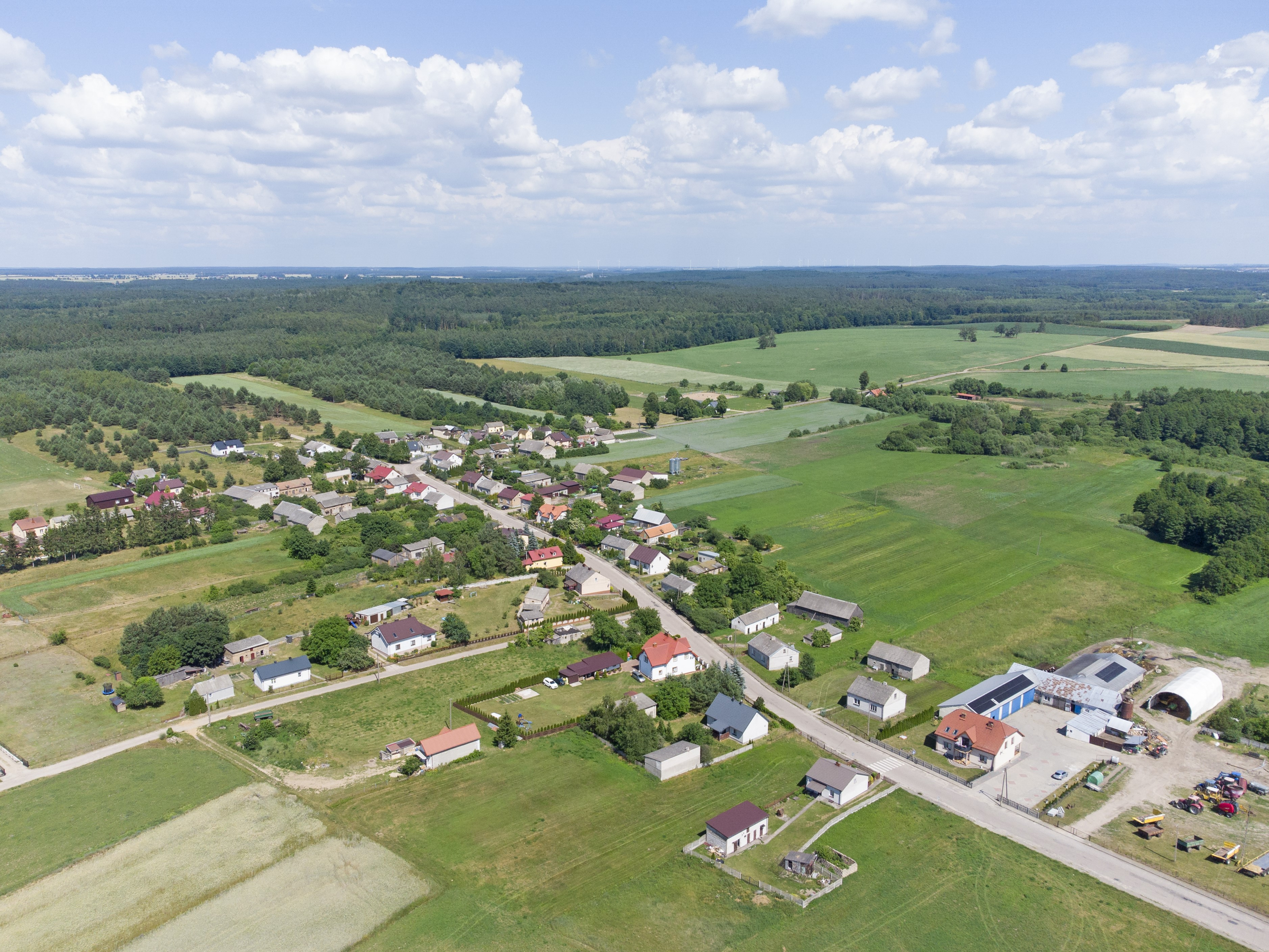
- Aerial view from south-east

- Location within Poland
- Coordinates: 53°9′N 20°14′E
- Country: Poland
- Voivodeship: Masovian
- County: Mława
- Gmina: Lipowiec Kościelny

Krępa [ˈkrɛmpa] is a village in the administrative district of Gmina Lipowiec Kościelny, within Mława County, Masovian Voivodeship, in east-central Poland.
