= Turza Wielka =

Turza Wielka may refer to the following places:

- Turza Wielka, Mława County in Masovian Voivodeship (east-central Poland)
- Turza Wielka, Płock County in Masovian Voivodeship (east-central Poland)
- Turza Wielka, Warmian-Masurian Voivodeship (north Poland)
