= Nowa Wieś, Mława County =

Nowa Wieś
- Village
- Location within Poland
- Coordinates: 53°07′05″N 20°25′19″E
- Country: Poland
- Voivodeship: Masovian
- County: Mława
- Gmina: Szydłowo

Nowa Wieś [ˈnɔva ˈvjɛɕ] is a village in the administrative district of Gmina Szydłowo, within Mława County, Masovian Voivodeship, in east-central Poland.
