= Kowalewo, Mława County =

Kowalewo
- Village
- Location within Poland
- Coordinates: 53°1′N 20°16′E
- Country: Poland
- Voivodeship: Masovian
- County: Mława
- Gmina: Wiśniewo
- Time zone: UTC+1 (CET)
  - Summer (DST): UTC+2 (CEST)
- Vehicle registration: WML

Kowalewo [kɔvaˈlɛvɔ] is a village in the administrative district of Gmina Wiśniewo, within Mława County, Masovian Voivodeship, in north-central Poland.

Two Polish citizens were murdered by Nazi Germany in the village during World War II.
