= Budy Strzegowskie =

- Village
- Location within Poland
- Coordinates: 52°53′56″N 20°19′13″E
- Country: Poland
- Voivodeship: Masovian
- County: Mława
- Gmina: Strzegowo

Budy Strzegowskie [ˈbudɨ stʂɛˈɡɔfskʲɛ] is a village in the administrative district of Gmina Strzegowo, within Mława County, Masovian Voivodeship, in east-central Poland.
