= Wola Kanigowska =

- Village
- Location within Poland
- Coordinates: 52°53′N 20°23′E
- Country: Poland
- Voivodeship: Masovian
- County: Mława
- Gmina: Strzegowo
- Time zone: UTC+1 (CET)
  - Summer (DST): UTC+2 (CEST)

Wola Kanigowska [ˈvɔla kaniˈɡɔfska] is a village in the administrative district of Gmina Strzegowo, within Mława County, Masovian Voivodeship, in north-central Poland.

Five Polish citizens were murdered by Nazi Germany in the village during World War II.
