= Nowa Sławogóra =

Village in Masovian Voivodeship, Poland

- Village
- Location within Poland
- Coordinates: 53°07′10″N 20°27′18″E
- Country: Poland
- Voivodeship: Masovian
- County: Mława
- Gmina: Szydłowo

Nowa Sławogóra [ˈnɔva swavɔˈɡura] is a village in the administrative district of Gmina Szydłowo, within Mława County, Masovian Voivodeship, in east-central Poland.
