= Trzcianka-Kolonia, Masovian Voivodeship =

Trzcianka-Kolonia
- Village
- Location within Poland
- Coordinates: 53°4′23″N 20°24′18″E
- Country: Poland
- Voivodeship: Masovian
- County: Mława
- Gmina: Szydłowo

Trzcianka-Kolonia [ˈtʂt͡ɕaŋka kɔˈlɔɲa] is a village in the administrative district of Gmina Szydłowo, within Mława County, Masovian Voivodeship, in east-central Poland.
