= Trzcianka, Mława County =

Trzcianka
- Village
- Location within Poland
- Coordinates: 53°4′50″N 20°25′5″E
- Country: Poland
- Voivodeship: Masovian
- County: Mława
- Gmina: Szydłowo

Trzcianka [ˈtʂt͡ɕaŋka] is a village in the administrative district of Gmina Szydłowo, within Mława County, Masovian Voivodeship, in east-central Poland.
