= Kęczewo =

- Village
- Location within Poland
- Coordinates: 53°8′N 20°10′E
- Country: Poland
- Voivodeship: Masovian
- County: Mława
- Gmina: Lipowiec Kościelny
- Population: 400

Kęczewo [kɛnˈt͡ʂɛvɔ] is a village in the administrative district of Gmina Lipowiec Kościelny, within Mława County, Masovian Voivodeship, in east-central Poland.
