= Sułkowo-Kolonia =

- Village
- Location within Poland
- Coordinates: 52°58′N 20°26′E
- Country: Poland
- Voivodeship: Masovian
- County: Mława
- Gmina: Stupsk

Sułkowo-Kolonia [suu̯ˈkɔvɔ kɔˈlɔɲa] is a village in the administrative district of Gmina Stupsk, within Mława County, Masovian Voivodeship, in east-central Poland.
