= Rosochy, Masovian Voivodeship =

Rosochy
- Village
- Location within Poland
- Coordinates: 52°59′N 20°29′E
- Country: Poland
- Voivodeship: Masovian
- County: Mława
- Gmina: Stupsk

Rosochy [rɔˈsɔxɨ] is a village in the administrative district of Gmina Stupsk, within Mława County, Masovian Voivodeship, in east-central Poland.
