= Stare Niemyje, Masovian Voivodeship =

Stare Niemyje
- Village
- Location within Poland
- Coordinates: 53°8′19″N 20°32′9″E
- Country: Poland
- Voivodeship: Masovian
- County: Mława
- Gmina: Szydłowo
- Population: 30

Stare Niemyje [ˈstarɛ ɲɛˈmɨjɛ] is a village in the administrative district of Gmina Szydłowo, within Mława County, Masovian Voivodeship, in east-central Poland.
