= Józefowo =

Józefowo may refer to:

- Józefowo, Aleksandrów County in Kuyavian-Pomeranian Voivodeship (north-central Poland)
- Józefowo, Toruń County in Kuyavian-Pomeranian Voivodeship (north-central Poland)
- Józefowo, Gmina Izbica Kujawska in Kuyavian-Pomeranian Voivodeship (central Poland)
- Józefowo, Gmina Włocławek in Kuyavian-Pomeranian Voivodeship (central Poland)
- Józefowo, Gmina Lubraniec in Kuyavian-Pomeranian Voivodeship (central Poland)
- Józefowo, Mogilno County in Kuyavian-Pomeranian Voivodeship (north-central Poland)
- Józefowo, Augustów County in Podlaskie Voivodeship (north-east Poland)
- Józefowo, Białystok County in Podlaskie Voivodeship (north-east Poland)
- Józefowo, Kolno County in Podlaskie Voivodeship (north-east Poland)
- Józefowo, Suwałki County in Podlaskie Voivodeship (north-east Poland)
- Józefowo, Gmina Lipowiec Kościelny in Masovian Voivodeship (north-central Poland)
- Józefowo, Gmina Radzanów in Masovian Voivodeship (north-central Poland)
- Józefowo, Gmina Strzegowo in Masovian Voivodeship (north-central Poland)
- Józefowo, Płońsk County in Masovian Voivodeship (east-central Poland)
- Józefowo, Przasnysz County in Masovian Voivodeship (north-central Poland)
- Józefowo, Sierpc County in Masovian Voivodeship (north-central Poland)
- Józefowo, Wyszków County in Masovian Voivodeship (east-central Poland)
- Józefowo, Ostrołęka County in Masovian Voivodeship (east-central Poland)
- Józefowo, Chodzież County in Greater Poland Voivodeship (west-central Poland)
- Józefowo, Gostyń County in Greater Poland Voivodeship (west-central Poland)
- Józefowo, Gmina Babiak in Greater Poland Voivodeship (central Poland)
- Józefowo, Gmina Kleczew in Greater Poland Voivodeship (west-central Poland)
- Józefowo, Gmina Rzgów in Greater Poland Voivodeship (west-central Poland)
- Józefowo, Gmina Przedecz in Greater Poland Voivodeship (central Poland)
- Józefowo, Międzychód County in Greater Poland Voivodeship (west-central Poland)
- Józefowo, Nowy Tomyśl County in Greater Poland Voivodeship (west-central Poland)
- Józefowo, Słupca County in Greater Poland Voivodeship (west-central Poland)
- Józefowo, Szamotuły County in Greater Poland Voivodeship (west-central Poland)
- Józefowo, Gmina Zaniemyśl, Środa County in Greater Poland Voivodeship (west-central Poland)
- Józefowo, Wągrowiec County in Greater Poland Voivodeship (west-central Poland)
- Józefowo, Złotów County in Greater Poland Voivodeship (west-central Poland)
- Józefowo, Pomeranian Voivodeship (north Poland)
- Józefowo, Braniewo County in Warmian-Masurian Voivodeship (north Poland)
- Józefowo, Elbląg County in Warmian-Masurian Voivodeship (north Poland)
- Józefowo, Olsztyn County in Warmian-Masurian Voivodeship (north Poland)
