= Turza Mała =

Turza Mała may refer to the following places:

- Turza Mała, Mława County in Masovian Voivodeship (east-central Poland)
- Turza Mała, Płock County in Masovian Voivodeship (east-central Poland)
- Turza Mała, Warmian-Masurian Voivodeship (north Poland)
