= Sujki =

Sójki
- Village
- Location within Poland
- Coordinates: 52°52′35″N 20°21′55″E
- Country: Poland
- Voivodeship: Masovian
- County: Mława
- Gmina: Strzegowo

Sójki [ˈsui̯ki] is a village in the administrative district of Gmina Strzegowo, within Mława County, Masovian Voivodeship, in east-central Poland.
