= Radzimowice =

Radzimowice may refer to the following places in Poland:

- Radzimowice, Lower Silesian Voivodeship
- Radzimowice, Masovian Voivodeship
