= Kuskowo-Glinki =

- Village
- Location within Poland
- Coordinates: 52°53′22.2″N 20°19′18.4″E
- Country: Poland
- Voivodeship: Masovian
- County: Mława
- Gmina: Strzegowo

Population
  - Total: 100
- Time zone: UTC+1 (CET)
  - Summer (DST): UTC+2 (CEST)

Kuskowo-Glinki [kusˈkɔvɔ ˈɡlinki] is a village in the administrative district of Gmina Strzegowo, within Mława County, Masovian Voivodeship, in north-central Poland.

One Polish citizen was murdered by Nazi Germany in the village during World War II.
