= Cegielnia Lewicka =

- Village
- Location within Poland
- Coordinates: 53°7′42″N 20°18′37″E
- Country: Poland
- Voivodeship: Masovian
- County: Mława
- Gmina: Lipowiec Kościelny
- Population: 70

Cegielnia Lewicka [t͡sɛˈɡʲɛlɲa lɛˈvit͡ska] is a village in the administrative district of Gmina Lipowiec Kościelny, within Mława County, Masovian Voivodeship, in east-central Poland.
