= Budy Mdzewskie =

- Village
- Location within Poland
- Coordinates: 52°57′22″N 20°18′44″E
- Country: Poland
- Voivodeship: Masovian
- County: Mława
- Gmina: Strzegowo

Budy Mdzewskie [ˈbudɨ ˈmd͡zɛfskʲɛ] is a village in the administrative district of Gmina Strzegowo, within Mława County, Masovian Voivodeship, in east-central Poland.
