= Olszewo-Chlebowo =

- Settlement
- Location within Poland
- Coordinates: 53°02′18″N 20°29′14″E
- Country: Poland
- Voivodeship: Masovian
- County: Mława
- Gmina: Stupsk

Olszewo-Chlebowo [ɔlˈʂɛvɔ xlɛˈbɔvɔ] is a settlement in the administrative district of Gmina Stupsk, within Mława County, Masovian Voivodeship, in east-central Poland.

From 1975–1998 the town administratively belonged to the Ciechanów Voivodeship.
