= Wola-Kolonia =

- Village
- Location within Poland
- Coordinates: 53°3′N 20°25′E
- Country: Poland
- Voivodeship: Masovian
- County: Mława
- Gmina: Stupsk

Wola-Kolonia [ˈvɔla kɔˈlɔɲa] is a village in the administrative district of Gmina Stupsk, within Mława County, Masovian Voivodeship, in east-central Poland.
