= Żmijewo-Szawły =

- Village
- Location within Poland
- Coordinates: 53°00′35″N 20°30′14″E
- Country: Poland
- Voivodeship: Masovian
- County: Mława
- Gmina: Stupsk

Żmijewo-Szawły [ʐmiˈjɛvɔ ˈʂavwɨ] is a village in the administrative district of Gmina Stupsk, within Mława County, Masovian Voivodeship, in east-central Poland.
