= Parcele Łomskie =

- Village
- Location within Poland
- Coordinates: 53°7′N 20°19′E
- Country: Poland
- Voivodeship: Masovian
- County: Mława
- Gmina: Lipowiec Kościelny

Parcele Łomskie [parˈt͡sɛlɛ ˈwɔmskʲɛ] is a village in the administrative district of Gmina Lipowiec Kościelny, within Mława County, Masovian Voivodeship, in east-central Poland.
