= Stefankowo =

- Village
- Location within Poland
- Coordinates: 52°58′42″N 20°25′24″E
- Country: Poland
- Voivodeship: Masovian
- County: Mława
- Gmina: Stupsk

Stefankowo [stɛfaŋˈkɔvɔ] is a village in the administrative district of Gmina Stupsk, within Mława County, Masovian Voivodeship, in east-central Poland.
