= Tuchowo =

- Village
- Location within Poland
- Coordinates: 52°52′37″N 20°15′16″E
- Country: Poland
- Voivodeship: Masovian
- County: Mława
- Gmina: Strzegowo

Tuchowo [tuˈxɔvɔ] is a village in the administrative district of Gmina Strzegowo, within Mława County, Masovian Voivodeship, in east-central Poland.
