= Marianowo, Gmina Strzegowo =

Marianowo
- Village
- Location within Poland
- Coordinates: 52°53′13″N 20°22′2″E
- Country: Poland
- Voivodeship: Masovian
- County: Mława
- Gmina: Strzegowo
- Population: 20

Marianowo [marjaˈnɔvɔ] is a village in the administrative district of Gmina Strzegowo, within Mława County, Masovian Voivodeship, in east-central Poland.
