= Stara Sławogóra =

- Village
- Location within Poland
- Coordinates: 53°7′57″N 20°27′16″E
- Country: Poland
- Voivodeship: Masovian
- County: Mława
- Gmina: Szydłowo
- Population: 190

Stara Sławogóra [ˈstara swavɔˈɡura] is a village in the administrative district of Gmina Szydłowo, within Mława County, Masovian Voivodeship, in east-central Poland.
