= Nowopole, Mława County =

Nowopole
- Village
- Location within Poland
- Coordinates: 52°50′47″N 20°16′07″E
- Country: Poland
- Voivodeship: Masovian
- County: Mława
- Gmina: Strzegowo

Nowopole [nɔvɔˈpɔlɛ] is a village in the administrative district of Gmina Strzegowo, within Mława County, Masovian Voivodeship, in east-central Poland.
