= Budy Budzkie =

- Village
- Location within Poland
- Coordinates: 52°55′47″N 20°14′26″E
- Country: Poland
- Voivodeship: Masovian
- County: Mława
- Gmina: Strzegowo

Budy Budzkie [ˈbudɨ ˈbut͡skʲɛ] is a village in the administrative district of Gmina Strzegowo, within Mława County, Masovian Voivodeship, in east-central Poland.
