= Breginie =

- Village
- Location within Poland
- Coordinates: 52°54′N 20°12′E
- Country: Poland
- Voivodeship: Masovian
- County: Mława
- Gmina: Strzegowo

Breginie [brɛˈɡiɲɛ] is a village in the administrative district of Gmina Strzegowo, within Mława County, Masovian Voivodeship, in east-central Poland.
