= Sułkowo-Baraki =

- Village
- Location within Poland
- Coordinates: 52°58′00″N 20°25′16″E
- Country: Poland
- Voivodeship: Masovian
- County: Mława
- Gmina: Stupsk

Sułkowo-Baraki [suu̯ˈkɔvɔ baˈraki] is a village in the administrative district of Gmina Stupsk, within Mława County, Masovian Voivodeship, in east-central Poland.
