= Stara Otocznia =

- Village
- Location within Poland
- Coordinates: 53°5′N 20°22′E
- Country: Poland
- Voivodeship: Masovian
- County: Mława
- Gmina: Wiśniewo

Stara Otocznia [ˈstara ɔˈtɔt͡ʂɲa] is a village in the administrative district of Gmina Wiśniewo, within Mława County, Masovian Voivodeship, in east-central Poland.
