= Gatka, Mława County =

Gatka
- Village
- Location within Poland
- Coordinates: 52°58′43″N 20°19′59″E
- Country: Poland
- Voivodeship: Masovian
- County: Mława
- Gmina: Strzegowo

Gatka (Polish pronunciation: [ˈɡatka]) is a village in the administrative district of Gmina Strzegowo, within Mława County, Masovian Voivodeship, in east-central Poland.
