= Olszewo-Reszki =

- Village
- Location within Poland
- Coordinates: 53°1′34″N 20°29′13″E
- Country: Poland
- Voivodeship: Masovian
- County: Mława
- Gmina: Stupsk
- Population: 50

Olszewo-Reszki [ɔlˈʂɛvɔ ˈrɛʂki] is a village in the administrative district of Gmina Stupsk, within Mława County, Masovian Voivodeship, in east-central Poland.
