= Budy Kowalewkowskie =

- Village
- Location within Poland
- Coordinates: 52°54′28.39″N 20°14′52.41″E
- Country: Poland
- Voivodeship: Masovian
- County: Mława
- Gmina: Strzegowo

Budy Kowalewkowskie [ˈbudɨ kɔvalɛfˈkɔfskʲɛ] is a village in the administrative district of Gmina Strzegowo, within Mława County, Masovian Voivodeship, in east-central Poland.
