= Marysinek, Gmina Strzegowo =

Marysinek
- Village
- Location within Poland
- Coordinates: 52°56′21″N 20°21′53″E
- Country: Poland
- Voivodeship: Masovian
- County: Mława
- Gmina: Strzegowo
- Population: 100

Marysinek [marɨˈɕinɛk] is a village in the administrative district of Gmina Strzegowo, within Mława County, Masovian Voivodeship, in east-central Poland.
