= Giżyn =

Giżyn may refer to the following places:

- Giżyn, Greater Poland Voivodeship (west-central Poland)
- Giżyn, Masovian Voivodeship (north-central Poland)
- Giżyn, Myślibórz County in West Pomeranian Voivodeship (north-west Poland)
- Giżyn, Pyrzyce County in West Pomeranian Voivodeship (north-west Poland)
