= Zawady, Gmina Lipowiec Kościelny =

Zawady
- Village
- Location within Poland
- Coordinates: 53°4′N 20°11′E
- Country: Poland
- Voivodeship: Masovian
- County: Mława
- Gmina: Lipowiec Kościelny

Zawady [zaˈvadɨ] is a village in the administrative district of Gmina Lipowiec Kościelny, within Mława County, Masovian Voivodeship, in east-central Poland.
