= Dunay =

Dunay may refer to:

- Dunay, an ancient Slovenian river
- The Danube River
- Dunay, Iran (disambiguation), places in Iran
- Dunay (inhabited locality), name of several inhabited localities in Russia
- Soviet training ship Dunay, a Soviet tall ship
- Dunay radar, a Soviet missile defense radar

== See also ==
- Dunaj (disambiguation)
