= Szydłówek, Mława County =

Szydłówek
- Village
- Location within Poland
- Coordinates: 53°05′41″N 20°26′20″E
- Country: Poland
- Voivodeship: Masovian
- County: Mława
- Gmina: Szydłowo

Szydłówek [ʂɨdˈwuvɛk] is a village in the administrative district of Gmina Szydłowo, within Mława County, Masovian Voivodeship, in east-central Poland.
