= Jeże, Masovian Voivodeship =

Jeże
- Village
- Location within Poland
- Coordinates: 53°2′N 20°28′E
- Country: Poland
- Voivodeship: Masovian
- County: Mława
- Gmina: Stupsk

Jeże [ˈjɛʐɛ] is a village in the administrative district of Gmina Stupsk, within Mława County, Masovian Voivodeship, in east-central Poland.
