= Nosarzewo Polne =

- Village
- Location within Poland
- Coordinates: 53°5′N 20°31′E
- Country: Poland
- Voivodeship: Masovian
- County: Mława
- Gmina: Szydłowo

Nosarzewo Polne [nɔsaˈʐɛvɔ ˈpɔlnɛ] is a village in the administrative district of Gmina Szydłowo, within Mława County, Masovian Voivodeship, in east-central Poland.
