= Niegocin, Masovian Voivodeship =

Niegocin
- Village
- Location within Poland
- Coordinates: 53°4′N 20°10′E
- Country: Poland
- Voivodeship: Masovian
- County: Mława
- Gmina: Lipowiec Kościelny

Niegocin [ɲɛˈɡɔt͡ɕin] is a village in the administrative district of Gmina Lipowiec Kościelny, within Mława County, Masovian Voivodeship, in east-central Poland.
