= Budy Wolińskie =

- Village
- Location within Poland
- Coordinates: 52°52′N 20°24′E
- Country: Poland
- Voivodeship: Masovian
- County: Mława
- Gmina: Strzegowo

Budy Wolińskie [ˈbudɨ vɔˈliɲskʲɛ] is a village in the administrative district of Gmina Strzegowo, within Mława County, Masovian Voivodeship, in east-central Poland.
