= Dąbrowa, Mława County =

Dąbrowa
- Village
- Location within Poland
- Coordinates: 52°57′58″N 20°16′40″E
- Country: Poland
- Voivodeship: Masovian
- County: Mława
- Gmina: Strzegowo

Dąbrowa [dɔmˈbrɔva] is a village in the administrative district of Gmina Strzegowo, within Mława County, Masovian Voivodeship, in east-central Poland.
