= Rudowo, Mława County =

Rudowo
- Village
- Location within Poland
- Coordinates: 52°57′N 20°13′E
- Country: Poland
- Voivodeship: Masovian
- County: Mława
- Gmina: Strzegowo

Rudowo [ruˈdɔvɔ] is a village in the administrative district of Gmina Strzegowo, within Mława County, Masovian Voivodeship, in east-central Poland.
