= Giżynek, Masovian Voivodeship =

Giżynek
- Village
- Location within Poland
- Coordinates: 52°51′N 20°19′E
- Country: Poland
- Voivodeship: Masovian
- County: Mława
- Gmina: Strzegowo

Giżynek [ɡiˈʐɨnɛk] is a village in the administrative district of Gmina Strzegowo, within Mława County, Masovian Voivodeship, in east-central Poland.
