= Kozłowo, Mława County =

Kozłowo
- Village
- Location within Poland
- Coordinates: 52°54′35″N 20°25′10″E
- Country: Poland
- Voivodeship: Masovian
- County: Mława
- Gmina: Strzegowo

Kozłowo [kɔˈzwɔvɔ] is a village in the administrative district of Gmina Strzegowo, within Mława County, Masovian Voivodeship, in east-central Poland.

In the years 1975–1998 Kozłowo administratively belonged to the Ciechanów Voivodeship.
