= Zalesie, Gmina Strzegowo =

Zalesie
- Village
- Location within Poland
- Coordinates: 53°00′08″N 20°17′39″E
- Country: Poland
- Voivodeship: Masovian
- County: Mława
- Gmina: Strzegowo

Zalesie [zaˈlɛɕɛ] is a village in the administrative district of Gmina Strzegowo, within Mława County, Masovian Voivodeship, in east-central Poland.
