= Wola Dębska =

- Village
- Location within Poland
- Coordinates: 53°8′N 20°32′E
- Country: Poland
- Voivodeship: Masovian
- County: Mława
- Gmina: Szydłowo

Wola Dębska [ˈvɔla ˈdɛmpska] is a village in the administrative district of Gmina Szydłowo, within Mława County, Masovian Voivodeship, in east-central Poland.
