= Dobra Wola, Mława County =

Dobra Wola
- Village
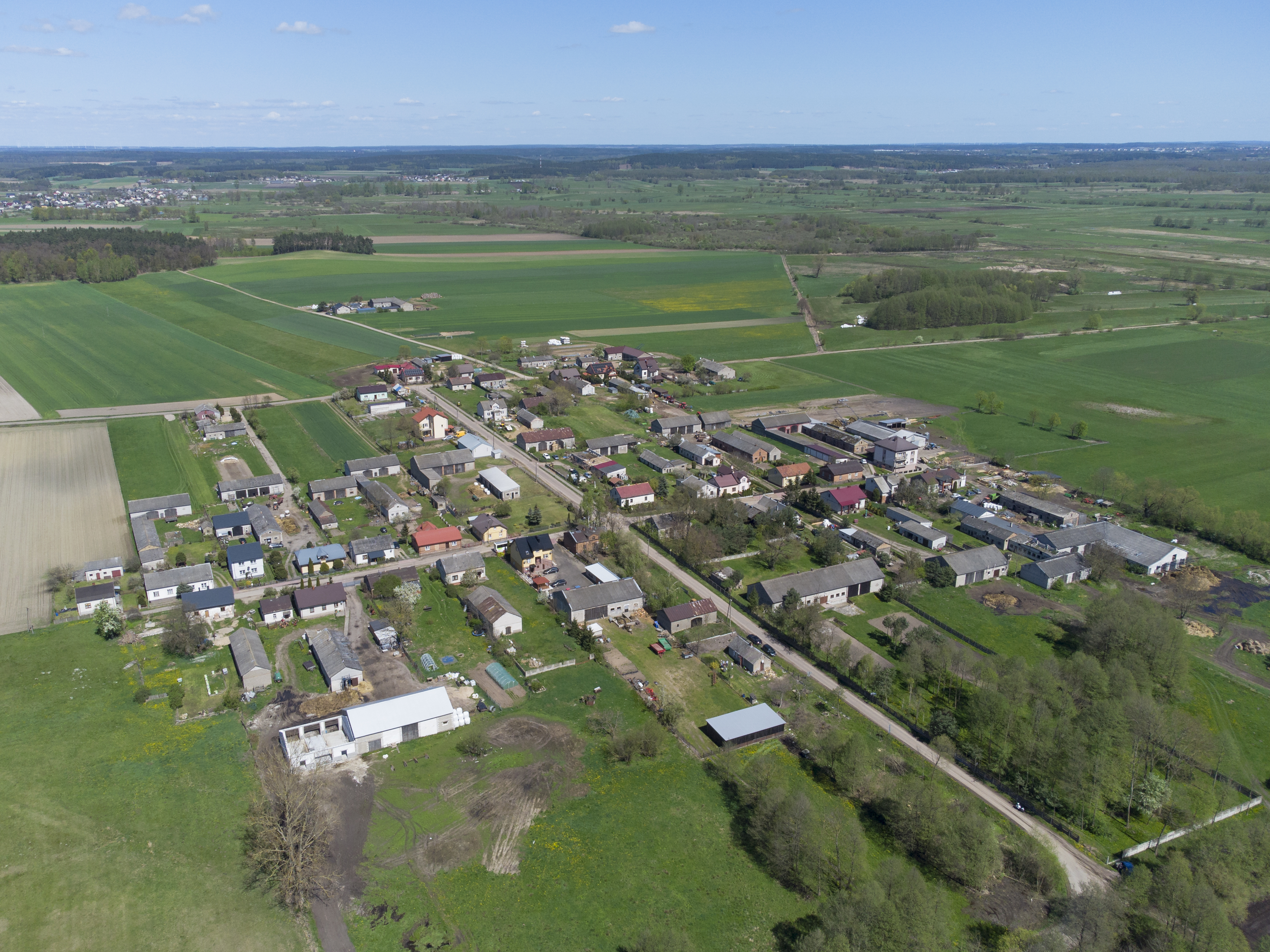

- Location within Poland
- Coordinates: 53°5′N 20°13′E
- Country: Poland
- Voivodeship: Masovian
- County: Mława
- Gmina: Lipowiec Kościelny

Dobra Wola [ˈdɔbra ˈvɔla] is a village in the administrative district of Gmina Lipowiec Kościelny, within Mława County, Masovian Voivodeship, in east-central Poland.
