= Baranek, Masovian Voivodeship =

Baranek
- Village
- Location within Poland
- Coordinates: 52°50′42″N 20°18′20″E
- Country: Poland
- Voivodeship: Masovian
- County: Mława
- Gmina: Strzegowo

Baranek [baˈranɛk] is a village in the administrative district of Gmina Strzegowo, within Mława County, Masovian Voivodeship, in east-central Poland.
