= Rydzyn Włościański =

- Village
- Location within Poland
- Coordinates: 52°54′04″N 20°14′23″E
- Country: Poland
- Voivodeship: Masovian
- County: Mława
- Gmina: Strzegowo

Rydzyn Włościański (Polish pronunciation: [ˈrɨdzɨn vwɔɕˈtɕaj̃skʲi]) is a village in the administrative district of Gmina Strzegowo, within Mława County, Masovian Voivodeship, in east-central Poland.
