= Kowalewko, Mława County =

Kowalewko
- Village
- Location within Poland
- Coordinates: 52°59′40″N 20°16′19″E
- Country: Poland
- Voivodeship: Masovian
- County: Mława
- Gmina: Strzegowo
- Time zone: UTC+1 (CET)
  - Summer (DST): UTC+2 (CEST)
- Postal code: 06-445
- Vehicle registration: WML

Kowalewko [kɔvaˈlɛfkɔ] is a village in the administrative district of Gmina Strzegowo, within Mława County, Masovian Voivodeship, in north-central Poland.

== History ==
During the German occupation in World War II, the occupiers operated a forced labour camp for Poles and Jews in the village from May to October 1942.
