= Leszczyna, Masovian Voivodeship =

Leszczyna
- Village
- Location within Poland
- Coordinates: 52°53′01″N 20°21′07″E
- Country: Poland
- Voivodeship: Masovian
- County: Mława
- Gmina: Strzegowo
- Population: 60

Leszczyna [lɛʂˈt͡ʂɨna] is a village in the administrative district of Gmina Strzegowo, within Mława County, Masovian Voivodeship, in east-central Poland.
