= Żmijewo-Podusie =

- Village
- Location within Poland
- Coordinates: 52°59′57″N 20°30′48″E
- Country: Poland
- Voivodeship: Masovian
- County: Mława
- Gmina: Stupsk

Żmijewo-Podusie [ʐmiˈjɛvɔ pɔˈduɕɛ] is a village in the administrative district of Gmina Stupsk, within Mława County, Masovian Voivodeship, in east-central Poland.
