= Unikowo, Masovian Voivodeship =

Unikowo
- Village
- Location within Poland
- Coordinates: 52°56′N 20°26′E
- Country: Poland
- Voivodeship: Masovian
- County: Mława
- Gmina: Strzegowo

Unikowo [uniˈkɔvɔ] is a village in the administrative district of Gmina Strzegowo, within Mława County, Masovian Voivodeship, in east-central Poland.
