= Giełczyn, Masovian Voivodeship =

Giełczyn
- Village
- Location within Poland
- Coordinates: 52°55′N 20°13′E
- Country: Poland
- Voivodeship: Masovian
- County: Mława
- Gmina: Strzegowo

Giełczyn [ˈɡʲɛu̯t͡ʂɨn] is a village in the administrative district of Gmina Strzegowo, within Mława County, Masovian Voivodeship, in east-central Poland.
