= Lewiczyn, Mława County =

Lewiczyn
- Village
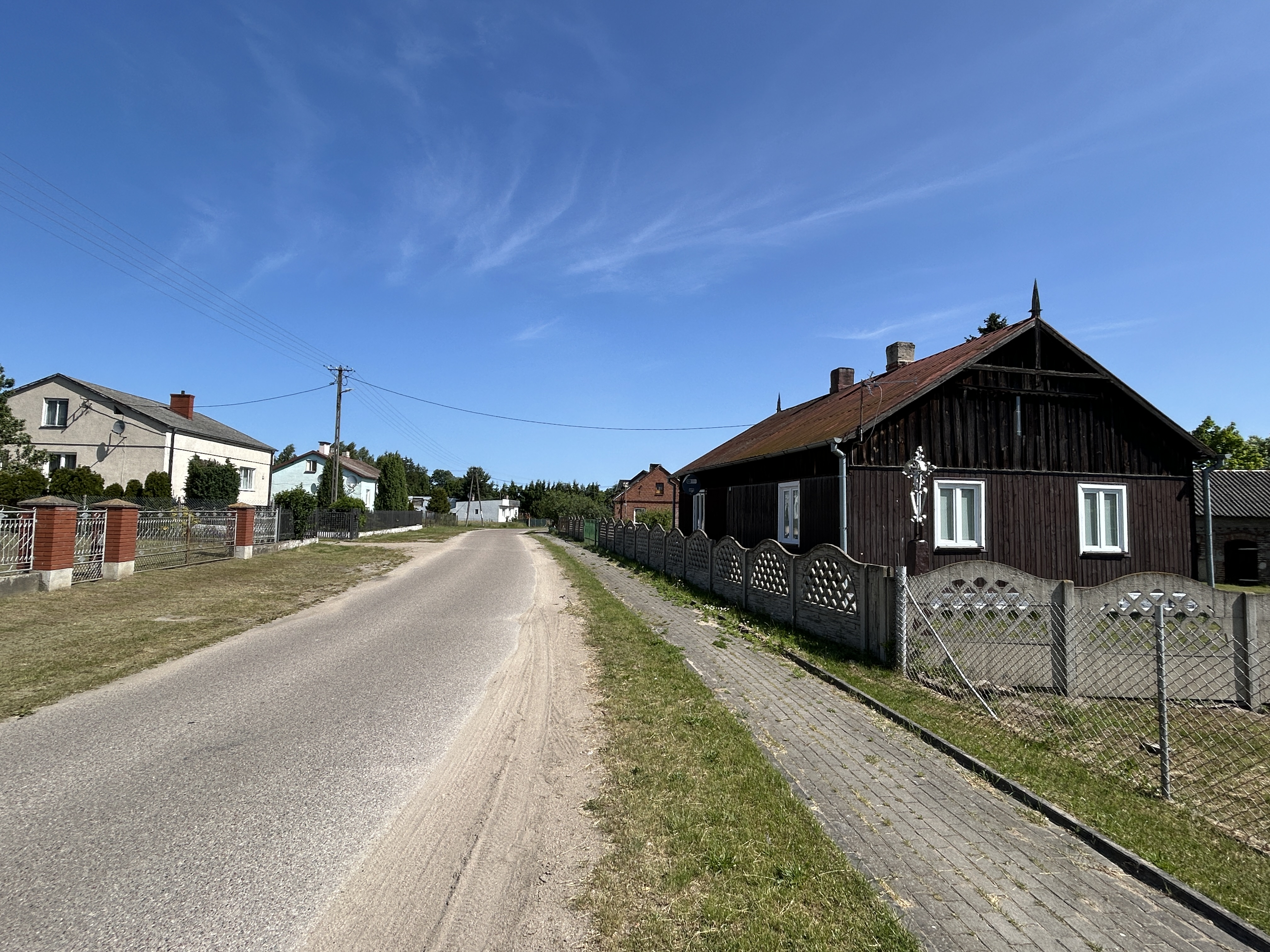

- Location within Poland
- Coordinates: 53°8′N 20°16′E
- Country: Poland
- Voivodeship: Masovian
- County: Mława
- Gmina: Lipowiec Kościelny
- Time zone: UTC+1 (CET)
  - Summer (DST): UTC+2 (CEST)
- Postal code: 06-545
- Vehicle registration: WML

Lewiczyn [lɛˈvit͡ʂɨn] is a village in the administrative district of Gmina Lipowiec Kościelny, within Mława County, Masovian Voivodeship, in north-central Poland.

== History ==
During the German occupation in World War II, the occupiers operated a forced labour camp for Poles in the village from April 1940 to December 1941. Some prisoners were murdered during escape attempts.
