= Parówki =

- Village
- Location within Poland
- Coordinates: 52°59′N 20°16′E
- Country: Poland
- Voivodeship: Masovian
- County: Mława
- Gmina: Strzegowo

Parówki [paˈrufki] is a village in the administrative district of Gmina Strzegowo, within Mława County, Masovian Voivodeship, in east-central Poland.
