= Gmina Szydłowo =

Gmina Szydłowo may refer to either of the following rural administrative districts in Poland:

- Gmina Szydłowo, Masovian Voivodeship
- Gmina Szydłowo, Greater Poland Voivodeship
