= Prusocin =

- Village
- Location within Poland
- Coordinates: 52°54′N 20°15′E
- Country: Poland
- Voivodeship: Masovian
- County: Mława
- Gmina: Strzegowo
- Population (2006): 90
- Post Code: 06-445 Strzegowo
- Number Zone: (+48) 23
- Vehicle registration: WML

Prusocin [pruˈsɔt͡ɕin] is a village in the administrative district of Gmina Strzegowo, within Mława County, Masovian Voivodeship, in east-central Poland.
