= Zabiele, Mława County =

Zabiele
- Village
- Location within Poland
- Coordinates: 52°51′57″N 20°19′26″E
- Country: Poland
- Voivodeship: Masovian
- County: Mława
- Gmina: Strzegowo

Zabiele [zaˈbjɛlɛ] is a village in the administrative district of Gmina Strzegowo, within Mława County, Masovian Voivodeship, in east-central Poland.
