= Kuskowo Kmiece =

- Village
- Location within Poland
- Coordinates: 52°52′43″N 20°18′22″E
- Country: Poland
- Voivodeship: Masovian
- County: Mława
- Gmina: Strzegowo
- Time zone: UTC+1 (CET)
  - Summer (DST): UTC+2 (CEST)

Kuskowo Kmiece [kusˈkɔvɔ ˈkmjɛt͡sɛ] is a village in the administrative district of Gmina Strzegowo, within Mława County, Masovian Voivodeship, in north-central Poland.

Five Polish citizens were murdered by Nazi Germany in Kuskowo Kmiece and Kuskowo-Bzury during World War II.
