= Giełczynek =

- Village
- Location within Poland
- Coordinates: 52°54′39″N 20°12′51″E
- Country: Poland
- Voivodeship: Masovian
- County: Mława
- Gmina: Strzegowo
- Population: 70

Giełczynek [ɡʲɛu̯ˈt͡ʂɨnɛk] is a village in the administrative district of Gmina Strzegowo, within Mława County, Masovian Voivodeship, in east-central Poland.
