= Zdroje, Masovian Voivodeship =

Zdroje
- Village
- Location within Poland
- Coordinates: 53°2′N 20°24′E
- Country: Poland
- Voivodeship: Masovian
- County: Mława
- Gmina: Stupsk

Zdroje [ˈzdrɔjɛ] is a village in the administrative district of Gmina Stupsk, within Mława County, Masovian Voivodeship, in east-central Poland.
