= Kozły-Janowo =

Village in Gmina Szydłowo, Poland

- Village
- Location within Poland
- Coordinates: 53°02′19″N 20°34′14″E
- Country: Poland
- Voivodeship: Masovian
- County: Mława
- Gmina: Szydłowo

Kozły-Janowo [ˈkɔzwɨ jaˈnɔvɔ] is a village in the administrative district of Gmina Szydłowo, within Mława County, Masovian Voivodeship, in east-central Poland.
