= Rumoka, Mława County =

Rumoka
- Village
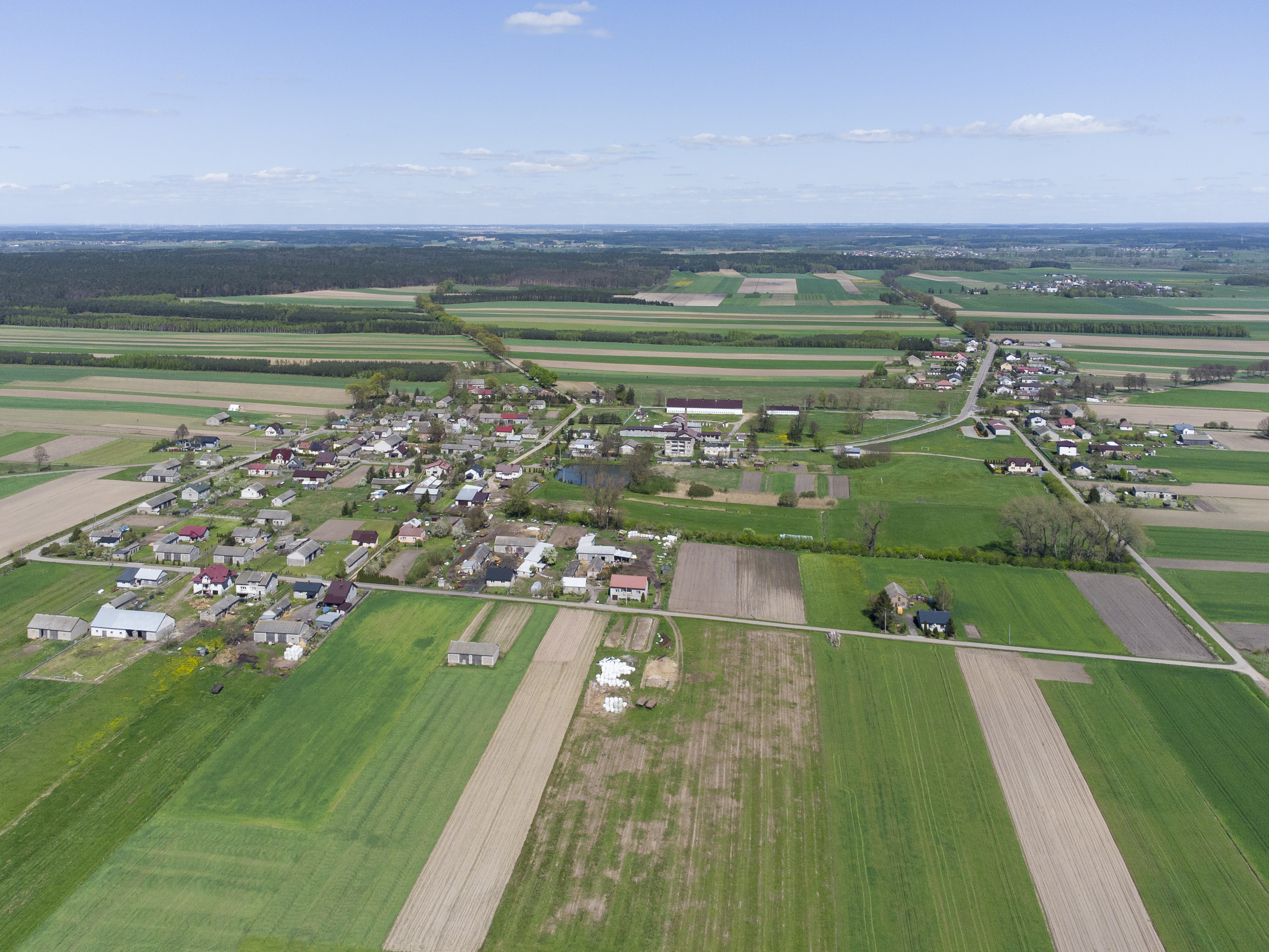
- Aerial view from the south

- Location within Poland
- Coordinates: 53°4′N 20°12′E
- Country: Poland
- Voivodeship: Masovian
- County: Mława
- Gmina: Lipowiec Kościelny

Rumoka [ruˈmɔka] is a village in the administrative district of Gmina Lipowiec Kościelny, within Mława County, Masovian Voivodeship, in east-central Poland.
