= Tyszki-Bregendy =

- Village
- Location within Poland
- Coordinates: 53°2′42″N 20°30′16″E
- Country: Poland
- Voivodeship: Masovian
- County: Mława
- Gmina: Szydłowo
- Population (approx.): 70

Tyszki-Bregendy [ˈtɨʂki brɛˈɡɛndɨ] is a village in the administrative district of Gmina Szydłowo, within Mława County, Masovian Voivodeship, in east-central Poland.
