= Nowiny Giżyńskie =

- Village
- Location within Poland
- Coordinates: 52°51′59″N 20°21′58″E
- Country: Poland
- Voivodeship: Masovian
- County: Mława
- Gmina: Strzegowo
- Population: 90

Nowiny Giżyńskie [nɔˈvinɨ ɡiˈʐɨɲskʲɛ] is a village in the administrative district of Gmina Strzegowo, within Mława County, Masovian Voivodeship, in east-central Poland.
