= Budy Polskie =

- Village
- Location within Poland
- Coordinates: 52°52′28″N 20°21′27″E
- Country: Poland
- Voivodeship: Masovian
- County: Mława
- Gmina: Strzegowo
- Population: 3

Budy Polskie [ˈbudɨ ˈpɔlskʲɛ] is a village in the administrative district of Gmina Strzegowo, within Mława County, Masovian Voivodeship, in east-central Poland.
