= Nowe Piegłowo =

Village in Gmina Szydłowo, Poland

- Village
- Location within Poland
- Coordinates: 53°03′30″N 20°32′19″E
- Country: Poland
- Voivodeship: Masovian
- County: Mława
- Gmina: Szydłowo

Nowe Piegłowo [ˈnɔvɛ pjɛˈɡwɔvɔ] is a village in the administrative district of Gmina Szydłowo, within Mława County, Masovian Voivodeship, in east-central Poland.
