= Olszewo-Tosie =

- Village
- Location within Poland
- Coordinates: 53°01′01″N 20°31′24″E
- Country: Poland
- Voivodeship: Masovian
- County: Mława
- Gmina: Stupsk

Olszewo-Tosie [ɔlˈʂɛvɔ ˈtɔɕɛ] is a village in the administrative district of Gmina Stupsk, within Mława County, Masovian Voivodeship, in east-central Poland.
