= Nowa Maryśka =

- Village
- Location within Poland
- Coordinates: 52°53′43″N 20°11′37″E
- Country: Poland
- Voivodeship: Masovian
- County: Mława
- Gmina: Strzegowo
- Population: 68

Nowa Maryśka [ˈnɔva maˈrɨɕka] is a village in the administrative district of Gmina Strzegowo, within Mława County, Masovian Voivodeship, in east-central Poland.
