= Szydłowo, Masovian Voivodeship =

Szydłowo
- Village
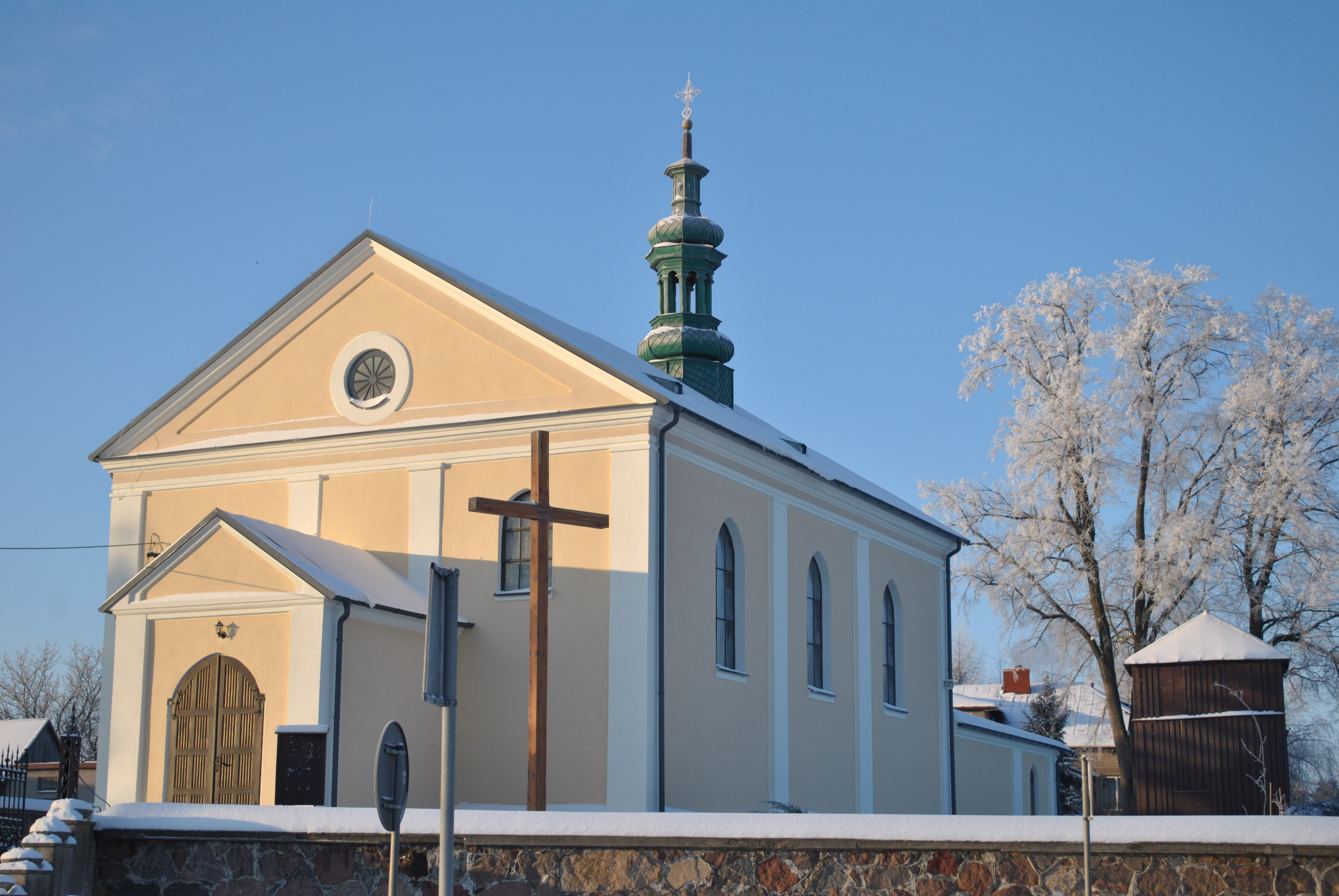
- Saint Mary Magdalene church in Szydłowo

- Location within Poland
- Coordinates: 53°5′N 20°27′E
- Country: Poland
- Voivodeship: Masovian
- County: Mława
- Gmina: Szydłowo
- Time zone: UTC+1 (CET)
  - Summer (DST): UTC+2 (CEST)
- Vehicle registration: WML

Szydłowo [ʂɨˈdwɔvɔ] is a village in Mława County, Masovian Voivodeship, in north-central Poland. It is the seat of the gmina (administrative district) called Gmina Szydłowo.
