= Gmina Strzegowo =

Gmina Strzegowo Strzegowo Commune
- Gmina
- Coat of arms
- Interactive map of Gmina Strzegowo
- Coordinates (Strzegowo): 52°54′N 20°17′E
- Country: Poland
- Voivodeship: Masovian
- County: Mława
- Seat: Strzegowo

Area
  - Total: 214.23 km^{2} (82.71 sq mi)

Population (2013)
  - Total: 7,802
  - Density: 36.42/km^{2} (94.32/sq mi)
- Website: http://www.strzegowo.pl

Gmina Strzegowo is a rural gmina (administrative district) in Mława County, Masovian Voivodeship, in east-central Poland. Its seat is the village of Strzegowo, which lies approximately 25 kilometres (16 mi) south-west of Mława and 89 km (55 mi) north-west of Warsaw.

The gmina covers an area of 214.23 square kilometres (82.7 sq mi), and as of 2006 its total population is 7,902 (7,802 in 2013).

== Villages ==
Gmina Strzegowo contains the villages and settlements of Adamowo, Aleksandrowo, Augustowo, Baranek, Breginie, Budy Budzkie, Budy Giżyńskie, Budy Kowalewkowskie, Budy Mdzewskie, Budy Polskie, Budy Strzegowskie, Budy Sułkowskie, Budy Wolińskie, Budy-Zofijki, Chądzyny-Krusze, Chądzyny-Kuski, Czarnocin, Czarnocinek, Dąbrowa, Dalnia, Drogiszka, Drogiszka-Tartak, Gatka, Giełczyn, Giełczynek, Giżyn, Giżynek, Huta Emilia, Ignacewo, Józefowo, Konotopa, Kontrewers, Kowalewko, Kozłowo, Kuskowo Kmiece, Kuskowo-Bzury, Kuskowo-Glinki, Łebki, Leszczyna, Mączewo, Marianowo, Marysinek, Mdzewko, Mdzewo, Niedzbórz, Nowa Maryśka, Nowiny Giżyńskie, Nowopole, Parówki, Pokrytki, Prusocin, Radzimowice, Rudowo, Rydzyn Szlachecki, Rydzyn Włościański, Smętne, Stara Maryśka, Staroguby, Strzegowo, Sujki, Sułkowo Borowe, Sułkowo Polne, Syberia, Szachowo, Szymańczyki, Topolewszczyzna, Tuchowo, Unierzyż, Unikowo, Wola Kanigowska, Zabiele and Zalesie.

== Neighbouring gminas ==
Gmina Strzegowo is bordered by the gminas of Ciechanów, Glinojeck, Raciąż, Radzanów, Regimin, Stupsk, Szreńsk and Wiśniewo.
