= Wiśniewo, Mława County =

Wiśniewo
- Village
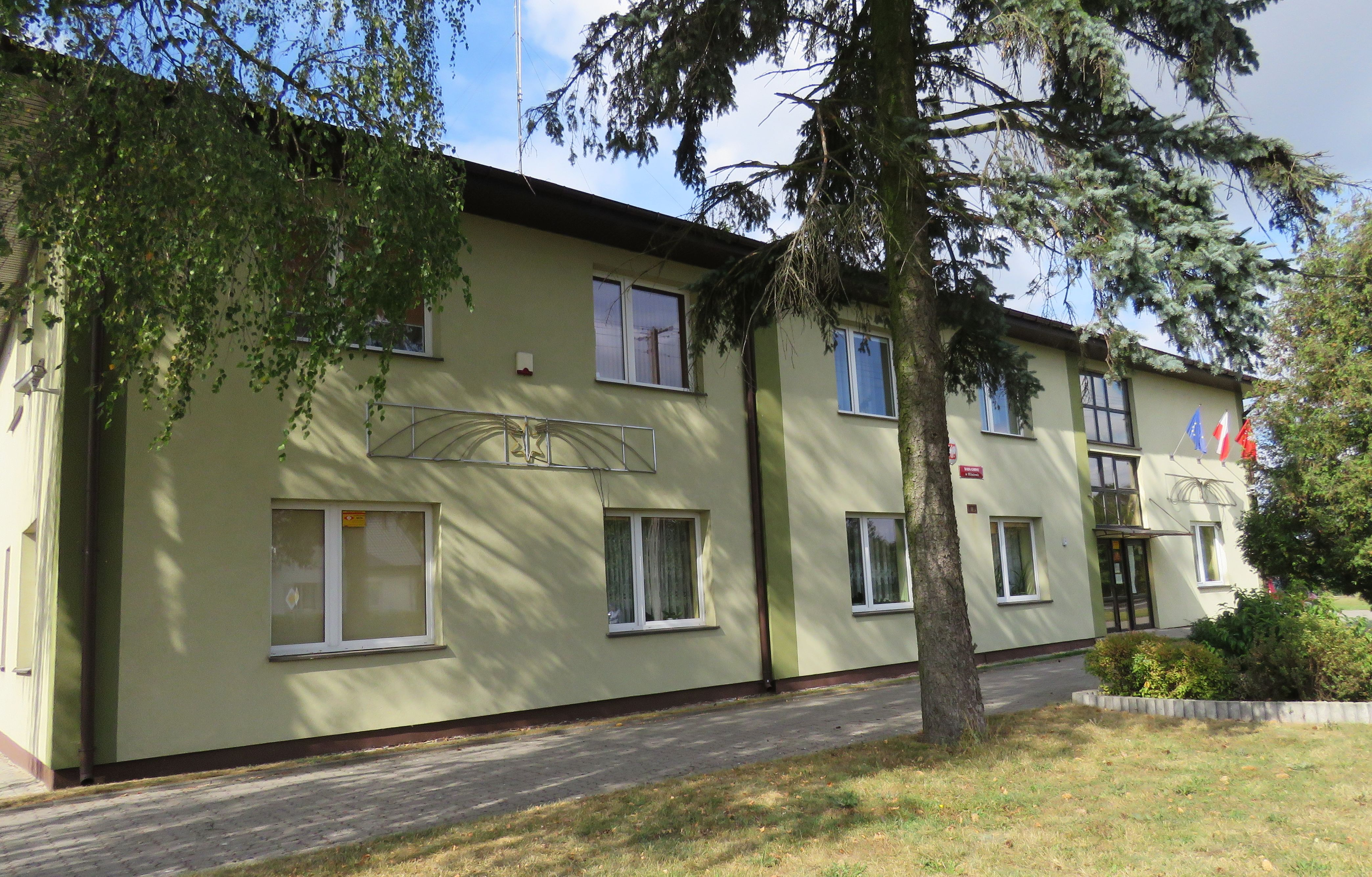
- Gmina Wiśniewo administration building

- Location within Poland
- Coordinates: 53°4′N 20°21′E
- Country: Poland
- Voivodeship: Masovian
- County: Mława
- Gmina: Wiśniewo

Wiśniewo [viɕˈɲɛvɔ] is a village in Mława County, Masovian Voivodeship, in east-central Poland. It is the seat of the gmina (administrative district) called Gmina Wiśniewo.
