= Strzałkowo, Masovian Voivodeship =

Strzałkowo
- Village
- Location within Poland
- Coordinates: 53°0′N 20°25′E
- Country: Poland
- Voivodeship: Masovian
- County: Mława
- Gmina: Stupsk
- Time zone: UTC+1 (CET)
  - Summer (DST): UTC+2 (CEST)
- Vehicle registration: WML

Strzałkowo [stʂau̯ˈkɔvɔ] is a village in the administrative district of Gmina Stupsk, within Mława County, Masovian Voivodeship, in north-central Poland.

Three Polish citizens were murdered by Nazi Germany in the village during World War II.
