= Giżyn, Masovian Voivodeship =

Giżyn
- Village
- Location within Poland
- Coordinates: 52°50′57″N 20°20′01″E
- Country: Poland
- Voivodeship: Masovian
- County: Mława
- Gmina: Strzegowo
- Time zone: UTC+1 (CET)
  - Summer (DST): UTC+2 (CEST)
- Vehicle registration: WML

Giżyn [ˈɡiʐɨn] is a village in the administrative district of Gmina Strzegowo, within Mława County, Masovian Voivodeship, in north-central Poland.

Two Polish citizens were murdered by Nazi Germany in the village during World War II.
