= Korzybie, Mława County =

Korzybie
- Village
- Location within Poland
- Coordinates: 53°01′45″N 20°32′50″E
- Country: Poland
- Voivodeship: Masovian
- County: Mława
- Gmina: Szydłowo

Korzybie [kɔˈʐɨbjɛ] is a village in the administrative district of Gmina Szydłowo, within Mława County, Masovian Voivodeship, in east-central Poland.
