= Józefowo, Gmina Lipowiec Kościelny =

Józefowo
- Village
- Location within Poland
- Coordinates: 53°9′N 20°12′E
- Country: Poland
- Voivodeship: Masovian
- County: Mława
- Gmina: Lipowiec Kościelny

Józefowo (Polish pronunciation: [juzɛˈfɔvɔ]) is a village in the administrative district of Gmina Lipowiec Kościelny, within Mława County, Masovian Voivodeship, in east-central Poland.
