= Turza Mała, Mława County =

Turza Mała
- Village
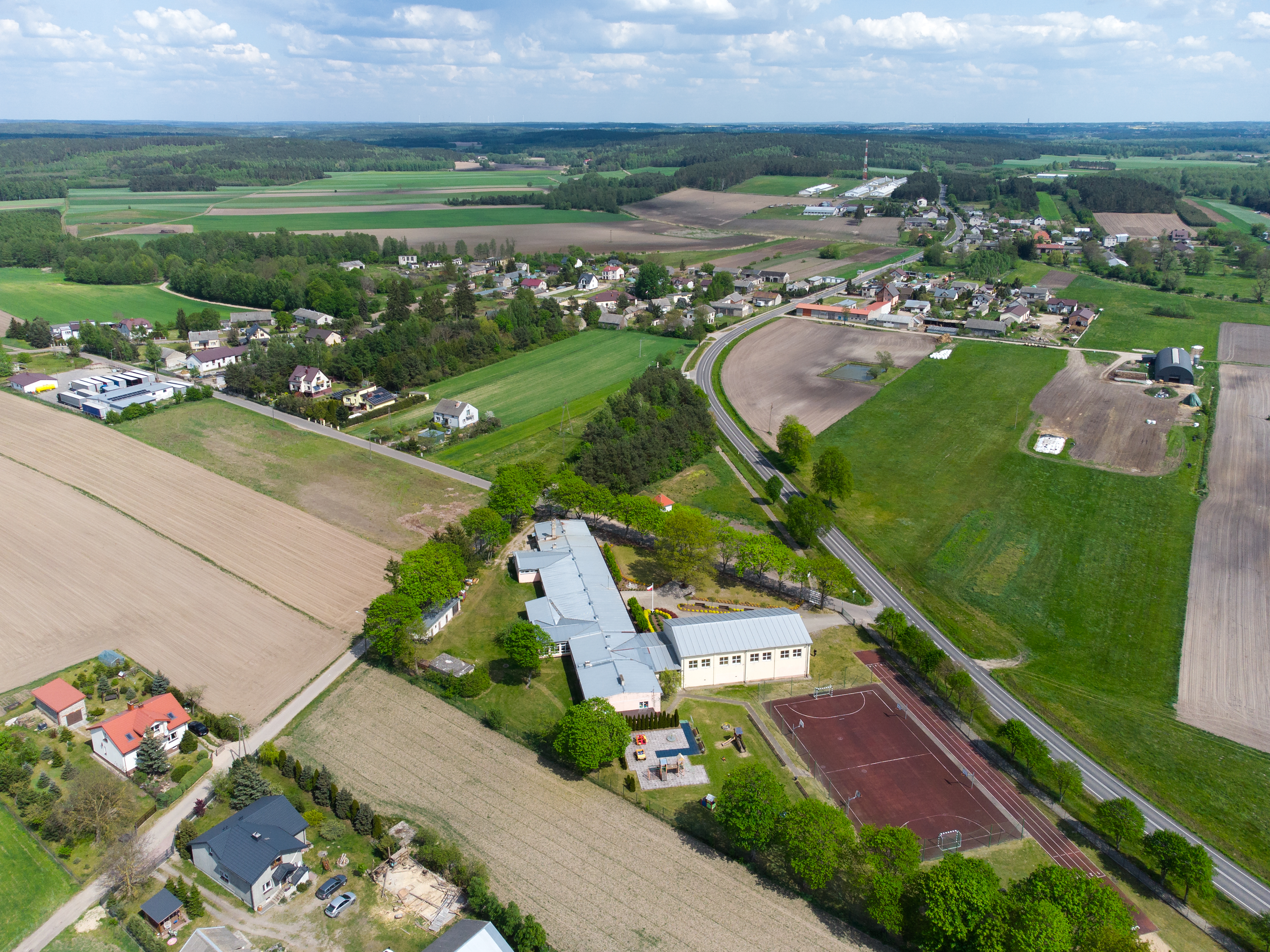
- View from the west.

- Location within Poland
- Coordinates: 53°7′N 20°15′E
- Country: Poland
- Voivodeship: Masovian
- County: Mława
- Gmina: Lipowiec Kościelny

Turza Mała [ˈtuʐa ˈmawa] is a village in the administrative district of Gmina Lipowiec Kościelny, within Mława County, Masovian Voivodeship, in east-central Poland.
