= Nieradowo, Mława County =

Nieradowo
- Village
- Location within Poland
- Coordinates: 53°6′17″N 20°28′37″E
- Country: Poland
- Voivodeship: Masovian
- County: Mława
- Gmina: Szydłowo
- Population: 50

Nieradowo [ɲɛraˈdɔvɔ] is a village in the administrative district of Gmina Szydłowo, within Mława County, Masovian Voivodeship, in east-central Poland.
