= Dunay (inhabited locality) =

Dunay (Russian: Дуна́й) is the name of several inhabited localities in Russia.

Urban localities

- Dunay, Primorsky Krai, an urban-type settlement under the administrative jurisdiction of Fokino City Under Krai Jurisdiction, Primorsky Krai

Rural localities

- Dunay, Leningrad Oblast, a logging depot settlement under the administrative jurisdiction of Morozovskoye Settlement Municipal Formation, Vsevolozhsky District, Leningrad Oblast
- Dunay, Tver Oblast, a village in Vyshnevolotsky District of Tver Oblast
- Dunay, Vologda Oblast, a village in Berezovsky Selsoviet of Nyuksensky District of Vologda Oblast
