= Turza Wielka, Mława County =

Turza Wielka
- Village
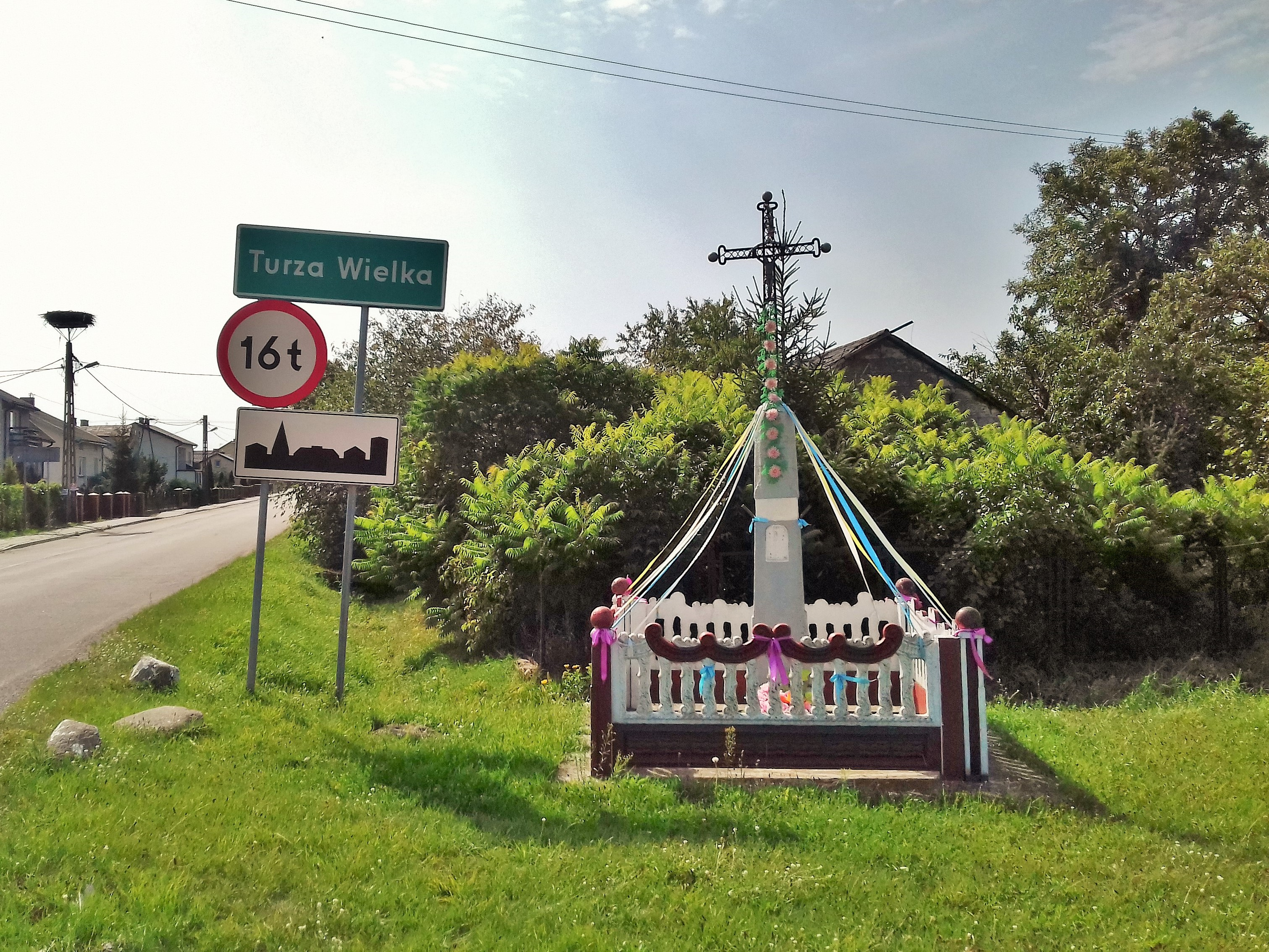

- Location within Poland
- Coordinates: 53°7′N 20°14′E
- Country: Poland
- Voivodeship: Masovian
- County: Mława
- Gmina: Lipowiec Kościelny

Turza Wielka [ˈtuʐa ˈvjɛlka] is a village in the administrative district of Gmina Lipowiec Kościelny, within Mława County, Masovian Voivodeship, in east-central Poland.
