= Józefowo, Gmina Strzegowo =

Józefowo
- Village
- Location within Poland
- Coordinates: 52°57′15″N 20°19′19″E
- Country: Poland
- Voivodeship: Masovian
- County: Mława
- Gmina: Strzegowo

Józefowo (Polish pronunciation: [juzɛˈfɔvɔ]) is a village in the administrative district of Gmina Strzegowo, within Mława County, Masovian Voivodeship, in east-central Poland.
