= Zalesie, Gmina Szydłowo =

Zalesie
- Village
- Location within Poland
- Coordinates: 53°06′13″N 20°32′56″E
- Country: Poland
- Voivodeship: Masovian
- County: Mława
- Gmina: Szydłowo
- Postal code: 06-516

Zalesie [zaˈlɛɕɛ] is a village in the administrative district of Gmina Szydłowo, within Mława County, Masovian Voivodeship, in north-central Poland.
