= Gmina Wiśniewo =

Gmina Wiśniewo Wiśniewo Commune
- Gmina
- Interactive map of Gmina Wiśniewo
- Coordinates (Wiśniewo): 53°4′N 20°21′E
- Country: Poland
- Voivodeship: Masovian
- County: Mława
- Seat: Wiśniewo

Area
  - Total: 99.31 km^{2} (38.34 sq mi)

Population (2013)
  - Total: 5,391
  - Density: 54.28/km^{2} (140.6/sq mi)

Gmina Wiśniewo is a rural gmina (administrative district) in Mława County, Masovian Voivodeship, in east-central Poland. Its seat is the village of Wiśniewo, which lies approximately 6 kilometres (3 mi) south-west of Mława and 103 km (64 mi) north-west of Warsaw.

The gmina covers an area of 99.31 square kilometres (38.3 sq mi), and as of 2006 its total population is 5,255 (5,391 in 2013).

== Villages ==
Gmina Wiśniewo contains the villages and settlements of Bogurzyn, Bogurzynek, Głużek, Korboniec, Kosiny Bartosowe, Kosiny Kapiczne, Kowalewo, Modła, Nowa Otocznia, Podkrajewo, Stara Otocznia, Stare Kosiny, Wiśniewko, Wiśniewo, Wojnówka and Żurominek.

== Neighbouring gminas ==
Gmina Wiśniewo is bordered by the town of Mława and by the gminas of Lipowiec Kościelny, Strzegowo, Stupsk, Szreńsk and Szydłowo.
