= Kluszewo =

- Village
- Location within Poland
- Coordinates: 53°3′N 20°33′E
- Country: Poland
- Voivodeship: Masovian
- County: Mława
- Gmina: Szydłowo
- Time zone: UTC+1 (CET)
  - Summer (DST): UTC+2 (CEST)
- Vehicle registration: WML

Kluszewo [kluˈʂɛvɔ] is a village in the administrative district of Gmina Szydłowo, within Mława County, Masovian Voivodeship, in north-central Poland.

Two Polish citizens were murdered by Nazi Germany in the village during World War II.
