= Strzegowo =

- Village
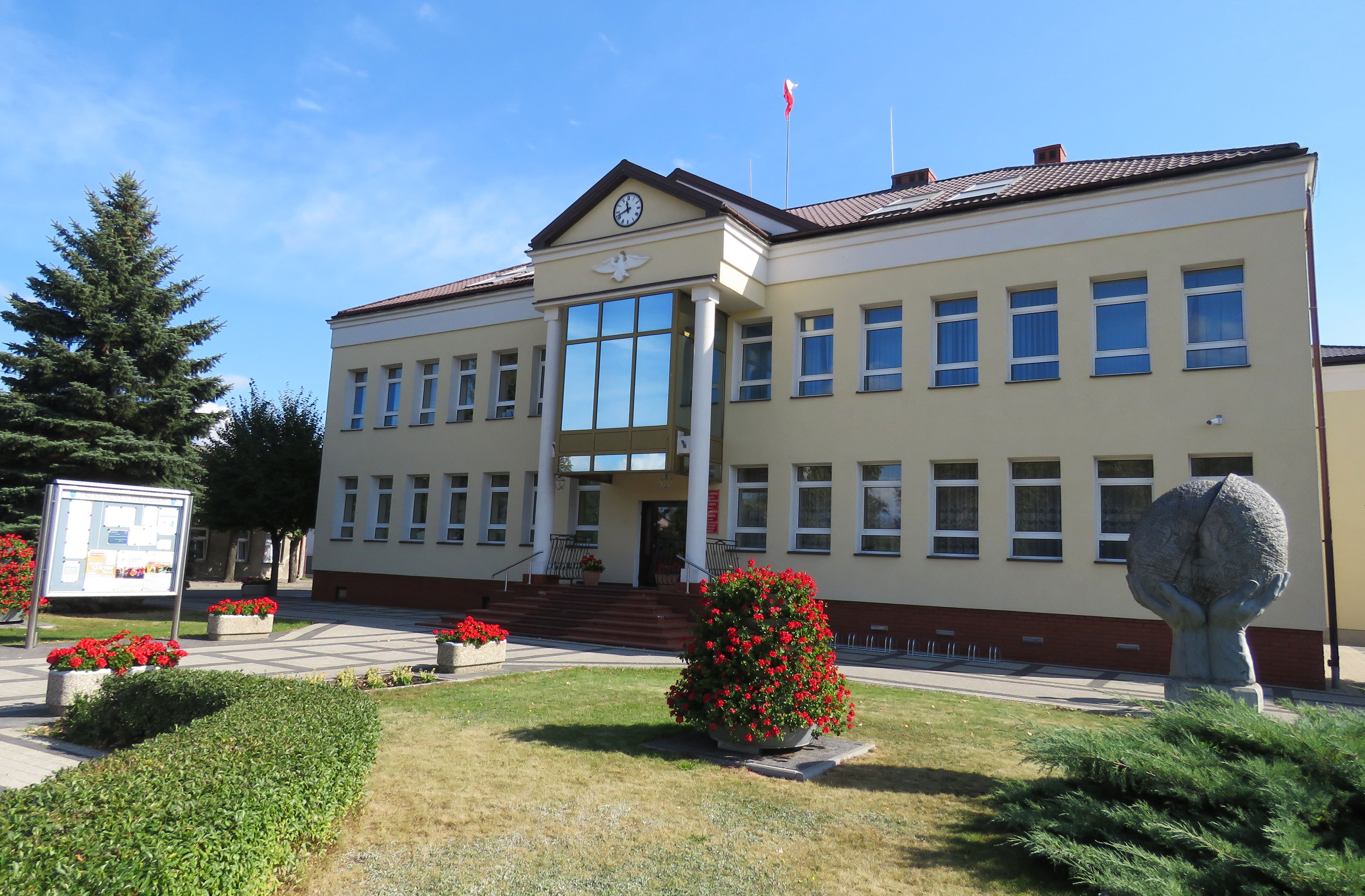
- Gmina office in Strzegowo

- Location within Poland
- Coordinates: 52°54′N 20°17′E
- Country: Poland
- Voivodeship: Masovian
- County: Mława
- Gmina: Strzegowo
- First mentioned: 1349
- Population: 8,000
- Time zone: UTC+1 (CET)
  - Summer (DST): UTC+2 (CEST)
- Vehicle registration: WML

Strzegowo [stʂɛˈɡɔvɔ] (Yiddish: סטשעגאווע, romanized: St'shegova) is a village on the Wkra river in Mława County, Masovian Voivodeship, in east-central Poland. It is the seat of the gmina (administrative district) called Gmina Strzegowo. It was formerly known as Strzegowo-Osada ("Strzegowo settlement").

== History ==
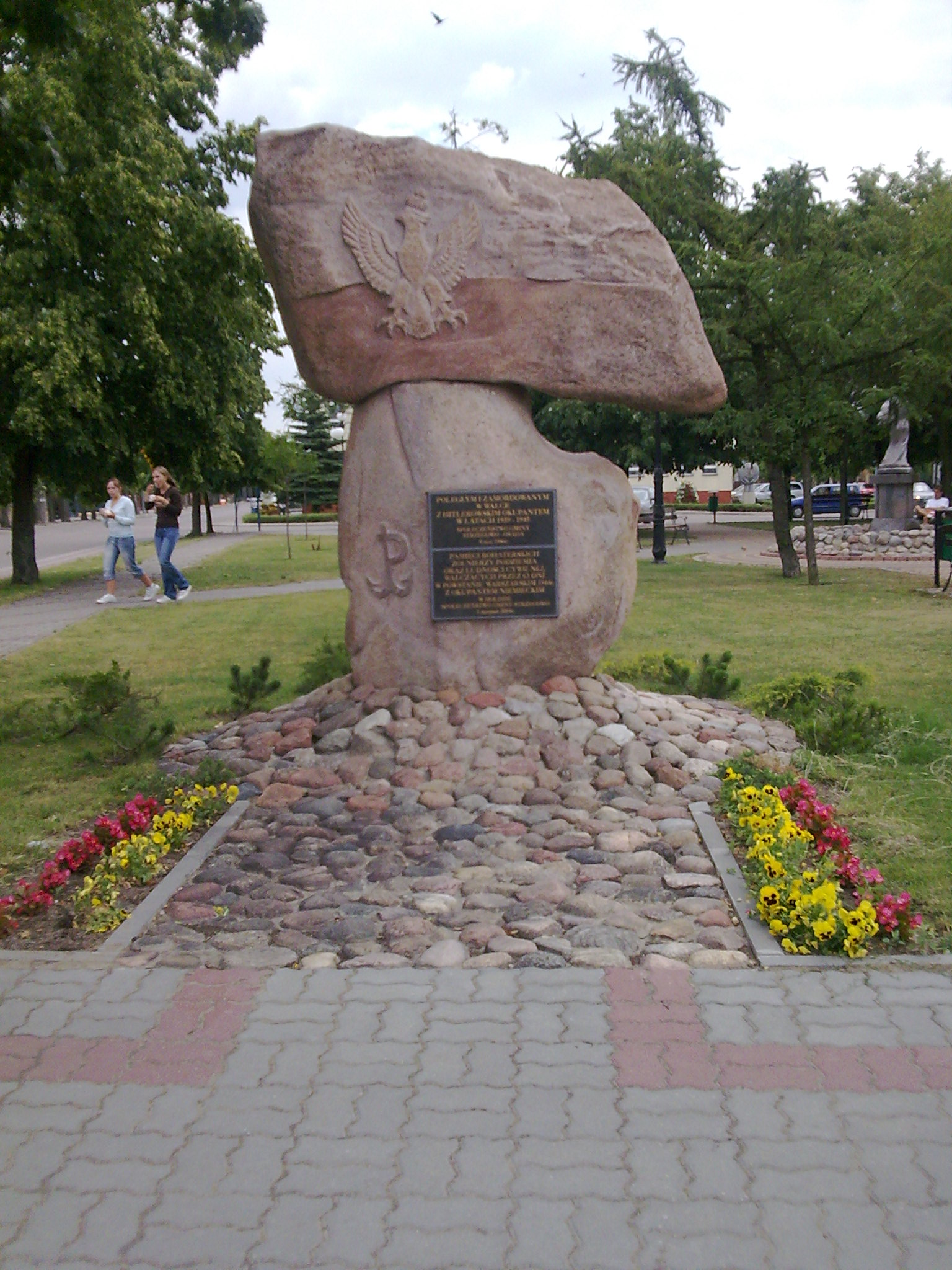
Monument to the fallen and murdered during the German occupation in World War II

The village was mentioned in medieval documents in 1349. Administratively it was located in the Płock Voivodeship in the Greater Poland Province of the Polish Crown. A Catholic parish was established in the village in 1532.

On August 21, 1920, it was a place of battle during the Polish–Soviet War. There is a military cemetery of the soldiers of the Polish 115th Greater Poland Uhlan Regiment, who died in the battle.

After the joint German-Soviet invasion of Poland, which started World War II, it was occupied by Germany from 1939 to 1945. Before the war, 30% of the population of the village was Jewish. Almost all were murdered in the Holocaust. Some were slaughtered in the town itself by Germans and local ethnic Germans (the Volksdeutsche). Others were deported to Treblinka and Auschwitz where they were murdered. A few escaped and joined the partisans. A Polish doctor staffed the small Jewish hospital and helped quell the epidemic of typhus. Nazi Germany also operated a transit camp for Poles expelled from the region at the local school.

The Jewish settlement was memorialised in a 1951 yizkor (later translated fully into English in 2000).
