= Lipowiec Kościelny =

- Village
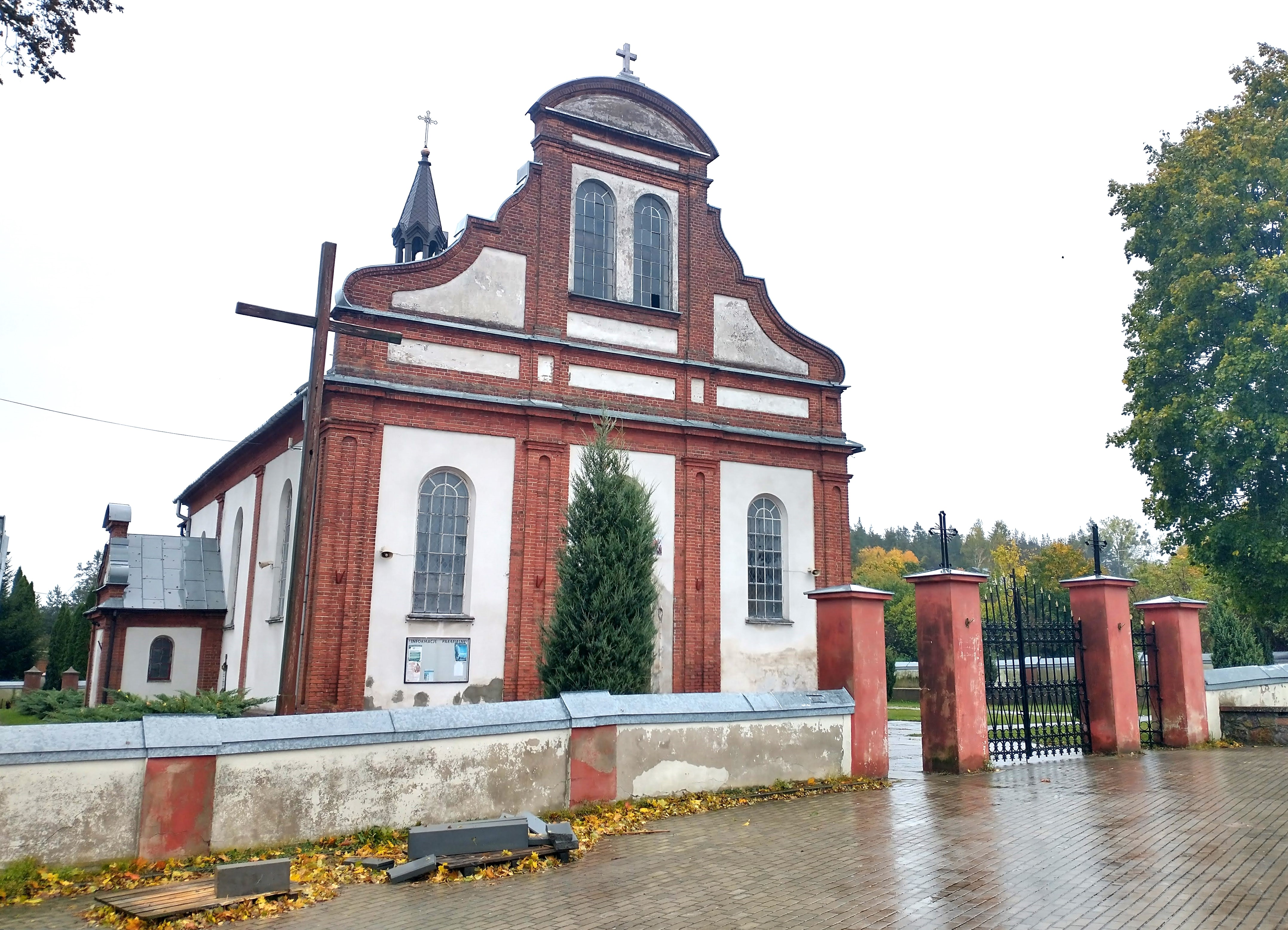
- Church of Saint Nicholas

- Location within Poland
- Coordinates: 53°6′N 20°11′E
- Country: Poland
- Voivodeship: Masovian
- County: Mława
- Gmina: Lipowiec Kościelny

Lipowiec Kościelny [liˈpɔvjɛt͡s kɔɕˈt͡ɕɛlnɨ] is a village in Mława County, Masovian Voivodeship, in east-central Poland. It is the seat of the gmina called Gmina Lipowiec Kościelny.
