= Gmina Lipowiec Kościelny =

Gmina Lipowiec Kościelny Lipowiec Kościelny Commune
- Gmina
- Interactive map of Gmina Lipowiec Kościelny
- Coordinates (Lipowiec Kościelny): 53°6′N 20°11′E
- Country: Poland
- Voivodeship: Masovian
- County: Mława
- Seat: Lipowiec Kościelny

Area
  - Total: 114.21 km^{2} (44.10 sq mi)

Population (2013)
  - Total: 4,928
  - Density: 43.15/km^{2} (111.8/sq mi)

Gmina Lipowiec Kościelny is a rural gmina (administrative district) in Mława County, Masovian Voivodeship, in east-central Poland. Its seat is the village of Lipowiec Kościelny, which lies approximately 14 kilometres (8 mi) west of Mława and 112 km (69 mi) north-west of Warsaw.

The gmina covers an area of 114.21 square kilometres (44.1 sq mi), and as of 2006 its total population is 5,125 (4,928 in 2013).

== Villages ==
Gmina Lipowiec Kościelny contains the villages and settlements of Borowe, Cegielnia Lewicka, Dobra Wola, Józefowo, Kęczewo, Krępa, Lewiczyn, Lipowiec Kościelny, Łomia, Niegocin, Parcele Łomskie, Rumoka, Turza Mała, Turza Wielka, Wola Kęczewska and Zawady.

== Neighbouring gminas ==
Gmina Lipowiec Kościelny is bordered by the town of Mława and by the gminas of Działdowo, Iłowo-Osada, Kuczbork-Osada, Szreńsk and Wiśniewo.
