= Stupsk =

- Village
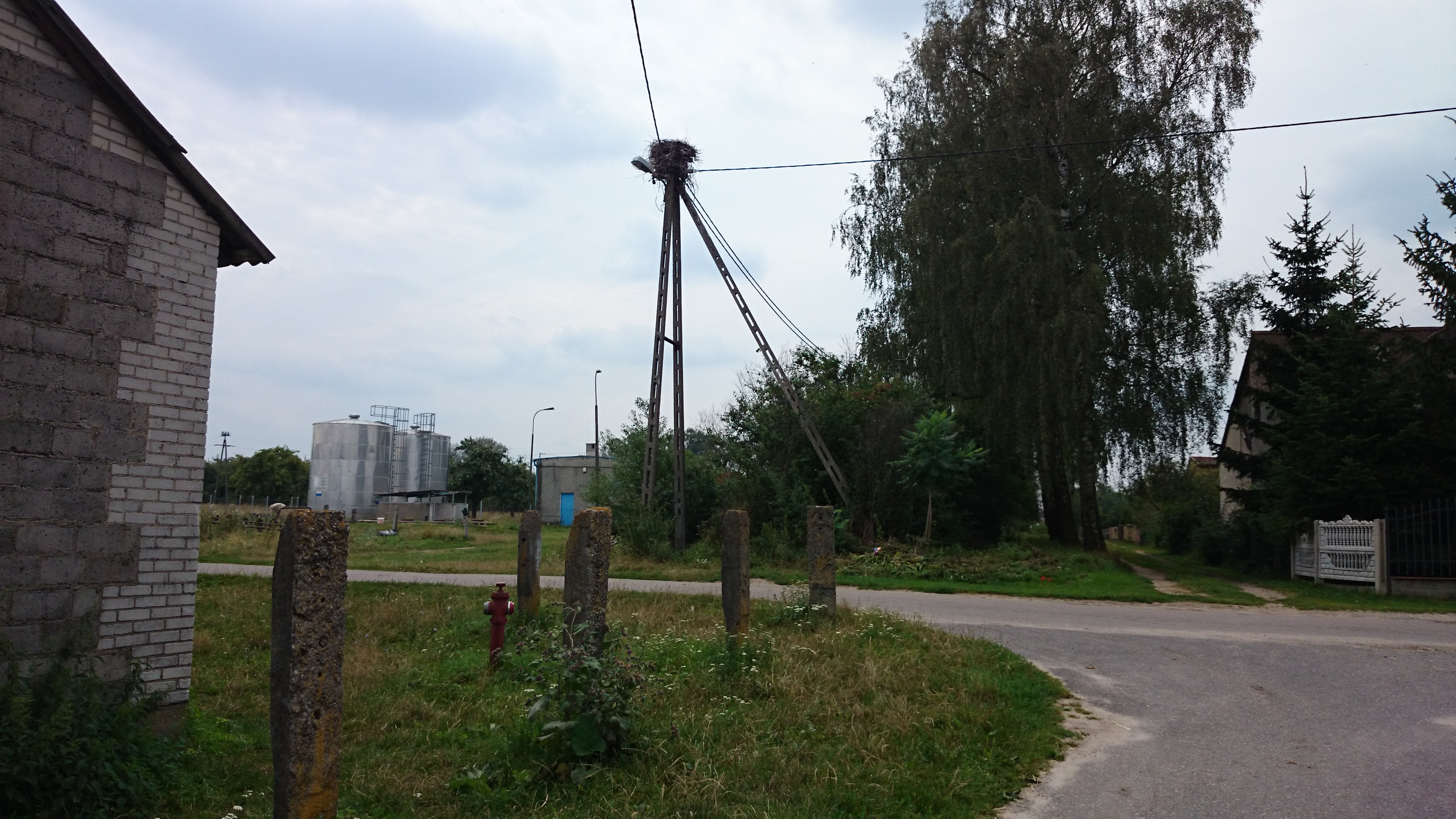

- Location within Poland
- Coordinates: 53°2′N 20°27′E
- Country: Poland
- Voivodeship: Masovian
- County: Mława
- Gmina: Stupsk
- Time zone: UTC+1 (CET)
  - Summer (DST): UTC+2 (CEST)

Stupsk [stupsk] is a village in Mława County, Masovian Voivodeship, in north-central Poland. It is the seat of the gmina (administrative district) called Gmina Stupsk.

Five Polish citizens were murdered by Nazi Germany in the village during World War II.
