= Morawy, Masovian Voivodeship =

Morawy
- Village
- Location within Poland
- Coordinates: 53°0′N 20°26′E
- Country: Poland
- Voivodeship: Masovian
- County: Mława
- Gmina: Stupsk

Morawy [mɔˈravɨ] is a village in the administrative district of Gmina Stupsk, within Mława County, Masovian Voivodeship, in east-central Poland.
