= Radzimowice, Masovian Voivodeship =

Radzimowice
- Village

- Location within Poland
- Coordinates: 52°55′19″N 20°12′18″E
- Country: Poland
- Voivodeship: Masovian
- County: Mława
- Gmina: Strzegowo

Population
  - Total: 90
- Time zone: UTC+1 (CET)
  - Summer (DST): UTC+2 (CEST)
- Vehicle registration: WML

Radzimowice [rad͡ʑimɔˈvit͡sɛ] is a village in the administrative district of Gmina Strzegowo, within Mława County, Masovian Voivodeship, in north-central Poland.

Four Polish citizens were murdered by Nazi Germany in the village during World War II.
