= Gmina Stupsk =

Gmina Stupsk Stupsk Commune
- Gmina
- Interactive map of Gmina Stupsk
- Coordinates (Stupsk): 53°2′N 20°27′E
- Country: Poland
- Voivodeship: Masovian
- County: Mława
- Seat: Stupsk

Area
  - Total: 118.04 km^{2} (45.58 sq mi)

Population (2013)
  - Total: 4,996
  - Density: 42.32/km^{2} (109.6/sq mi)
- Website: http://www.gminy.pl/stupsk

Gmina Stupsk is a rural gmina (administrative district) in Mława County, Masovian Voivodeship, in east-central Poland. Its seat is the village of Stupsk, which lies approximately 11 kilometres (7 mi) south-east of Mława and 98 km (61 mi) north of Warsaw.

The gmina covers an area of 118.04 square kilometres (45.6 sq mi), and as of 2006 its total population is 5,037 (4,996 in 2013).

== Villages ==
Gmina Stupsk contains the villages and settlements of Bolewo, Budy Bolewskie, Dąbek, Dunaj, Feliksowo, Jeże, Konopki, Krośnice, Morawy, Olszewo-Bołąki, Olszewo-Borzymy, Olszewo-Chlebowo, Olszewo-Grzymki, Olszewo-Marcisze, Olszewo-Reszki, Olszewo-Tosie, Pieńpole, Rosochy, Stefankowo, Strzałkowo, Stupsk, Sułkowo-Baraki, Sułkowo-Kolonia, Wola Szydłowska, Wola-Kolonia, Wyszyny Kościelne, Zdroje, Żmijewo Kościelne, Żmijewo-Gaje, Żmijewo-Kuce, Żmijewo-Podusie, Żmijewo-Ponki, Żmijewo-Szawły and Żmijewo-Trojany.

== Neighbouring gminas ==
Gmina Stupsk is bordered by the gminas of Grudusk, Regimin, Strzegowo, Szydłowo and Wiśniewo.
