= Osipovo, Chagodoshchensky District, Vologda Oblast =

Osipovo Осипово
- Village
- Location within Vologda Oblast Location within Russia
- Coordinates: 59°11′N 35°40′E
- Country: Russia
- Region: Vologda Oblast
- District: Chagodoshchensky District
- Time zone: UTC+3:00

Osipovo (Russian: Осипово) is a rural locality (a village) in Megrinskoye Rural Settlement, Chagodoshchensky District, Vologda Oblast, Russia. The population was 1 as of 2002.

== Geography ==
Osipovo is located km northeast of Chagoda (the district's administrative centre) by road. Niz is the nearest rural locality.
