= Dunay, Vologda Oblast =

Dunay Дунай
- Village
- Location within Vologda Oblast Location within Russia
- Coordinates: 60°24′N 44°17′E
- Country: Russia
- Region: Vologda Oblast
- District: Nyuksensky District
- Time zone: UTC+3:00

Dunay (Russian: Дунай) is a rural locality (a village) in Nyuksenskoye Rural Settlement, Nyuksensky District, Vologda Oblast, Russia. The population was 61 as of 2002. There are 4 streets.

== Geography ==
Dunay is located 18 km east of Nyuksenitsa (the district's administrative centre) by road. Oleshkovka is the nearest rural locality.
