= Gmina Szydłowo, Masovian Voivodeship =

Gmina Szydłowo Szydłowo Commune
- Gmina
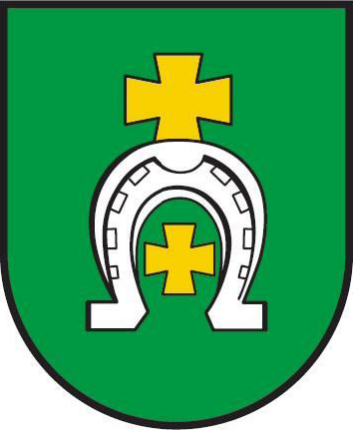
- Coat of arms
- Interactive map of Gmina Szydłowo
- Coordinates (Szydłowo): 53°5′N 20°27′E
- Country: Poland
- Voivodeship: Masovian
- County: Mława
- Seat: Szydłowo

Area
  - Total: 122.21 km^{2} (47.19 sq mi)

Population (2013)
  - Total: 4,653
  - Density: 38.07/km^{2} (98.61/sq mi)
- Website: http://www.szydlowo-maz.bazagmin.pl

Gmina Szydłowo is a rural gmina (administrative district) in Mława County, Masovian Voivodeship, in east-central Poland. Its seat is the village of Szydłowo, which lies approximately 6 kilometres (3 mi) south-east of Mława and 102 km (63 mi) north-west of Warsaw.

The gmina covers an area of 122.21 square kilometres (47.2 sq mi), and as of 2006 its total population is 4,559 (4,653 in 2013).

== Villages ==
Gmina Szydłowo contains the villages and settlements of Budy Garlińskie, Dębsk, Garlino, Giednia, Kluszewo, Korzybie, Kozły-Janowo, Krzywonoś, Marianowo, Młodynin, Nieradowo, Nosarzewo Borowe, Nosarzewo Polne, Nowa Sławogóra, Nowa Wieś, Nowe Nosarzewo, Nowe Piegłowo, Pawłowo, Piegłowo-Kolonia, Piegłowo-Wieś, Stara Sławogóra, Stare Niemyje, Szydłówek, Szydłowo, Trzcianka, Trzcianka-Kolonia, Tyszki-Bregendy, Wola Dębska and Zalesie.

== Neighbouring gminas ==
Gmina Szydłowo is bordered by the town of Mława and by the gminas of Dzierzgowo, Grudusk, Stupsk, Wieczfnia Kościelna and Wiśniewo.
