= Osipovo, Vladimir Oblast =

Osipovo Осипово
- Selo
- Location within Vladimir Oblast Location within Russia
- Coordinates: 56°22′N 41°28′E
- Country: Russia
- Region: Vladimir Oblast
- District: Kovrovsky District
- Time zone: UTC+3:00

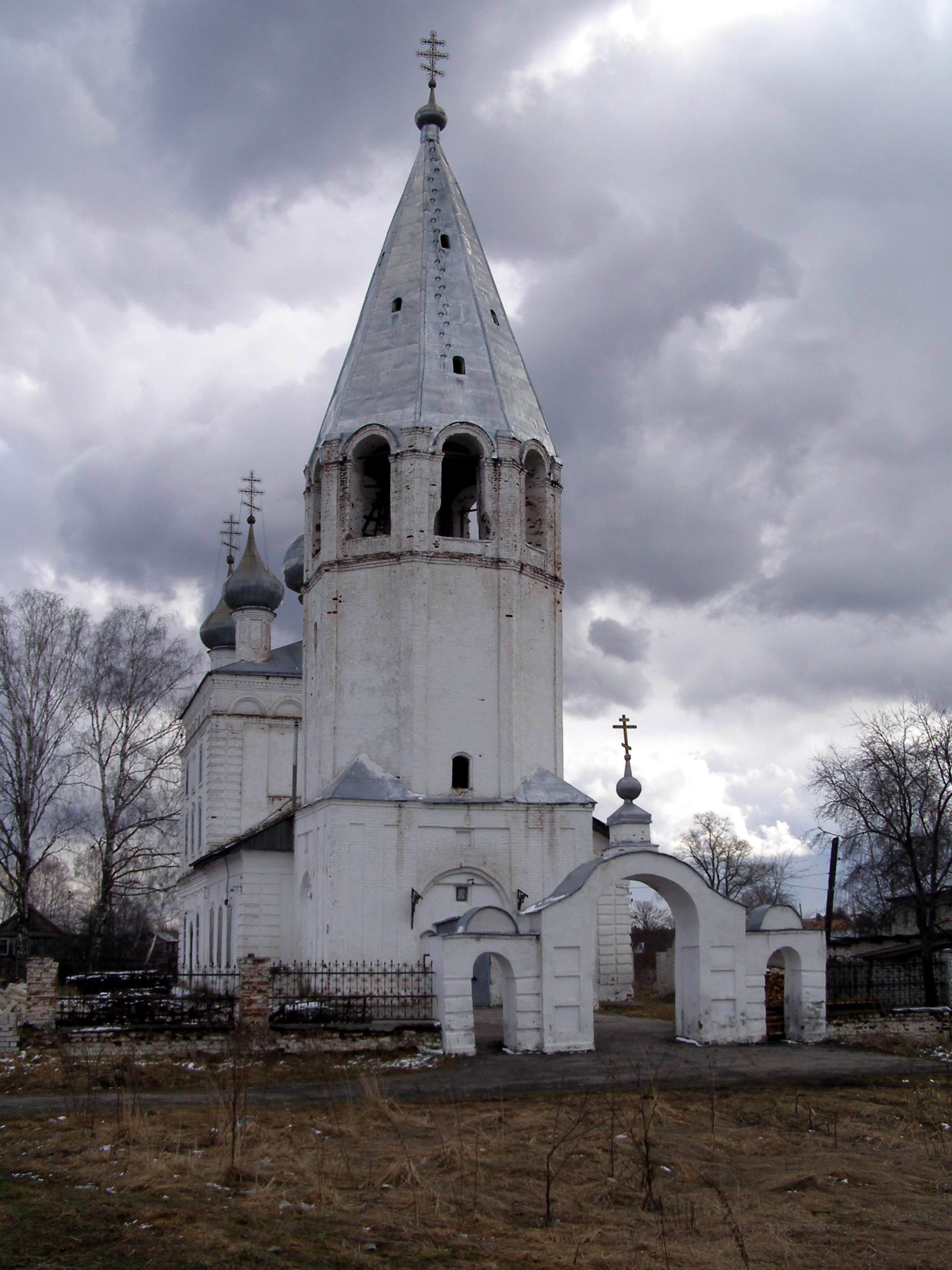

Osipovo (Russian: Осипово) is a rural locality (a selo) in Klyazminskoye Rural Settlement, Kovrovsky District, Vladimir Oblast, Russia. The population was 176 as of 2010.

== Geography ==
Osipovo is located 13 km east of Kovrov (the district's administrative centre) by road. Kanabyevo is the nearest rural locality.
