= Dunaj, Moravče =

Dunaj
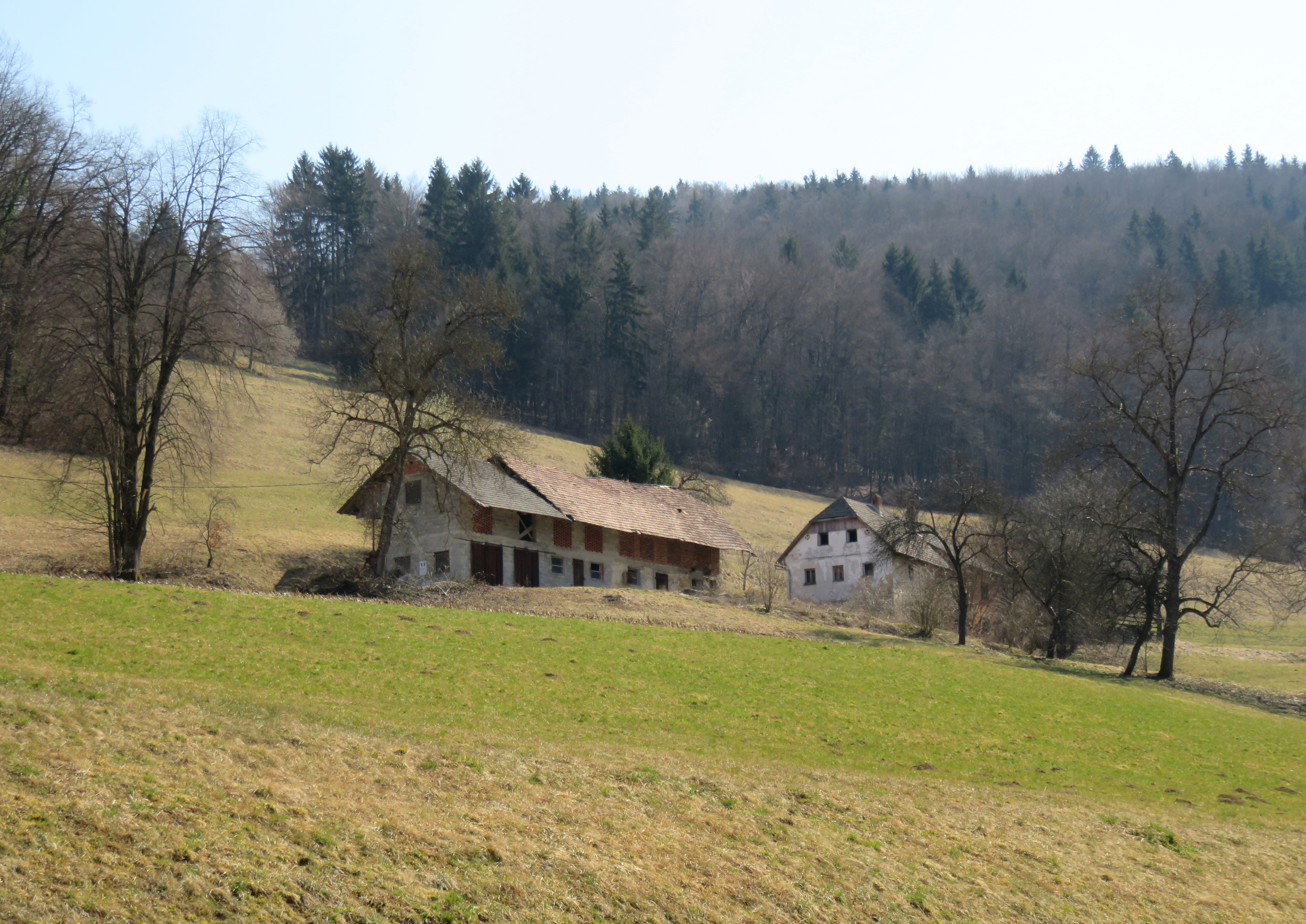

- Location in Slovenia
- Coordinates: 46°7′20″N 14°44′03″E
- Country: Slovenia
- Traditional region: Upper Carniola
- Statistical region: Central Slovenia
- Municipality: Moravče
- Elevation: 385 m (1,263 ft)

Dunaj (Slovene pronunciation: [ˈduːnai̯], in older sources Dunej) is a former settlement in the Municipality of Moravče in central Slovenia. It is now part of the village of Češnjice pri Moravčah. The area is part of the traditional region of Upper Carniola. The municipality is now included in the Central Slovenia Statistical Region.

== Geography ==
Dunaj lies in the western part of Češnjice pri Moravčah, southwest of the main settlement.

== History ==
Dunaj had a population of seven living in two houses in 1900. Dunaj was annexed by Češnjice pri Moravčah in 1952, ending its existence as an independent settlement.
