= Osipovo, Sokolsky District, Vologda Oblast =

Osipovo Осипово
- Village
- Location within Vologda Oblast Location within Russia
- Coordinates: 59°38′N 40°33′E
- Country: Russia
- Region: Vologda Oblast
- District: Sokolsky District
- Time zone: UTC+3:00

Osipovo (Russian: Осипово) is a rural locality (a village) in Dvinitskoye Rural Settlement, Sokolsky District, Vologda Oblast, Russia. The population was 14 as of 2002.

== Geography ==
The distance to Sokol is 39 km, to Chekshino is 1 km.
