= Mława County =

Mława County Powiat mławski
- County
- Flag Coat of arms

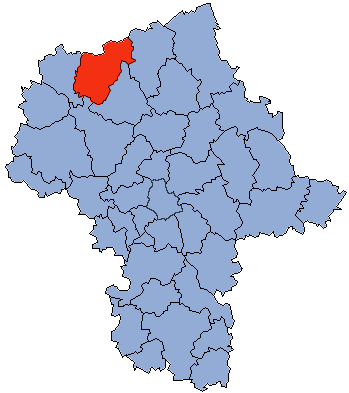
- Location within the voivodeship

- Division into gminas
- Coordinates (Mława): 53°7′N 20°22′E
- Country: Poland
- Voivodeship: Masovian
- Seat: Mława
- Gminas: Total 10 (incl. 1 urban): Mława; Gmina Dzierzgowo; Gmina Lipowiec Kościelny; Gmina Radzanów; Gmina Strzegowo; Gmina Stupsk; Gmina Szreńsk; Gmina Szydłowo; Gmina Wieczfnia Kościelna; Gmina Wiśniewo

Area
  - Total: 1,182.3 km^{2} (456.5 sq mi)

Population (2019)
  - Total: 72,906
  - Density: 61.665/km^{2} (159.71/sq mi)
  - Urban: 31,241
  - Rural: 41,665
- Car plates: WML
- Website: www.powiatmlawski.pl

Mława County (Polish: powiat mławski) is a unit of territorial administration and local government (powiat) in Masovian Voivodeship, east-central Poland. It came into being on 1 January 1999, as a result of the Polish local government reforms passed in 1998. Its administrative seat and only town is Mława, which lies 109 kilometres (68 mi) north-west of Warsaw.

The county covers an area of 1,182.3 square kilometres (456.5 sq mi). As of 2019, its total population is 72,906, out of which the population of Mława is 31,241, and the rural population is 41,665.

== Neighbouring counties ==
Mława County is bordered by Nidzica County to the north, Przasnysz County to the east, Ciechanów County and Płońsk County to the south, Żuromin County to the west, and Działdowo County to the north-west.

== Administrative divisions ==
The county is subdivided into 10 gminas (one urban and nine rural). These are listed in the following table, in descending order of population.

Gmina	Type	Area (km^{2})	Population (2019)	Seat
Mława	urban	35.5	31,241	
Gmina Strzegowo	rural	214.2	7,546	Strzegowo
Gmina Wiśniewo	rural	99.3	5,263	Wiśniewo
Gmina Stupsk	rural	118.0	4,830	Stupsk
Gmina Lipowiec Kościelny	rural	114.2	4,811	Lipowiec Kościelny
Gmina Szydłowo	rural	122.2	4,586	Szydłowo
Gmina Szreńsk	rural	109.7	4,172	Szreńsk
Gmina Wieczfnia Kościelna	rural	119.8	4,067	Wieczfnia Kościelna
Gmina Radzanów	rural	98.7	3,318	Radzanów
Gmina Dzierzgowo	rural	150.6	3,072	Dzierzgowo
