= Koscielny =

Koscielny or Kościelny (masculine, [kɔɕˈt͡ɕɛlnɨ]), Kościelna (feminine, [kɔɕˈt͡ɕɛlna]), and Kościelne (neuter or plural, [kɔɕˈt͡ɕɛlnɛ]) are Polish adjectives derived from the word kościół ("church"). They are widely used in Polish place names and may also appear as a surname, e.g. Laurent Koscielny, a French footballer of Polish ancestry.

== Places using Kościelny ==
=== Administrative districts ===
- Gmina Bargłów Kościelny, a district in Podlaskie Voivodeship
- Gmina Janowiec Kościelny, a district in Warmian-Masurian Voivodeship
- Gmina Juchnowiec Kościelny, a district in Podlaskie Voivodeship
- Gmina Lipowiec Kościelny, a district in Masovian Voivodeship
- Gmina Miastków Kościelny, a district in Masovian Voivodeship
- Gmina Szczawin Kościelny, a district in Masovian Voivodeship

=== Villages ===
- Bargłów Kościelny, a village in Podlaskie Voivodeship
- Budzisław Kościelny, a village in Greater Poland Voivodeship
- Cienin Kościelny, a village in Greater Poland Voivodeship
- Czyżew Kościelny, a village in Podlaskie Voivodeship
- Janowiec Kościelny, a village in Warmian-Masurian Voivodeship
- Juchnowiec Kościelny, a village in Podlaskie Voivodeship
- Kundzin Kościelny, a village in Podlaskie Voivodeship
- Łęg Kościelny, a village in Masovian Voivodeship
- Łubin Kościelny, a village in Podlaskie Voivodeship
- Szczawin Kościelny, Łódź Voivodeship, a village in central Poland
- Szczawin Kościelny, Masovian Voivodeship, a village in central Poland
- Zawidz Kościelny, a village in Masovian Voivodeship
- Zemborzyn Kościelny, a village in Świętokrzyskie Voivodeship

== Places using Kościelna ==
=== Administrative districts ===
- Gmina Turośń Kościelna, a district in Podlaskie Voivodeship
- Gmina Wieczfnia Kościelna, a district in Masovian Voivodeship

=== Villages ===
- Boruja Kościelna, a village in Greater Poland Voivodeship
- Czarna Wieś Kościelna, a village in Podlaskie Voivodeship
- Dąbrówka Kościelna, Greater Poland Voivodeship, a village in west-central Poland
- Dąbrówka Kościelna, Podlaskie Voivodeship, a village in north-eastern Poland
- Długa Kościelna, a village in Masovian Voivodeship
- Jabłoń Kościelna, a village in Podlaskie Voivodeship
- Jabłonka Kościelna, a village in Podlaskie Voivodeship
- Kalinówka Kościelna, a village in Podlaskie Voivodeship
- Kościelna Góra, a village in Masovian Voivodeship
- Kościelna Jania, a village in Pomeranian Voivodeship
- Kościelna Wieś (disambiguation), several villages
- Krępa Kościelna, a village in Masovian Voivodeship
- Księżomierz Kościelna, a village in Lublin Voivodeship
- Niedrzwica Kościelna, a village in Lublin Voivodeship
- Niedrzwica Kościelna-Kolonia, a village in Lublin Voivodeship
- Niewodnica Kościelna, a village in Podlaskie Voivodeship
- Płonka Kościelna, a village in Podlaskie Voivodeship
- Ruda Kościelna, a village in Świętokrzyskie Voivodeship
- Tłokinia Kościelna, a village in Greater Poland Voivodeship
- Turośń Kościelna, a village in Podlaskie Voivodeship
- Wiązowna Kościelna, a village in Masovian Voivodeship
- Wieczfnia Kościelna, a village in Masovian Voivodeship

== Places using Kościelne ==
=== Administrative districts ===
- Gmina Kołaki Kościelne
- Gmina Kulesze Kościelne
- Gmina Skarżysko Kościelne
- Gmina Zaręby Kościelne

=== Villages ===
- Bądkowo Kościelne
- Bońkowo Kościelne
- Borkowo Kościelne
- Borysławice Kościelne
- Chwałkowo Kościelne
- Dobrzyniewo Kościelne
- Dworszowice Kościelne
- Dworszowice Kościelne-Kolonia
- Górecko Kościelne
- Gradzanowo Kościelne
- Izdebno Kościelne
- Jezierzyce Kościelne
- Kaszewy Kościelne
- Kołaki Kościelne
- Kuchary Kościelne
- Kulesze Kościelne
- Łagiewniki Kościelne
- Łęki Kościelne
- Lisewo Kościelne
- Majewo Kościelne
- Malice Kościelne
- Murzynowo Kościelne
- Ostrowo Kościelne
- Pawłowo Kościelne
- Palędzie Kościelne
- Podlesie Kościelne
- Popowo Kościelne, Greater Poland Voivodeship
- Rosochate Kościelne
- Skarżysko Kościelne
- Strzyżewo Kościelne
- Świdry Kościelne
- Wojkowice Kościelne
- Wyszonki Kościelne
- Wyszyny Kościelne
- Zakrzewo Kościelne
- Załuskie Kościelne
- Zambski Kościelne
- Zaręby Kościelne
- Żmijewo Kościelne
