= Golas =

Golas may refer to:

== People ==
- Arkadiusz Gołaś (1981 – 2005), Polish volleyball player
- Andrzej Maria Gołaś (born 1946), Polish politician
- Michał Gołaś (born 1984), Polish professional road bicycle racer
- Thaddeus Golas (1924 – 1997), American author
- Victor Golas (born 1990), Brazilian footballer
- Wiesław Gołas (born 1930), Polish actor

== Geography ==
- Golaš, a mountain of Serbia
- Gołas, a village in east-central Poland

== See also ==
- Gołaś (disambiguation)
