= Kunki =

Kunki may refer to

== Places ==
- Kunki, Lublin Voivodeship (east Poland)
- Kunki, Gostynin County in Masovian Voivodeship (east-central Poland)
- Kunki, Mława County in Masovian Voivodeship (east-central Poland)
- Kunki, Warmian-Masurian Voivodeship (north Poland)
- Kunki, Republic of Dagestan (Russia)

== See also ==
- Koonki, a trained elephant used to capture wild ones in Assam
