= Gołaś =

Gołaś may refer to:

- Arkadiusz Gołaś (1981 – 2005), Polish volleyball player
- Andrzej Maria Gołaś (born 1946), Polish politician
- Michał Gołaś (born 1984), Polish professional road bicycle racer
- Michał Gołaś (skier) (born 2004), Polish para-alpine skier

== See also ==
- Golas (disambiguation)
- Wiesław Gołas (born 1930), a Polish actor
- Gołas, a village in east-central Poland.
- Golaš, a mountain of Serbia.
