= Reszki =

Reszki may refer to the following places:

- Reszki, Masovian Voivodeship (east-central Poland)
- Reszki, Podlaskie Voivodeship (north-east Poland)
- Reszki, Pomeranian Voivodeship (north Poland)
- Reszki, Warmian-Masurian Voivodeship (north Poland)
