= Bolesława Lament =

Polish religious sister and Blessed

Blessed Bolesława Maria Lament
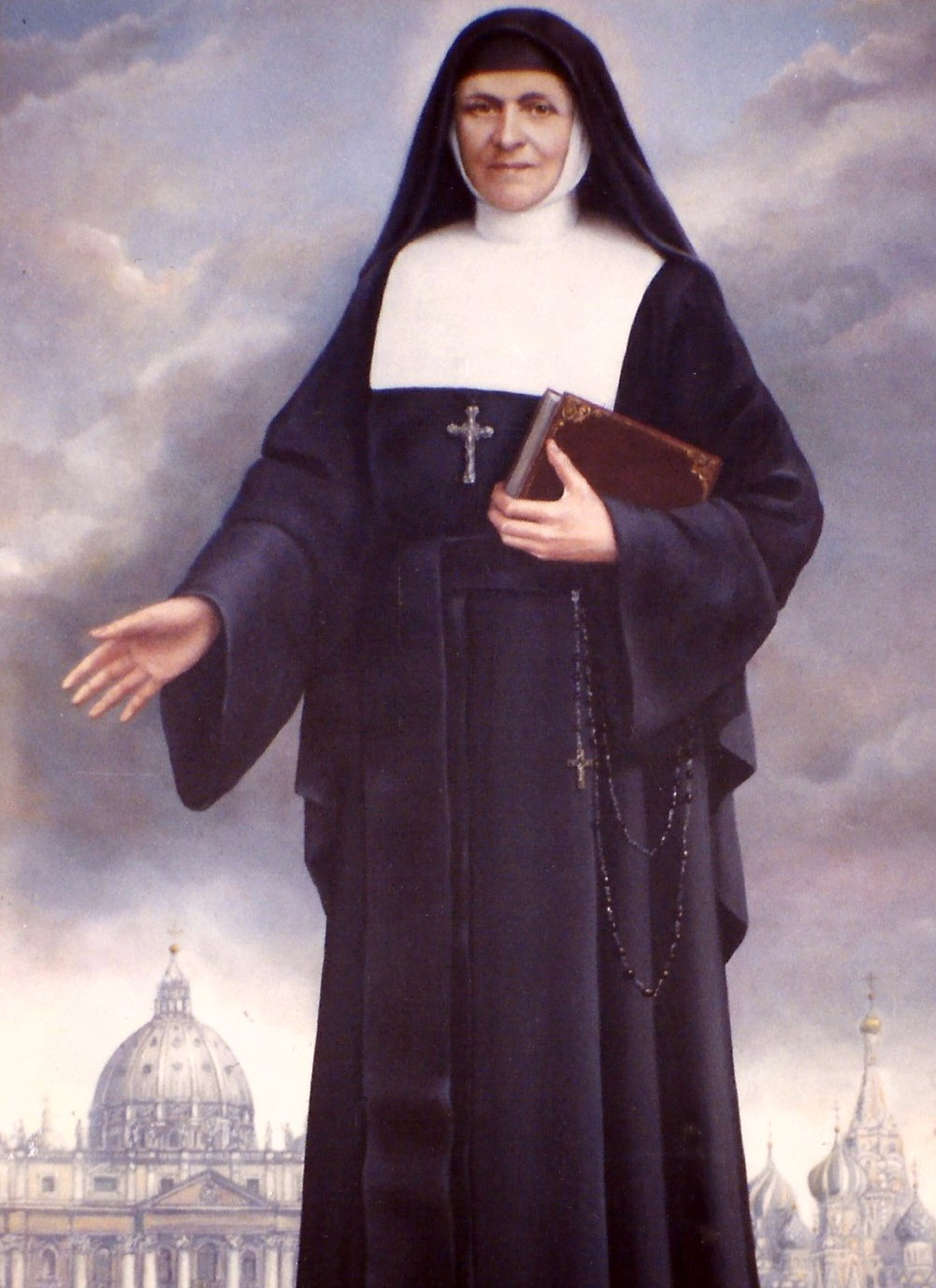
- Beatification image by Zbigniew Kotyłło
- Born: 3 July 1862; Łowicz, Warsaw Governorate, Congress Poland
- Died: 29 January 1946 (aged 83); Białystok, Polish People's Republic
- Venerated in: Roman Catholic Church
- Beatified: 5 June 1991, Białystok, Poland by Pope John Paul II
- Feast: 29 January

Bolesława Maria Lament (3 July 1862 – 29 January 1946) was a Polish religious sister and the founder of the Missionary Sisters of the Holy Family. Lament worked as a seamstress and soon joined a religious congregation though left just prior to her profession upon experiencing vocational doubts; she returned to her life as a seamstress and worked with two of her sisters to support their siblings and widowed mother. The death of her seminarian brother prompted her to return to the religious life – Honorat Koźmiński encouraged this return – and she later founded a congregation that soon spread and took her to Russia though its revolution forced her departure during World War I. Pope John Paul II beatified Lament while in Poland in 1991.

== Life ==
Bolesława Maria Lament was born in 1862 as the eldest of eight children to Martin Lament and Lucia Cyganowska in Poland. Three of her siblings died in their childhood which left profound scars on Lament caused profound grief for her. Two sisters were Maria and Stanislava and one brother was Stefano (c. 1881–1900). Lament was demanding in her childhood and often forced her will upon her siblings.

She was schooled in an atmosphere of constant negation of Christian faith and she was often discriminated against due to her strong faith; she graduated with honors. Lament trained in the capital of Warsaw as a seamstress and returned to her hometown so as to open a tailor's shop with her sister Stanislava. In 1884 she decided to enter the religious life and so joined the Congregation of the Family of Mary and served as both a tailor and teacher in several of the congregation's houses across Poland in places like Odessa. In 1893 – prior to her vows – she questioned her vocation and left the congregation to return home.

Back home she devoted herself to the care of the homeless and then moved to Warsaw – for about a decade – where she and her sister Maria opened another tailor's store to support both themselves and their siblings. It was here that she met Honorat Koźmiński who became her spiritual director and urged her to rethink her call and implement it in her life. Lament soon became the director of a homeless shelter and often aided the homeless and their children. Her father died in a cholera epidemic in 1894 and she had to assume charge for her siblings and mother on a financial level. The 1900 death of her seminarian brother revived her desire to be part of the religious life and she vowed in front of his casket to return to the religious life. Lament moved to another town soon after to learn weaving as another skill she could pass on to others before addressing her vocation. She became a member of the Third Order of Saint Francis around this time.

In October 1905 she rallied other women and the Jesuit Felice Wiercinski and founded a religious congregation that spread across Poland at a rapid pace. In 1907 she and others moved to expand the congregation in Russia at Saint Petersburg. Lament was forced to leave Russia with the outbreak of the Russian Revolution and departed in 1921. From 1925 until 1935 she remained at the convent at Ratowo and then resigned as the Superior General of the congregation in 1935 due to her declining health; she became paralyzed in 1941 and spent most of the remainder of her life bedridden.

Lament died in 1946 and her remains were interred under the church of Saint Anthony at the Ratowo convent. The congregation received diocesan approval on 24 June 1924 and then papal approval from Pope Paul VI on 7 July 1967; in 2005 there was 338 religious in 44 houses in places such as Zambia, Lithuania and Russia.

== Beatification ==
The beatification process opened on 5 April 1975 under Pope Paul VI and she was titled as a Servant of God while the diocesan process was conducted in Vilnius from 22 October 1976 until 8 November 1979; the Congregation for the Causes of Saints validated this process on 25 November 1983 and received the Positio from the postulation in 1989. Theologians approved the Positio on 5 October 1990 as did the Congregation for the Causes of Saints on 4 December 1990; Pope John Paul II confirmed her heroic virtue and named her as venerable.

The beatification miracle was investigated in the place it originated in and the Congregation for the Causes of Saints validated it on 8 May 1987 before a medical board approved it sometime later on 21 March 1991; theologians approved it on 19 April 1991 as did the Congregation on 10 May 1991. John Paul II confirmed the miracle as being due to her intercession on 14 May 1991 and beatified Lament while on his apostolic visit to Poland on 5 June 1991. The postulator assigned to this cause is Joanna Mieczysława Babińska.
