= Marysinek =

Marysinek may refer to the following places:

- Marysinek, Gmina Radzanów in Masovian Voivodeship (east-central Poland)
- Marysinek, Gmina Strzegowo in Masovian Voivodeship (east-central Poland)
- Marysinek, Sochaczew County in Masovian Voivodeship (east-central Poland)
- Marysinek, Warsaw West County in Masovian Voivodeship (east-central Poland)
