= Borkowizna =

Borkowizna refers to the following places in Poland:

- Borkowizna, Gmina Niedrzwica Duża
- Borkowizna, Gmina Strzyżewice
