= Gmina Radzanów =

Gmina Radzanów may refer to either of the following rural administrative districts in Masovian Voivodeship, Poland:

- Gmina Radzanów, Białobrzegi County
- Gmina Radzanów, Mława County
