= Modrzew =

Modrzew may refer to the following places:

- Modrzew, Łódź Voivodeship (central Poland)
- Modrzew, Gostynin County in Masovian Voivodeship (east-central Poland)
- Modrzew, Siedlce County in Masovian Voivodeship (east-central Poland)
