= Two-Gun Cohen =

Polish-born British-Canadian adventurer

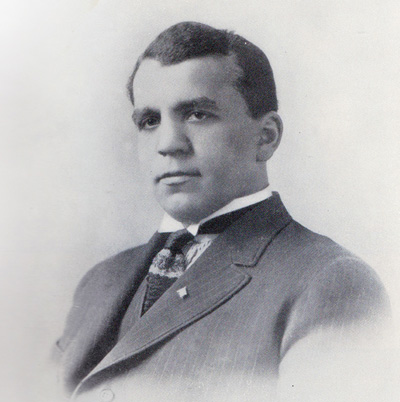
- Cohen in 1913
- Born: Moszek Abram Miączyn; 3 August 1887; Radzanów, Congress Poland
- Died: 7 September 1970 (aged 83); Salford, Greater Manchester, England
- Other name: Morris Abraham Cohen
- Occupations: Adventurer, aide-de-camp, major-general
- Spouse: Ida Judith Clark (div. 1956)

Morris Abraham Cohen (born Moszek Abram Miączyn; 3 August 1887 – 7 September 1970), better known as Two-Gun Cohen, was a Polish-born British and Canadian adventurer of Jewish origin who became aide-de-camp to Sun Yat-sen and a major-general in the Chinese National Revolutionary Army.

== Early years ==
Cohen was born into an Orthodox Jewish family in Radzanów, Congress Poland, on 3 August 1887. His father was Josef Leib Mialczyn, a wheelwright, and his mother was Sheindel Lipshitz. In 1889 the family emigrated to England and settled in East London, where Josef worked in a textile factory. They changed their family name to the easier-to-pronounce Cohen, and Abraham went by Morris and Moishe.

Cohen loved the theaters, the streets, the markets, the foods and the boxing arenas of the British capital more than he did the Jews' Free School. Cohen was arrested on 30 April 1900 as "a person suspected of attempting to pick pockets". A magistrate sent him to the Hayes Industrial School, an institution set up by the likes of Lord Rothschild to care for and train wayward Jewish lads. He was released in 1905 and Cohen's parents shipped the young Morris off to western Canada with the hope that the fresh air and open plains of the New World would reform his ways.

Cohen initially worked on a farm near Whitewood, Saskatchewan. He tilled the land, tended the livestock and learned to shoot a gun and play cards. He did that for a year, and then started wandering through the Western provinces, making a living as a carnival barker, gambler, card sharp, pickpocket, pimp, and successful real estate broker. Some of his activities landed him in jail, and in particular he was jailed in Winnipeg for sexual relations with a girl who was under the age of sixteen.

Cohen also became friendly with some of the Chinese exiles who had come to work on the Canadian Pacific Railways. He loved the camaraderie and the food, and in Saskatoon came to the aid of a Chinese restaurant owner who was being robbed. Cohen's training in the alleyways of London came in handy, and he knocked out the thief and tossed him out into the street.

Such an act was unheard of. Few white men ever came to the aid of a Chinese man in early 20th century Canada. As a Jew, though, Cohen felt an affinity for the Chinese underdog. He knew what it was like to be an outsider, someone who society shunned. — Daniel S. Levy, author of Two-Gun Cohen: A Biography.

The Chinese welcomed Cohen into their fold and eventually invited him to join the Tongmenghui, Sun Yat-sen's anti-Manchu organization. Cohen began to advocate for Chinese expatriates and learned the teachings of Sun Yat-sen. Morris Cohen soon moved to the city of Edmonton in the neighbouring province of Alberta. There he became manager of one of the provincial capital's leading real estate agencies and was appointed, on the personal recommendation of the Attorney General Sir Charles Wilson Cross, to serve the province as a Commissioner of Oaths, an appointment offered only to "fit and proper persons". He used his position to assist Chinese immigrants in becoming naturalised.

It was in pre-World War I Edmonton that Cohen commenced his long and varied military career by recruiting members of the Chinese community and training them in drill and musketry on behalf of Dr Sun Yat-sen's representative organization in Canada.

== Military career ==
The real estate market in Edmonton experienced a decline with the advent of World War I. Without any income, Cohen joined the 218th Battalion, CEF. He became a sergeant and moved to Camp Sarcee in Calgary for training. He became known by local newspapers for his regular clashes with the law. On one occasion in October 1916, he was among thirteen soldiers who were charged with disturbing the peace after an altercation with the Calgary City Police. He was acquitted after serving as his own defense, and the Calgary Herald noted his "surprising knowledge of court procedures."

Cohen fought with the Canadian Railway Troops in Europe during World War I where part of his job involved supervising the Chinese Labour Corps. He also saw some fierce fighting at the Western Front, especially during the Third Battle of Ypres. After the war, he resettled in Canada. But the economy had declined and the days of the real estate boom were long over. Cohen looked for something new to do, and in 1922 he headed to China to help close a railway deal for Sun Yat-sen with Northern Construction and JW Stewart Ltd. After disembarking in Shanghai, Cohen went to see George Sokolsky, the New-York born journalist who worked for Sun's English-language Shanghai Gazette. Sokolsky arranged an interview for him with Eugene Chen, Sun's English language secretary. Cohen was hired, and soon ensconced himself at Sun’s home at 29 Rue Molière in the city’s French Concession. He then got right to work.

In Shanghai and Canton (Guangzhou), Cohen trained Sun's small armed forces to box and shoot, and told people that he was an aide-de-camp and an acting colonel in Sun Yat-sen's army. Fortunately for Cohen, his lack of proficiency in Chinese – he spoke a pidgin form of Cantonese at best – was not a problem since Sun, his wife Soong Ching-ling and many of their associates were Western-educated and spoke English. Cohen's colleagues started calling him Ma Kun (馬坤), and he soon became one of Sun's main protectors, shadowing the Chinese leader to conferences and war zones.

After one battle where he was nicked by a bullet, Cohen wondered what he would do if one of his arms were injured. He started carrying a second revolver, and found he was ambidextrous. The western community were intrigued by Sun's gun-toting protector and began calling him "Two-Gun Cohen."

Sun died of cancer in 1925, and Cohen went to work for a series of Southern Chinese Kuomintang leaders, from Sun's son, Sun Fo, and Sun's brother-in-law, the banker T. V. Soong, to such warlords as Li Jishen and Chen Jitang. He was also acquainted with Chiang Kai-shek, whom he knew from when Chiang was commandant of the Whampoa Military Academy, which was located outside of Canton. His dealings with Chiang, though, were minimal since Cohen was allied with southern leaders who were generally opposed to Chiang. Cohen ran security for his bosses and acquired weapons and gunboats. Eventually he earned the rank of acting general, though he never led any troops.

Cohen spent time in Hong Kong, including at the Hong Kong Jewish Club where he played poker and performed magic tricks. When the Japanese invaded China in 1937, Cohen eagerly joined the fight. He rounded up weapons for the Chinese and even did work for the British intelligence agency, Special Operations Executive (SOE). Cohen was able to prove that the Japanese were using poison gas to exterminate the Chinese masses. Cohen was in Hong Kong when the Japanese attacked in December 1941. He placed Soong Ching-ling and her sister Ai-ling on one of the last planes out of the British colony.

Cohen stayed behind to fight, and when Hong Kong fell later that month, the Japanese imprisoned him at Stanley Internment Camp. There the Japanese badly beat him and he languished in Stanley until he was part of a rare prisoner exchange in late 1943. In December 1943, he arrived in Montreal.

== Later life ==
Cohen sailed back to Canada, settled in Montreal and married Ida Judith Clark, who ran a women's boutique. He made regular visits back to China with the hope of establishing work or business ties. Mostly, Cohen saw old friends, sat in hotel lobbies and spun out tales—many of them tall—of his exploits. It was his own myth making, together with the desire of others to fabricate yarns about him, that has resulted in much of the misinformation about Cohen, from the claim that he had a hand in the making of modern China, to such outlandish ones like him having an affair with Soong Ching-ling and a wife in Canada back in the 1920s.

According to Daniel S. Levy, in 1947 Cohen went to San Francisco and used a 1920 letter from Sun Yat-sen supporting Zionism to persuade General Wu Tieh-cheng, head of the Chinese delegation, to abstain when the United Nations General Assembly adopted United Nations General Assembly Resolution 181, instead of voting against.

After the 1949 Communist takeover, Cohen was one of the few people who was able to move between Taiwan and mainland China. His prolonged absences took a toll on his marriage, and he and Judith divorced in 1956.

Cohen then settled with his widowed sister, Leah Cooper, in Salford, England. There he was surrounded by siblings, nephews and nieces and became a beloved family patriarch. His standing as a loyal aide to Sun Yat-sen helped him maintain good relations with both Kuomintang and Chinese Communist leaders, and he soon was able to arrange consulting jobs with Vickers (planes), Rolls-Royce (engines) and Decca Radar.

His last visit to China was during the start of the Cultural Revolution as an honoured guest of Zhou Enlai, in 1966. Cohen died on 7 September 1970 in Salford. He is buried in Blackley Jewish Cemetery in Manchester. His tombstone bears inscriptions in English, Hebrew and Chinese; the Chinese inscription was composed by Soong Ching-ling. Having achieved good relations with both the Communist and Nationalist factions in China, a rare simultaneous public appearance of representatives from both factions occurred at Cohen's funeral.

== Bibliography ==
There are numerous publications that focus on the life of Morris Cohen:

- Charles Drage with Morris Cohen, Two-Gun Cohen (1954)
- Paolo Frere, The Pedlar and the Doctor (1995)
- Daniel S. Levy Two-Gun Cohen: A Biography (1997)
- Jim Christy, Scalawags (2008)

== Film ==
- In Frank Capra's The Bitter Tea of General Yen (1933), the character of "Jones," a western adviser to the general, may resemble Cohen. The movie was based on a book of the same name by Grace Zaring Stone, who lived in Canton in the 1920s. In an interview with Stone's daughter in the early 1990s, she said that she was not sure if her mother and Cohen's paths crossed. But since the western community in that city was relatively insular, she said that it was quite likely that Stone at least knew of Cohen.
- The General Died at Dawn (1936) was inspired by Cohen, with Gary Cooper playing the part of an Irish-American adventurer in China.
- The Gunrunner (1983), a Canadian movie with Kevin Costner, was inspired by Cohen.

== See also ==
- List of riots and civil unrest in Calgary
