= Bargłówka =

Bargłówka refers to the following places in Poland:

- Bargłówka, Podlaskie Voivodeship
- Bargłówka, Silesian Voivodeship
