= Krzymów =

Krzymów may refer to the following places:

- Krzymów, Greater Poland Voivodeship (west-central Poland)
- Krzymów, Masovian Voivodeship (east-central Poland)
- Krzymów, West Pomeranian Voivodeship (north-west Poland)
