= Bojanowo (disambiguation) =

Bojanowo may refer to the following places:

- Bojanowo in Greater Poland Voivodeship (west-central Poland)
- Bojanowo, Masovian Voivodeship (east-central Poland)
- Bojanowo, Pomeranian Voivodeship (north Poland)
