= Mirosław Koźlakiewicz =

Polish politician (born 1957)

Member of the Sejm
- Incumbent
- Assumed office 25 September 2005
- Constituency: 16 – Płock

Personal details
- Born: 1957 (age 68–69)
- Party: Civic Platform

Mirosław Koźlakiewicz (born 11 June 1957 in Kunki) is a Polish politician. He was elected to the Sejm on 25 September 2005, getting 7,475 votes in 16 Płock district as a candidate from the Civic Platform list.

He was also a member of Sejm 1997-2001.

== See also ==
- Members of Polish Sejm 2005-2007
