= Grądek =

- Village
- Location within Poland
- Coordinates: 53°2′N 20°11′E
- Country: Poland
- Voivodeship: Masovian
- County: Mława
- Gmina: Szreńsk

Grądek ([ˈɡrɔndɛk]) is a village in the administrative district of Gmina Szreńsk, within Mława County, Masovian Voivodeship, in east-central Poland. The village lies approximately 5 km (3 mi) north-east of Szreńsk, 16 km (10 mi) south-west of Mława, and 107 km (66 mi) north-west of Warsaw.
