= Górskie =

Górskie may refer to the following places:

- Górskie, Augustów County in Podlaskie Voivodeship (north-east Poland)
- Górskie, Bielsk County in Podlaskie Voivodeship (north-east Poland)
- Górskie, Kolno County in Podlaskie Voivodeship (north-east Poland)
