= Czolna =

Czolna may refer to the following places in Poland:

- Czołna, Lublin Voivodeship
- Czółna, Lublin Voivodeship
- Czółna, Łódź Voivodeship
