= Stara Kamionka =

Stara Kamionka may refer to the following places:

- Stara Kamionka, Augustów County in Podlaskie Voivodeship (north-east Poland)
- Stara Kamionka, Sokółka County in Podlaskie Voivodeship (north-east Poland)
- Stara Kamionka, Suwałki County in Podlaskie Voivodeship (north-east Poland)
