= Radawczyk =

- Village
- Location within Poland
- Coordinates: 51°10′N 22°23′E
- Country: Poland
- Voivodeship: Lublin
- County: Lublin
- Gmina: Niedrzwica Duża

Radawczyk [raˈdaft͡ʂɨk] is a village in the administrative district of Gmina Niedrzwica Duża, within Lublin County, Lublin Voivodeship, in eastern Poland.

Radawczyk used to have a large German population. There was a church of baptists ("kapela"), later transformed into a depot; it burnt down in 2001.

The Ciemięnga river flows through the village. The name of the village is related to two older nearby villages (Radawiec Mały and Radawiec Duży).
