= Liberadz =

- Village
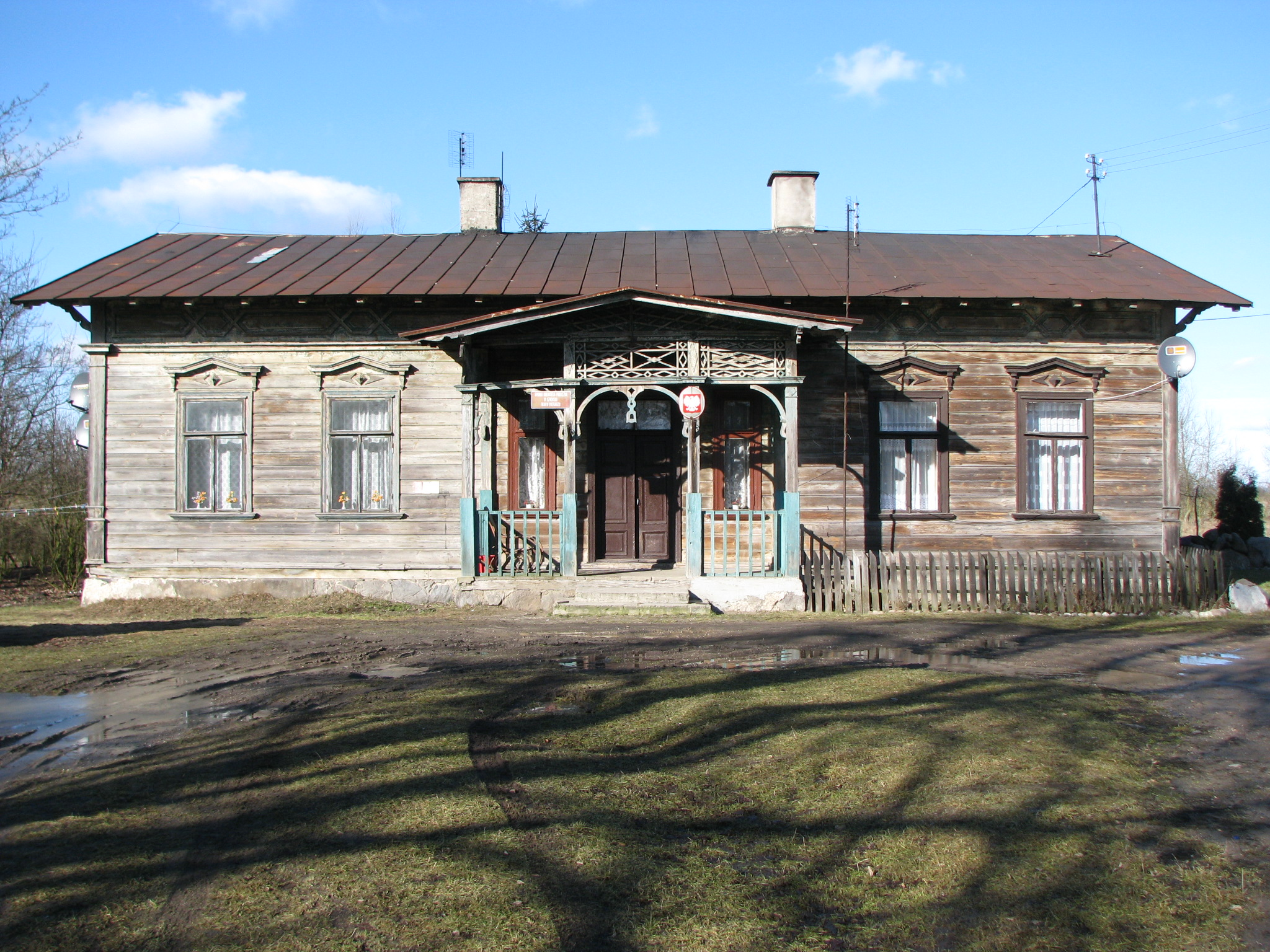
- A wooden dworek in Liberadz

- Location within Poland
- Coordinates: 53°0′N 20°12′E
- Country: Poland
- Voivodeship: Masovian
- County: Mława
- Gmina: Szreńsk

Liberadz [liˈbɛrat͡s] is a village in the administrative district of Gmina Szreńsk, within Mława County, Masovian Voivodeship, in east-central Poland.
