= Przychód, Mława County =

Przychód
- Village
- Location within Poland
- Coordinates: 53°1′0″N 20°8′13″E
- Country: Poland
- Voivodeship: Masovian
- County: Mława
- Gmina: Szreńsk

Przychód [ˈpʂɨxut] is a village in the administrative district of Gmina Szreńsk, within Mława County, Masovian Voivodeship, in east-central Poland.
