= Warszawiaki =

- Village
- Location within Poland
- Coordinates: 51°06′24″N 22°20′23″E
- Country: Poland
- Voivodeship: Lublin
- County: Lublin
- Gmina: Niedrzwica Duża

Warszawiaki [varʂaˈvjaki] is a village in the administrative district of Gmina Niedrzwica Duża, within Lublin County, Lublin Voivodeship, in eastern Poland.
