= Tajno Podjeziorne =

- Village
- Location within Poland
- Coordinates: 53°43′N 22°52′E
- Country: Poland
- Voivodeship: Podlaskie
- County: Augustów
- Gmina: Bargłów Kościelny

Tajno Podjeziorne [ˈtai̯nɔ pɔdjɛˈʑɔrnɛ] is a village in the administrative district of Gmina Bargłów Kościelny, within Augustów County, Podlaskie Voivodeship, in north-eastern Poland.
