= Janki, Gostynin County =

Janki
- Village
- Location within Poland
- Coordinates: 52°19′44″N 19°39′55″E
- Country: Poland
- Voivodeship: Masovian
- County: Gostynin
- Gmina: Szczawin Kościelny

Janki [ˈjanki] is a village in the administrative district of Gmina Szczawin Kościelny, within Gostynin County, Masovian Voivodeship, in east-central Poland.
