= Niedrzwica Duża =

- Village
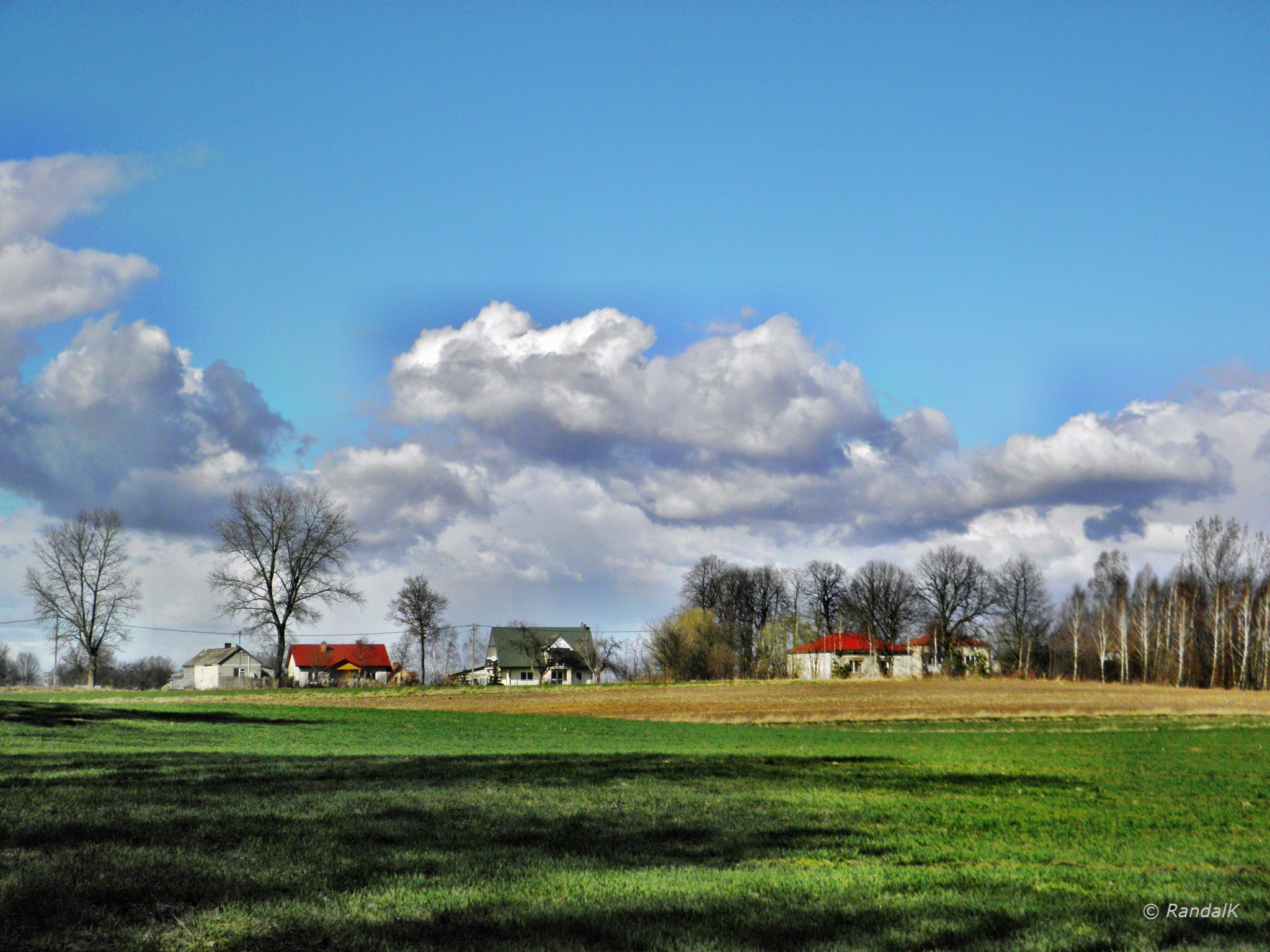

- Location within Poland
- Coordinates: 51°6′48″N 22°23′12″E
- Country: Poland
- Voivodeship: Lublin
- County: Lublin
- Gmina: Niedrzwica Duża

Population
  - Total: 3,300
- Time zone: UTC+1 (CET)
  - Summer (DST): UTC+2 (CEST)
- Postal code: 24-220
- Vehicle registration: LUB

Niedrzwica Duża [ɲɛdʐˈvit͡sa ˈduʐa] is a village in Lublin County, Lublin Voivodeship, in eastern Poland. It is the seat of the gmina (administrative district) called Gmina Niedrzwica Duża.

== History ==
In 1827, Niedrzwica Duża had a population of 674.

According to the 1921 census, the village with the adjacent colony and railway settlement had a population of 1,658, 98.4% Polish and 1.5% Jewish.

Following the joint German-Soviet invasion of Poland, which started World War II in September 1939, the village was occupied by Germany. A local unit of the Home Army resistance organization was established. Activities included intelligence, sabotage and an attack on a Baudienst camp in nearby Zemborzyce. In 1944, it took part in the Operation Tempest. In 1944, the village was occupied by the Soviet Union, and the NKVD launched a raid on the Polish resistance. In the village, the Soviets held a show trial of four members of the Polish resistance and sentenced them to death. Other resistance members managed to escape and continued their resistance within the newly formed Freedom and Independence Association. Faced with many losses, they eventually decided to escape under false names through Czechoslovakia to the American-occupied zone of Germany. They were caught by the Czechs at the border and returned to Poland. After returning to Niedrzwica, they continued their resistance, however, they soon relocated to Jelenia Góra and Rybnica, and continued their resistance there.

== Transport ==
The S19 highway passes through Niedrzwica Duża, and there is a railway station in the village.
