= Gradzanowo Włościańskie =

- Village
- Location within Poland
- Coordinates: 52°55′N 20°8′E
- Country: Poland
- Voivodeship: Masovian
- County: Mława
- Gmina: Radzanów

Gradzanowo Włościańskie (Polish pronunciation: [ɡradzaˈnɔvɔ vwɔɕˈtɕaj̃skʲɛ]) is a village in the administrative district of Gmina Radzanów, within Mława County, Masovian Voivodeship, in east-central Poland.
