= Krebsówka =

- Village
- Location within Poland
- Coordinates: 51°06′48″N 22°25′30″E
- Country: Poland
- Voivodeship: Lublin
- County: Lublin
- Gmina: Niedrzwica Duża

Population
  - Total: 280

Krebsówka [krɛpˈsufka] is a village in the administrative district of Gmina Niedrzwica Duża, within Lublin County, Lublin Voivodeship, in eastern Poland.

In 2007 the village had a population of 280.
