= Miączyn Duży =

- Village
- Location within Poland
- Coordinates: 52°59′N 20°14′E
- Country: Poland
- Voivodeship: Masovian
- County: Mława
- Gmina: Szreńsk
- Population: 520

Miączyn Duży [ˈmjɔnt͡ʂɨn ˈduʐɨ] is a village in the administrative district of Gmina Szreńsk, within Mława County, Masovian Voivodeship, in east-central Poland.
