= Helenów, Gmina Szczawin Kościelny =

Helenów
- Village
- Location within Poland
- Coordinates: 52°18′57″N 19°37′48″E
- Country: Poland
- Voivodeship: Masovian
- County: Gostynin
- Gmina: Szczawin Kościelny
- Time zone: UTC+1 (CET)
  - Summer (DST): UTC+2 (CEST)

Helenów [xɛˈlɛnuf] is a village in the administrative district of Gmina Szczawin Kościelny, within Gostynin County, Masovian Voivodeship, in central Poland.
