= Gmina Niedrzwica Duża =

Gmina Niedrzwica Duża Niedrzwica Duża Commune
- Gmina
- Coat of arms
- Interactive map of Gmina Niedrzwica Duża
- Coordinates (Niedrzwica Duża): 51°6′48″N 22°23′12″E
- Country: Poland
- Voivodeship: Lublin
- County: Lublin County
- Seat: Niedrzwica Duża

Area
  - Total: 106.82 km^{2} (41.24 sq mi)

Population (2019)
  - Total: 11,906
  - Density: 111.46/km^{2} (288.68/sq mi)
- Website: http://www.niedrzwicaduza.pl

Gmina Niedrzwica Duża is a rural gmina (administrative district) in Lublin County, Lublin Voivodeship, in eastern Poland. Its seat is the village of Niedrzwica Duża, which lies approximately 20 kilometres (12 mi) south-west of the regional capital Lublin.

The gmina covers an area of 106.82 square kilometres (41.2 sq mi), and as of 2019 its total population is 11,906 (11,631 in 2013).

== Villages ==
Gmina Niedrzwica Duża contains the villages and settlements of Borkowizna, Czółna, Krebsówka, Krężnica Jara, Majdan Sobieszczański, Marianka, Niedrzwica Duża, Niedrzwica Kościelna, Niedrzwica Kościelna-Kolonia, Osmolice-Kolonia, Radawczyk, Radawczyk-Kolonia Pierwsza, Sobieszczany, Sobieszczany-Kolonia, Strzeszkowice Duże, Strzeszkowice Małe, Tomaszówka, Trojaczkowice, Warszawiaki and Załucze.

== Neighbouring gminas ==
Gmina Niedrzwica Duża is bordered by the city of Lublin and by the gminas of Bełżyce, Borzechów, Głusk, Konopnica, Strzyżewice and Wilkołaz.
