= Bułkowizna =

- Village
- Location within Poland
- Coordinates: 53°42′N 22°47′E
- Country: Poland
- Voivodeship: Podlaskie
- County: Augustów
- Gmina: Bargłów Kościelny
- Population (approx.): 129

Bułkowizna [buu̯kɔˈvizna] is a village in the administrative district of Gmina Bargłów Kościelny, within Augustów County, Podlaskie Voivodeship, in north-eastern Poland.
