= Solistówka =

- Village
- Location within Poland
- Coordinates: 53°45′25″N 22°45′19″E
- Country: Poland
- Voivodeship: Podlaskie
- County: Augustów
- Gmina: Bargłów Kościelny

Solistówka [sɔlisˈtufka] is a village in the administrative district of Gmina Bargłów Kościelny, within Augustów County, Podlaskie Voivodeship, in north-eastern Poland.
