= Holendry Dobrowskie =

- Village
- Location within Poland
- Coordinates: 52°18′56″N 19°36′30″E
- Country: Poland
- Voivodeship: Masovian
- County: Gostynin
- Gmina: Szczawin Kościelny

Holendry Dobrowskie [xɔˈlɛndrɨ dɔˈbrɔfskʲɛ] is a village in the administrative district of Gmina Szczawin Kościelny, within Gostynin County, Masovian Voivodeship, in east-central Poland.
