= Witoldów, Gostynin County =

Witoldów
- Village
- Location within Poland
- Coordinates: 52°18′59″N 19°33′25″E
- Country: Poland
- Voivodeship: Masovian
- County: Gostynin
- Gmina: Szczawin Kościelny

Witoldów (Polish pronunciation: [viˈtɔlduf]) is a village in the administrative district of Gmina Szczawin Kościelny, within Gostynin County, Masovian Voivodeship, in east-central Poland.
