= Annopol, Gostynin County =

Annopol
- Village
- Location within Poland
- Coordinates: 52°25′N 19°38′E
- Country: Poland
- Voivodeship: Masovian
- County: Gostynin
- Gmina: Szczawin Kościelny
- Time zone: UTC+1 (CET)
  - Summer (DST): UTC+2 (CEST)

Annopol [anˈnɔpɔl] is a village in the administrative district of Gmina Szczawin Kościelny, within Gostynin County, Masovian Voivodeship, in central Poland.
