= Komorniki, Podlaskie Voivodeship =

Komorniki
- Village
- Location within Poland
- Coordinates: 53°45′01″N 22°53′12″E
- Country: Poland
- Voivodeship: Podlaskie
- County: Augustów
- Gmina: Bargłów Kościelny

Komorniki [kɔmɔrˈniki] is a village in the administrative district of Gmina Bargłów Kościelny, within Augustów County, Podlaskie Voivodeship, in north-eastern Poland.
