= Martin Rosenberg =

Polish composer

- Born: December 24, 1890; Szreńsk, Poland
- Died: c1942 Auschwitz concentration camp
- Occupations: singer, composer
- Known for: Collection of music composed in Nazi concentration camps

Martin Rosenberg (12 December 1890 – 1942) known as Rosebery d'Arguto was a Polish singer and a political prisoner during the World War II occupation of Poland.

== Life ==
Martin Rosebery was born in 1890 as the second of seven children of a grain merchant in Shrensk in the Russian-occupied part of Poland under the name Moshe Rosenberg. He developed artistic talent and political interest. After joining the Polish independence movement in Warsaw in 1905, which is why he was persecuted by the Russian police, he fled to Austria a short time later to avoid further persecution. He studied music in Vienna and then Italy and eventually received his habilitation.

At the beginning of the 1920s, Rosebery d'Arguto went to Germany. In Berlin-Neukölln, he took over a mixed choir of the workers' singers' movement that had existed since 1890 and transformed it into a choral society with high musical standards. In the years that followed, the association, which soon called itself the "Rosebery d'Arguto" singing community, specialized in pedagogical work and helped working-class children to receive a musical education.

With the repression of the workers' music movement after 1933, the Jew, disparagingly referred to by the National Socialists as "Martin Rozenberg", also came under increasing pressure. This was followed by bans on the choir performing under his direction and finally a professional ban. In 1939, shortly before the German invasion of Poland, Rosebery d'Arguto left Germany, but returned to Berlin a short time later for important errands. There he was immediately arrested by the Gestapo and deported to the Sachsenhausen concentration camp near Oranienburg on September 13, 1939. In Sachsenhausen, he secretly set up a choir of Jewish prisoners in blocks 37 and 38 and tried to continue his work.

On October 8, 1942, he was transferred to the Dachau concentration camp. In compliance with Hitler's order from the same year, according to which all Jews still in the Reich were to be deported to Auschwitz-Birkenau, Rosebery d'Arguto was also taken on a train to the extermination camp on October 19, 1942. It is unclear whether he died on the way or was killed immediately upon arrival, as his name does not appear in any Auschwitz camp list.
