= Krężnica Jara =

- Village
- Location within Poland
- Coordinates: 51°9′N 22°29′E
- Country: Poland
- Voivodeship: Lublin
- County: Lublin
- Gmina: Niedrzwica Duża

Population
  - Total: 1,100

Krężnica Jara [krɛ̃ʐˈnit͡sa ˈjara] is a village in the administrative district of Gmina Niedrzwica Duża, within Lublin County, Lublin Voivodeship, in eastern Poland.

Population - 1364 (2011).
