= Bońkowo-Podleśne =

- Village
- Location within Poland
- Coordinates: 52°57′38″N 20°11′18″E
- Country: Poland
- Voivodeship: Masovian
- County: Mława
- Gmina: Radzanów

Bońkowo-Podleśne [bɔɲˈkɔvɔ pɔdˈlɛɕnɛ] is a village in the administrative district of Gmina Radzanów, within Mława County, Masovian Voivodeship, in east-central Poland.
