= Józefowo, Gmina Radzanów =

Józefowo
- Village
- Location within Poland
- Coordinates: 52°55′32″N 20°9′6″E
- Country: Poland
- Voivodeship: Masovian
- County: Mława
- Gmina: Radzanów

Józefowo (Polish pronunciation: [juzɛˈfɔvɔ]) is a village in the administrative district of Gmina Radzanów, within Mława County, Masovian Voivodeship, in east-central Poland.
