= Pieńki, Augustów County =

Village in Gmina Bargłów Kościelny, Poland

Pieńki
- Village
- Location within Poland
- Coordinates: 53°43′43″N 22°53′06″E
- Country: Poland
- Voivodeship: Podlaskie
- County: Augustów
- Gmina: Bargłów Kościelny

Pieńki [ˈpjɛɲki] is a village in the administrative district of Gmina Bargłów Kościelny, within Augustów County, Podlaskie Voivodeship, in north-eastern Poland.
