= Stare Tajno =

- Village
- Location within Poland
- Coordinates: 53°42′43″N 22°49′36″E
- Country: Poland
- Voivodeship: Podlaskie
- County: Augustów
- Gmina: Bargłów Kościelny

Stare Tajno [ˈstarɛ ˈtai̯nɔ] is a village in the administrative district of Gmina Bargłów Kościelny, within Augustów County, Podlaskie Voivodeship, in north-eastern Poland.
