= Stefanów Suserski =

- Village
- Location within Poland
- Coordinates: 52°20′N 19°36′E
- Country: Poland
- Voivodeship: Masovian
- County: Gostynin
- Gmina: Szczawin Kościelny
- Time zone: UTC+1 (CET)
  - Summer (DST): UTC+2 (CEST)
- Vehicle registration: WGS

Stefanów Suserski [stɛˈfanuf suˈsɛrski] is a village in the administrative district of Gmina Szczawin Kościelny, within Gostynin County, Masovian Voivodeship, in central Poland.
