= Kresy, Podlaskie Voivodeship =

Kresy
- Settlement
- Location within Poland
- Coordinates: 53°44′50″N 22°48′28″E
- Country: Poland
- Voivodeship: Podlaskie
- County: Augustów
- Gmina: Bargłów Kościelny

Kresy [ˈkrɛsɨ] is a settlement in the administrative district of Gmina Bargłów Kościelny, within Augustów County, Podlaskie Voivodeship, in north-eastern Poland.
