= Swoboda, Gostynin County =

Swoboda
- Village
- Location within Poland
- Coordinates: 52°18′N 19°32′E
- Country: Poland
- Voivodeship: Masovian
- County: Gostynin
- Gmina: Szczawin Kościelny

Swoboda [sfɔˈbɔda] is a village in the administrative district of Gmina Szczawin Kościelny, within Gostynin County, Masovian Voivodeship, in east-central Poland.
