= Sobieszczany-Kolonia =

- Village
- Location within Poland
- Coordinates: 51°03′45″N 22°22′58″E
- Country: Poland
- Voivodeship: Lublin
- County: Lublin
- Gmina: Niedrzwica Duża

Sobieszczany-Kolonia [sɔbjɛʂˈt͡ʂanɨ kɔˈlɔɲa] is a village in the administrative district of Gmina Niedrzwica Duża, within Lublin County, Lublin Voivodeship, in eastern Poland.
