= Miączyn Mały =

- Village
- Location within Poland
- Coordinates: 53°0′N 20°14′E
- Country: Poland
- Voivodeship: Masovian
- County: Mława
- Gmina: Szreńsk

Miączyn Mały [ˈmjɔnt͡ʂɨn ˈmawɨ] is a village in the administrative district of Gmina Szreńsk, within Mława County, Masovian Voivodeship, in east-central Poland.
