= Barszcze =

- Village
- Location within Poland
- Coordinates: 53°45′N 22°46′E
- Country: Poland
- Voivodeship: Podlaskie
- County: Augustów
- Gmina: Bargłów Kościelny
- Population: 130

Barszcze [ˈbaɾʂt͡ʂɛ] is a village in the administrative district of Gmina Bargłów Kościelny, within Augustów County, Podlaskie Voivodeship, in north-eastern Poland.
