= Gradzanowo Zbęskie =

- Village
- Location within Poland
- Coordinates: 52°54′N 20°7′E
- Country: Poland
- Voivodeship: Masovian
- County: Mława
- Gmina: Radzanów

Gradzanowo Zbęskie [ɡrad͡zaˈnɔvɔ ˈzbɛ̃skʲɛ] is a village in the administrative district of Gmina Radzanów, within Mława County, Masovian Voivodeship, in east-central Poland.
