= Tajenko =

- Village
- Location within Poland
- Coordinates: 53°42′N 22°53′E
- Country: Poland
- Voivodeship: Podlaskie
- County: Augustów
- Gmina: Bargłów Kościelny

Tajenko [taˈjɛŋkɔ] is a village in the administrative district of Gmina Bargłów Kościelny, within Augustów County, Podlaskie Voivodeship, in north-eastern Poland.
