= Trębki =

- Village
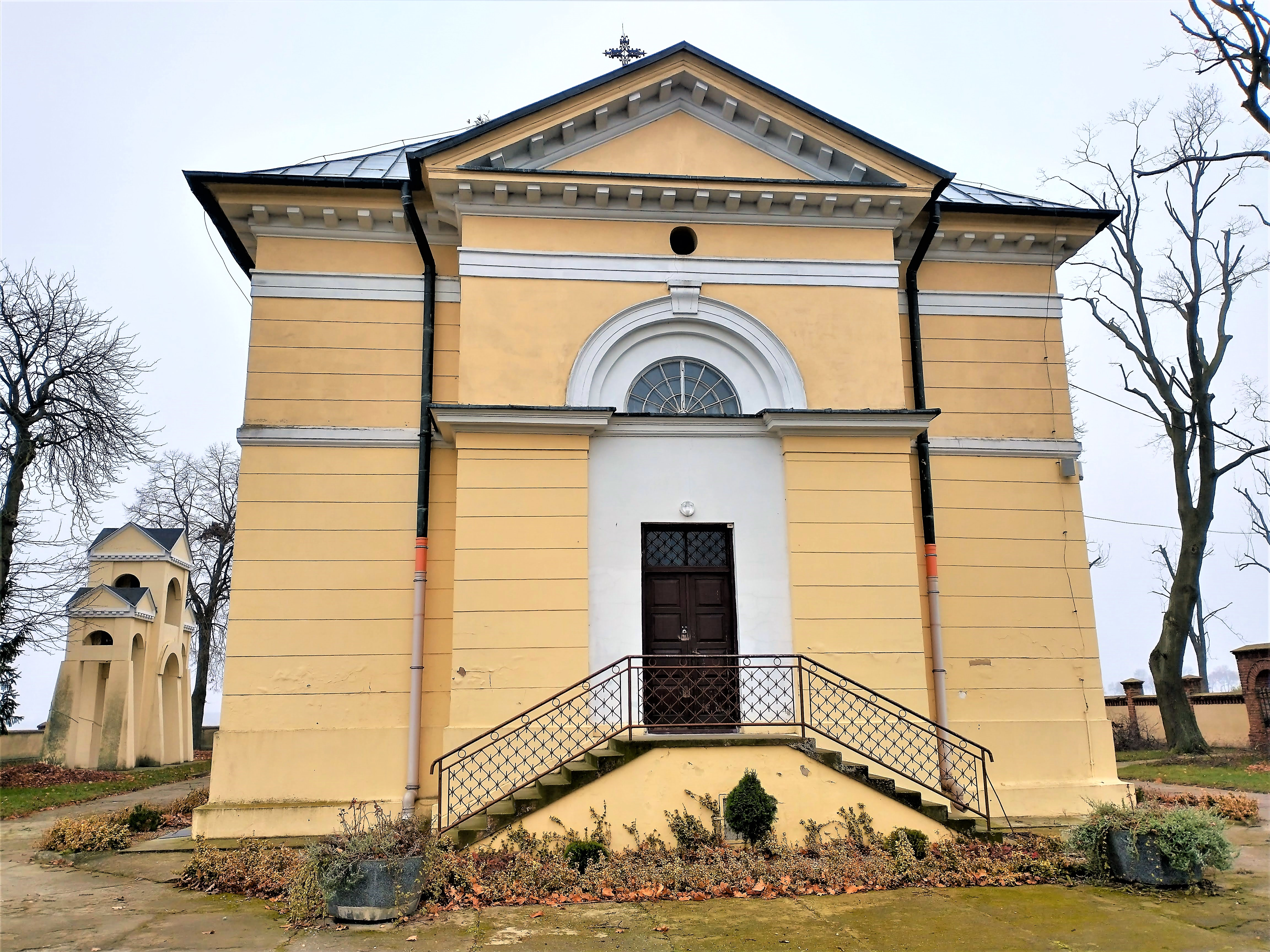
- St. Stanislaus Kostka church in Trębki

- Location within Poland
- Coordinates: 52°19′13″N 19°32′9″E
- Country: Poland
- Voivodeship: Masovian
- County: Gostynin
- Gmina: Szczawin Kościelny
- Time zone: UTC+1 (CET)
  - Summer (DST): UTC+2 (CEST)
- Vehicle registration: WGS

Trębki [ˈtrɛmpki] is a village in the administrative district of Gmina Szczawin Kościelny, within Gostynin County, Masovian Voivodeship, in central Poland.

Town rights were granted before 1578 and revoked before 1625. It was a private town, administratively located in the Gostynin County in the Rawa Voivodeship in the Greater Poland Province of the Kingdom of Poland.
