= Osmolice-Kolonia =

- Village
- Location within Poland
- Coordinates: 51°06′11″N 22°26′22″E
- Country: Poland
- Voivodeship: Lublin
- County: Lublin
- Gmina: Niedrzwica Duża

Osmolice-Kolonia [ɔsmɔˈlit͡sɛ kɔˈlɔɲa] is a village in the administrative district of Gmina Niedrzwica Duża, within Lublin County, Lublin Voivodeship, in eastern Poland.
