= Trzciniec, Mława County =

Trzciniec
- Village
- Location within Poland
- Coordinates: 52°56′N 20°10′E
- Country: Poland
- Voivodeship: Masovian
- County: Mława
- Gmina: Radzanów

Trzciniec [ˈtʂt͡ɕiɲɛt͡s] is a village in the administrative district of Gmina Radzanów, within Mława County, Masovian Voivodeship, in east-central Poland.
