= Sewerynów, Gostynin County =

Village in Gmina Szczawin Kościelny, Poland

Sewerynów
- Village
- Location within Poland
- Coordinates: 52°21′48″N 19°38′18″E
- Country: Poland
- Voivodeship: Masovian
- County: Gostynin
- Gmina: Szczawin Kościelny

Sewerynów [sɛvɛˈrɨnuf] is a village in the administrative district of Gmina Szczawin Kościelny, within Gostynin County, Masovian Voivodeship, in east-central Poland.
