= Gmina Szreńsk =

Gmina Szreńsk Szreńsk Commune
- Gmina
- Coat of arms
- Interactive map of Gmina Szreńsk
- Coordinates (Szreńsk): 53°1′N 20°7′E
- Country: Poland
- Voivodeship: Masovian
- County: Mława
- Seat: Szreńsk

Area
  - Total: 109.66 km^{2} (42.34 sq mi)

Population (2013)
  - Total: 4,366
  - Density: 39.81/km^{2} (103.1/sq mi)

Gmina Szreńsk is a rural gmina (administrative district) in Mława County, Masovian Voivodeship, in east-central Poland. Its seat is the village of Szreńsk, approximately 21 kilometres (13 mi) south-west of Mława and 107 km (66 mi) north-west of Warsaw.

The gmina covers an area of 109.66 square kilometres (42.3 sq mi), and as of 2006 its total population is 4,537 (4,366 in 2013).

== Villages ==
Gmina Szreńsk contains the villages and settlements of Bielawy, Doziny, Grądek, Kobuszyn, Krzywki-Bośki, Krzywki-Piaski, Kunki, Liberadz, Ługi, Miączyn Duży, Miączyn Mały, Miłotki, Mostowo, Nowe Garkowo, Ostrów, Pączkowo, Proszkowo, Przychód, Rochnia, Sławkowo, Stare Garkowo, Szreńsk, Wola Proszkowska and Złotowo.

== Neighbouring gminas ==
Gmina Szreńsk is bordered by the gminas of Bieżuń, Kuczbork-Osada, Lipowiec Kościelny, Radzanów, Strzegowo, Wiśniewo and Żuromin.
