= Szczawin Borowy-Kolonia =

- Village
- Location within Poland
- Coordinates: 52°21′40″N 19°38′55″E
- Country: Poland
- Voivodeship: Masovian
- County: Gostynin
- Gmina: Szczawin Kościelny

Szczawin Borowy-Kolonia [ˈʂt͡ʂavin bɔˈrɔvɨ kɔˈlɔɲa] is a village in the administrative district of Gmina Szczawin Kościelny, within Gostynin County, Masovian Voivodeship, in east-central Poland.
