= Radawczyk-Kolonia Pierwsza =

- Village
- Location within Poland
- Coordinates: 51°10′12″N 22°23′14″E
- Country: Poland
- Voivodeship: Lublin
- County: Lublin
- Gmina: Niedrzwica Duża

Radawczyk-Kolonia Pierwsza [raˈdaft͡ʂɨk kɔˈlɔɲa ˈpjɛrfʂa] is a village in the administrative district of Gmina Niedrzwica Duża, within Lublin County, Lublin Voivodeship, in eastern Poland.
