= Strzeszkowice Małe =

- Village
- Location within Poland
- Coordinates: 51°9′N 22°26′E
- Country: Poland
- Voivodeship: Lublin
- County: Lublin
- Gmina: Niedrzwica Duża

Strzeszkowice Małe [stʂɛʂkɔˈvit͡sɛ ˈmawɛ] is a village in the administrative district of Gmina Niedrzwica Duża, within Lublin County, Lublin Voivodeship, in eastern Poland.
