= Bębnowo =

- Village
- Location within Poland
- Coordinates: 52°55′N 20°6′E
- Country: Poland
- Voivodeship: Masovian
- County: Mława
- Gmina: Radzanów
- Population: 140

Bębnowo [bɛmbˈnɔvɔ] is a village in the administrative district of Gmina Radzanów, within Mława County, Masovian Voivodeship, in east-central Poland.
