= Bębnówko =

- Village
- Location within Poland
- Coordinates: 52°54′26″N 20°4′7″E
- Country: Poland
- Voivodeship: Masovian
- County: Mława
- Gmina: Radzanów
- Population: 60

Bębnówko [bɛmbˈnufkɔ] is a village in the administrative district of Gmina Radzanów, within Mława County, Masovian Voivodeship, in east-central Poland.
