= Nowa Kamionka, Augustów County =

Nowa Kamionka
- Village
- Location within Poland
- Coordinates: 53°49′15″N 22°47′16″E
- Country: Poland
- Voivodeship: Podlaskie
- County: Augustów
- Gmina: Bargłów Kościelny

Nowa Kamionka [ˈnɔva kaˈmjɔŋka] is a village in the administrative district of Gmina Bargłów Kościelny, within Augustów County, Podlaskie Voivodeship, in north-eastern Poland.
