= Przychód, Gostynin County =

Przychód
- Village
- Location within Poland
- Coordinates: 52°21′33″N 19°36′20″E
- Country: Poland
- Voivodeship: Masovian
- County: Gostynin
- Gmina: Szczawin Kościelny

Przychód [ˈpʂɨxut] is a village in the administrative district of Gmina Szczawin Kościelny, within Gostynin County, Masovian Voivodeship, in east-central Poland.
