= Ratowo-Leśniczówka =

- Village
- Location within Poland
- Coordinates: 52°56′50″N 20°07′55″E
- Country: Poland
- Voivodeship: Masovian
- County: Mława
- Gmina: Radzanów

Ratowo-Leśniczówka (Polish pronunciation: [raˈtɔvɔ lɛɕɲiˈtʂufka]) is a village in the administrative district of Gmina Radzanów, within Mława County, Masovian Voivodeship, in east-central Poland.
