= Helenów Słupski =

Village in Gmina Szczawin Kościelny, Poland

- Village
- Location within Poland
- Coordinates: 52°24′3″N 19°36′32″E
- Country: Poland
- Voivodeship: Masovian
- County: Gostynin
- Gmina: Szczawin Kościelny
- Population: 173

Helenów Słupski [xɛˈlɛnuf ˈswupski] is a village in the administrative district of Gmina Szczawin Kościelny, within Gostynin County, Masovian Voivodeship, in east-central Poland.
