= Gradzanowo Zbęskie-Kolonia =

Village in Gmina Radzanów, Poland

- Village
- Location within Poland
- Coordinates: 52°52′47″N 20°06′47″E
- Country: Poland
- Voivodeship: Masovian
- County: Mława
- Gmina: Radzanów

Gradzanowo Zbęskie-Kolonia [ɡrad͡zaˈnɔvɔ ˈzbɛ̃skʲɛ kɔˈlɔɲa] is a village in the administrative district of Gmina Radzanów, within Mława County, Masovian Voivodeship, in east-central Poland.
