= Zgliczyn-Glinki =

- Village
- Location within Poland
- Coordinates: 52°57′54″N 20°02′59″E
- Country: Poland
- Voivodeship: Masovian
- County: Mława
- Gmina: Radzanów

Zgliczyn-Glinki [ˈzɡlit͡ʂɨn ˈɡliŋki] is a village in the administrative district of Gmina Radzanów, within Mława County, Masovian Voivodeship, in east-central Poland.
