= Stare Nowiny =

- Village
- Location within Poland
- Coordinates: 53°43′20″N 22°53′13″E
- Country: Poland
- Voivodeship: Podlaskie
- County: Augustów
- Gmina: Bargłów Kościelny

Stare Nowiny [ˈstarɛ nɔˈvinɨ] is a village in the administrative district of Gmina Bargłów Kościelny, within Augustów County, Podlaskie Voivodeship, in north-eastern Poland.
