= Marianka, Lublin County =

Marianka
- Village
- Location within Poland
- Coordinates: 51°5′N 22°24′E
- Country: Poland
- Voivodeship: Lublin
- County: Lublin
- Gmina: Niedrzwica Duża

Population
  - Total: 242
- Time zone: UTC+1 (CET)
  - Summer (DST): UTC+2 (CEST)

Marianka [maˈrjaŋka] is a village in the administrative district of Gmina Niedrzwica Duża, within Lublin County, Lublin Voivodeship, in eastern Poland.

== History ==
Three Polish citizens were murdered by Nazi Germany in the village during World War II.
