= Popowo, Augustów County =

Popowo
- Village
- Location within Poland
- Coordinates: 53°47′19″N 22°43′52″E
- Country: Poland
- Voivodeship: Podlaskie
- County: Augustów
- Gmina: Bargłów Kościelny

Popowo [pɔˈpɔvɔ] is a village in the administrative district of Gmina Bargłów Kościelny, within Augustów County, Podlaskie Voivodeship, in north-eastern Poland.
