= Strzeszkowice Duże =

- Village
- Location within Poland
- Coordinates: 51°9′N 22°24′E
- Country: Poland
- Voivodeship: Lublin
- County: Lublin
- Gmina: Niedrzwica Duża

Strzeszkowice Duże [stʂɛʂkɔˈvit͡sɛ ˈduʐɛ] is a village in the administrative district of Gmina Niedrzwica Duża, within Lublin County, Lublin Voivodeship, in eastern Poland.
