= Dreństwo =

- Village
- Location within Poland
- Coordinates: 53°44′N 22°45′E
- Country: Poland
- Voivodeship: Podlaskie
- County: Augustów
- Gmina: Bargłów Kościelny

Dreństwo [ˈdrɛɲstvɔ] (also: Dręstwo) is a village in the administrative district of Gmina Bargłów Kościelny, within Augustów County, Podlaskie Voivodeship, in north-eastern Poland.
