= Ostrów, Mława County =

Ostrów
- Village
- Location within Poland
- Coordinates: 53°0′47″N 20°12′13″E
- Country: Poland
- Voivodeship: Masovian
- County: Mława
- Gmina: Szreńsk

Population
  - Total: 100
- Time zone: UTC+1 (CET)
  - Summer (DST): UTC+2 (CEST)

Ostrów [ˈɔstruf] is a village in the administrative district of Gmina Szreńsk, within Mława County, Masovian Voivodeship, in north-central Poland.
