= Sosnowo, Gmina Bargłów Kościelny =

Sosnowo
- Settlement
- Location within Poland
- Coordinates: 53°47′57″N 22°43′32″E
- Country: Poland
- Voivodeship: Podlaskie
- County: Augustów
- Gmina: Bargłów Kościelny

Sosnowo [sɔsˈnɔvɔ] is a settlement in the administrative district of Gmina Bargłów Kościelny, within Augustów County, Podlaskie Voivodeship, in north-eastern Poland.
