= Sobieszczany =

- Village
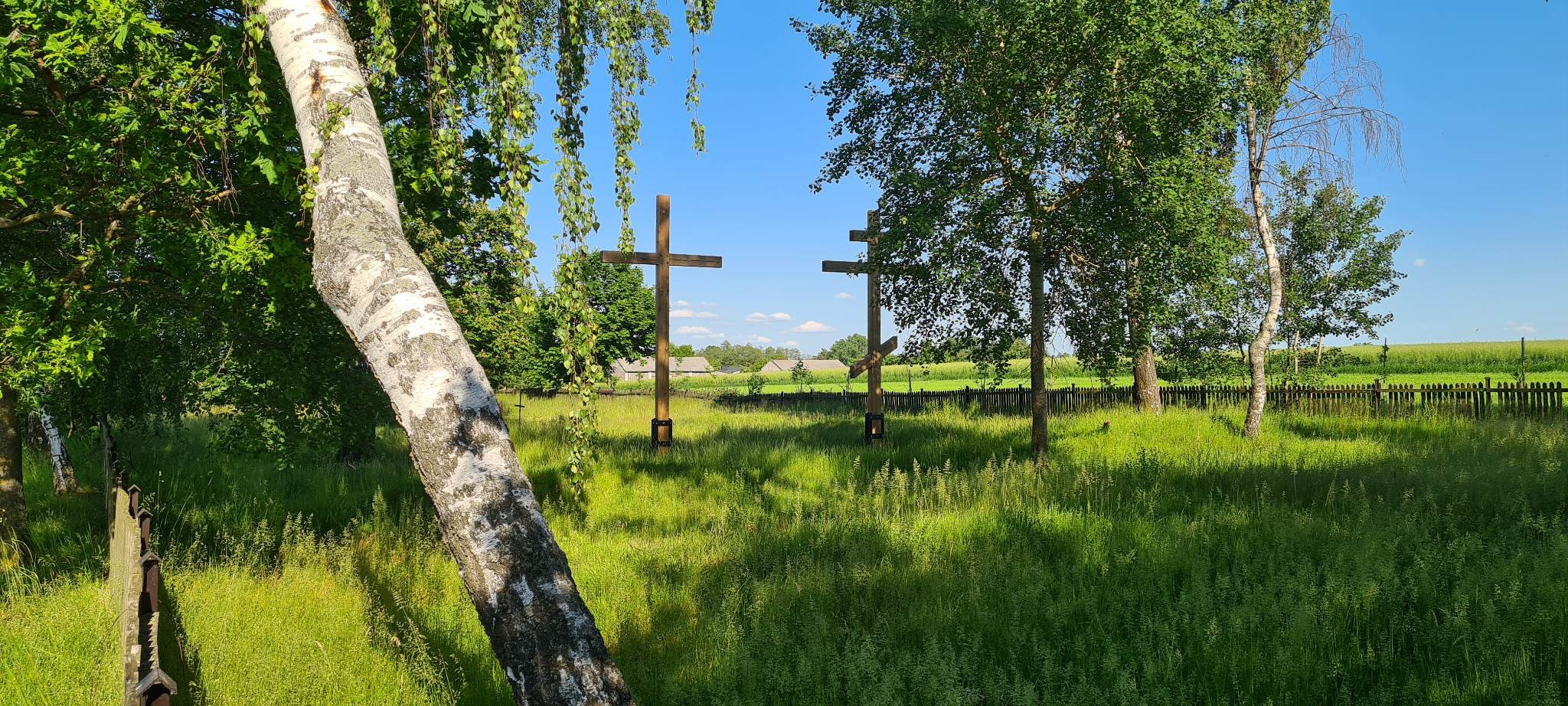

- Location within Poland
- Coordinates: 51°4′N 22°22′E
- Country: Poland
- Voivodeship: Lublin
- County: Lublin
- Gmina: Niedrzwica Duża

Sobieszczany [sɔbjɛʂˈt͡ʂanɨ] is a village in the administrative district of Gmina Niedrzwica Duża, within Lublin County, Lublin Voivodeship, in eastern Poland.
