= Trojaczkowice =

- Village
- Location within Poland
- Coordinates: 51°10′47″N 22°25′38″E
- Country: Poland
- Voivodeship: Lublin
- County: Lublin
- Gmina: Niedrzwica Duża

Population
  - Total: 90

Trojaczkowice [trɔjat͡ʂkɔˈvit͡sɛ] is a village in the administrative district of Gmina Niedrzwica Duża, within Lublin County, Lublin Voivodeship, in eastern Poland.
