= Kukowo, Podlaskie Voivodeship =

Kukowo
- Village
- Location within Poland
- Coordinates: 53°49′52″N 22°41′21″E
- Country: Poland
- Voivodeship: Podlaskie
- County: Augustów
- Gmina: Bargłów Kościelny
- Population: 60

Kukowo [kuˈkɔvɔ] is a village in the administrative district of Gmina Bargłów Kościelny, within Augustów County, Podlaskie Voivodeship, in north-eastern Poland.
