= Waliszew, Masovian Voivodeship =

Waliszew
- Village
- Location within Poland
- Coordinates: 52°22′N 19°40′E
- Country: Poland
- Voivodeship: Masovian
- County: Gostynin
- Gmina: Szczawin Kościelny

Waliszew [vaˈliʂɛf] is a village in the administrative district of Gmina Szczawin Kościelny, within Gostynin County, Masovian Voivodeship, in east-central Poland.
