= Sławkowo, Mława County =

Sławkowo
- Village
- Location within Poland
- Coordinates: 52°59′N 20°4′E
- Country: Poland
- Voivodeship: Masovian
- County: Mława
- Gmina: Szreńsk
- Time zone: UTC+1 (CET)
  - Summer (DST): UTC+2 (CEST)

Sławkowo [swafˈkɔvɔ] is a village in the administrative district of Gmina Szreńsk, within Mława County, Masovian Voivodeship, in north-central Poland.
