= Luszewo, Mława County =

Luszewo
- Village
- Location within Poland
- Coordinates: 52°58′5″N 20°7′46″E
- Country: Poland
- Voivodeship: Masovian
- County: Mława
- Gmina: Radzanów

Luszewo [luˈʂɛvɔ] is a village in the administrative district of Gmina Radzanów, within Mława County, Masovian Voivodeship, in east-central Poland.
