= Zieluminek =

- Village
- Location within Poland
- Coordinates: 52°54′50″N 20°08′19″E
- Country: Poland
- Voivodeship: Masovian
- County: Mława
- Gmina: Radzanów

Zieluminek [ʑɛluˈminɛk] is a village in the administrative district of Gmina Radzanów, within Mława County, Masovian Voivodeship, in east-central Poland. Zieluminek is governed at the local level by the Radzanów commune, which oversees several nearby villages. As of a census in 2021 it has a population of 31.
