= Budki Suserskie =

- Village
- Location within Poland
- Coordinates: 52°20′N 19°36′E
- Country: Poland
- Voivodeship: Masovian
- County: Gostynin
- Gmina: Szczawin Kościelny

Budki Suserskie [ˈbutki suˈsɛrskʲɛ] is a village in the administrative district of Gmina Szczawin Kościelny, within Gostynin County, Masovian Voivodeship, in east-central Poland.
