= Budy-Matusy =

- Village
- Location within Poland
- Coordinates: 52°56′22″N 20°11′27″E
- Country: Poland
- Voivodeship: Masovian
- County: Mława
- Gmina: Radzanów

Budy-Matusy [ˈbudɨ maˈtusɨ] is a village in the administrative district of Gmina Radzanów, within Mława County, Masovian Voivodeship, in east-central Poland.
