= Tomaszówka, Lublin County =

Tomaszówka
- Village
- Location within Poland
- Coordinates: 51°8′N 22°23′E
- Country: Poland
- Voivodeship: Lublin
- County: Lublin
- Gmina: Niedrzwica Duża

Tomaszówka [tɔmaˈʂufka] is a village in the administrative district of Gmina Niedrzwica Duża, within Lublin County, Lublin Voivodeship, in eastern Poland.
