= Bielawy, Mława County =

Bielawy
- Village
- Location within Poland
- Coordinates: 52°59′N 20°6′E
- Country: Poland
- Voivodeship: Masovian
- County: Mława
- Gmina: Szreńsk
- Postal code: 06-550
- Vehicle registration: WML

Bielawy [bjɛˈlavɨ] is a village in the administrative district of Gmina Szreńsk, within Mława County, Masovian Voivodeship, in north-central Poland.
