= Radawiec Mały =

- Village
- Location within Poland
- Coordinates: 51°11′N 22°24′E
- Country: Poland
- Voivodeship: Lublin
- County: Lublin
- Gmina: Konopnica

Radawiec Mały [raˈdavjɛt͡s ˈmawɨ] is a village in the administrative district of Gmina Konopnica, within Lublin County, Lublin Voivodeship, in eastern Poland.
