= Stara Kamionka, Augustów County =

Stara Kamionka
- Village
- Location within Poland
- Coordinates: 53°48′N 22°48′E
- Country: Poland
- Voivodeship: Podlaskie
- County: Augustów
- Gmina: Bargłów Kościelny
- Population: 280

Stara Kamionka [ˈstara kaˈmjɔŋka] is a village in the administrative district of Gmina Bargłów Kościelny, within Augustów County, Podlaskie Voivodeship, in north-eastern Poland.
