= Szczawin Kościelny, Masovian Voivodeship =

Szczawin Kościelny
- Village
- Location within Poland
- Coordinates: 52°22′N 19°37′E
- Country: Poland
- Voivodeship: Masovian
- County: Gostynin
- Gmina: Szczawin Kościelny

Szczawin Kościelny [ˈʂt͡ʂavin kɔɕˈt͡ɕɛlnɨ] is a village in Gostynin County, Masovian Voivodeship, in east-central Poland. It is the seat of the gmina (administrative district) called Gmina Szczawin Kościelny.
