= Czółna =

- Village
- Location within Poland
- Coordinates: 51°8′N 22°19′E
- Country: Poland
- Voivodeship: Lublin
- County: Lublin
- Gmina: Niedrzwica Duża

Population (approx.)
  - Total: 430

Czółna [ˈt͡ʂuu̯na] is a village in the administrative district of Gmina Niedrzwica Duża, within Lublin County, Lublin Voivodeship, in eastern Poland.
