= Radzanów, Mława County =

Radzanów
- Village
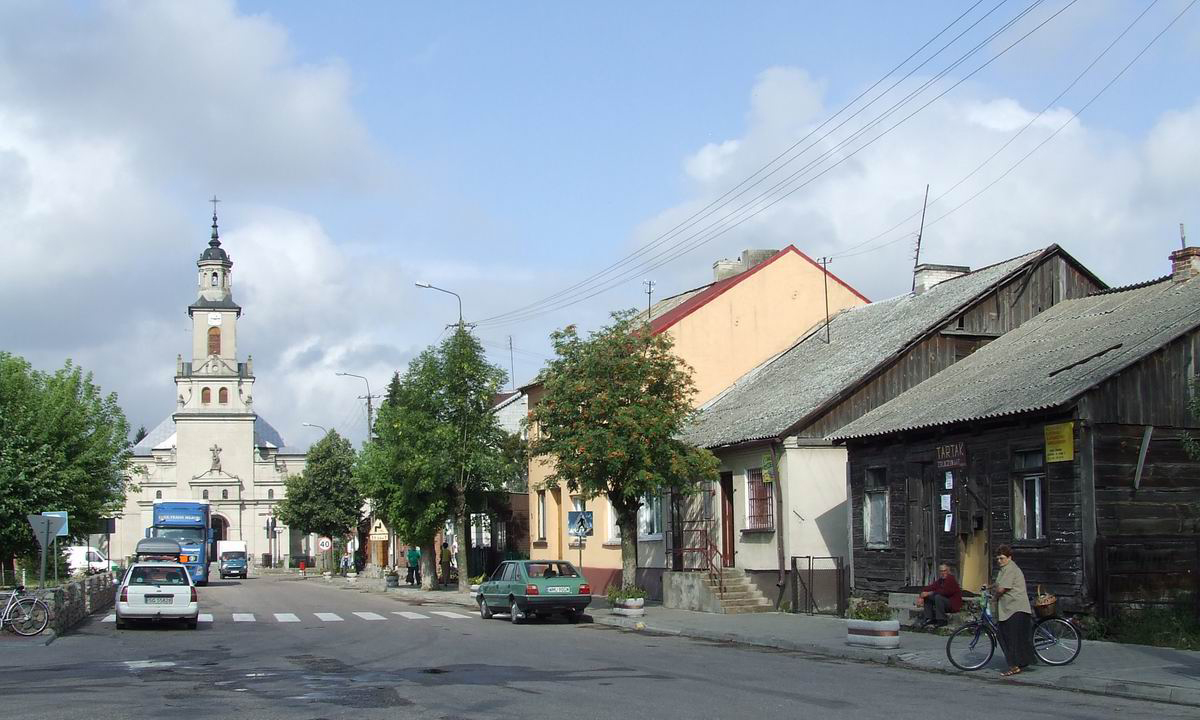
- Radzanów main square

- Coat of arms

- Location within Poland
- Coordinates: 52°56′N 20°5′E
- Country: Poland
- Voivodeship: Masovian
- County: Mława
- Gmina: Radzanów

Population
  - Total: 930
- Time zone: UTC+1 (CET)
  - Summer (DST): UTC+2 (CEST)
- Vehicle registration: WML
- Website: radzanow.com

Radzanów [raˈd͡zanuf] is a village in Mława County, Masovian Voivodeship, in east-central Poland, approximately 28 km (17 mi) south-west of Mława and 101 km (63 mi) north-west of Warsaw. It is the seat of the gmina (administrative district) called Gmina Radzanów.

The village lies on the Wkra river. It has a population of 930, with the population of the surrounding gmina exceeding 4,000 inhabitants.

== History ==
In the 13th century Radzanów was a residence of the Radzanowski noble family, which expired in 1630. They bore the Prawdzic coat of arms. The settlement received town privileges based on Chełmno rights in 1400 from Mazovian Prince Siemowit IV. It was a private town of Polish nobility, administratively located in the Raciąż County in the Płock Voivodeship in the Greater Poland Province of the Kingdom of Poland. It legally held a weekly market and an annual fair. A castle built on the bank of Wkra river during the period was completely destroyed during the Swedish invasion in the 17th century.

Following the Third Partition of Poland in 1795, the town was annexed by Prussia. In 1807 it passed to the short-lived Polish Duchy of Warsaw. After the duchy's dissolution in 1815, it passed to the Russian Partition of Poland. It was stripped of its town rights in 1869 by the Tsarist administration as punishment for the unsuccessful Polish January Uprising.

Around 1380 a parish was established in Radzanów that erected its first church, mentioned in 1439. The church was destroyed in around 1590, rebuilt in around 1598 and survived until the early 18th century. A second church was built in 1734. However, it was not until 1870 that the first brick-and-mortar church was erected in Radzanów.

Following the joint German-Soviet invasion of Poland, which started World War II in 1939, it was occupied by Germany until 1945.

=== Jewish community ===
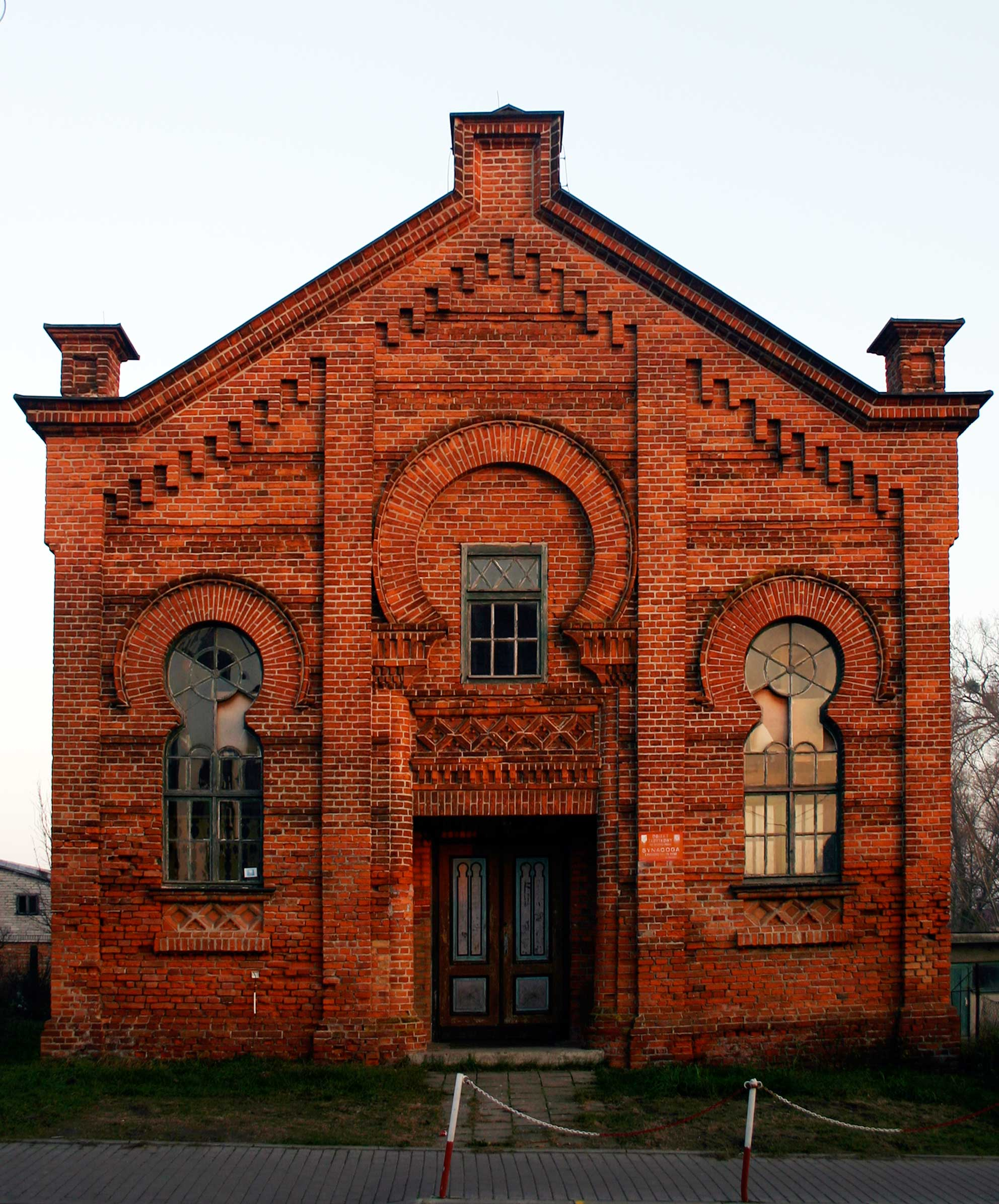
Radzanów Synagogue, built in the 19th century

Jews began to settle in Radzanów (Yiddish: ראדזאנוב) in considerable numbers around the second half of the 18th century as a result of a privilege issued by the town's owner Dorota Niszczycka, the Chamberlain of Płock from the Karczewski clan. She allocated to the Jewish Kehilla two streets and a plot of her land for a Jewish cemetery and a synagogue, as well as the right to trade in all goods and the production of alcohol. The cemetery, which was established in 1765 near the Wkra river (7,500 sq m in size), was levelled by the German occupiers in World War II and all the tombstones were removed. The synagogue houses the town's public library.

In 1857, there were 571 Jews out of the total population of 1,040 people. By 1865, Jews accounted for 45 percent of the town's inhabitants. In the second half of the 19th century the Kehilla built a brick synagogue designed by S. Kmita with Moorish-style motifs, in place of the original wooden one. The Jewish community (population 532 by 1900) was completely destroyed in the Holocaust, with about 200 of its members deported in January 1942 to the ghetto in Mława, and from there to Treblinka and Auschwitz death camps in November 1942. Today there are no Jews in Radzanów. The synagogue was entered into the national register of historic monuments in 1975 and repaired in 1986.

== Economy ==
Radzanów and its county (with Bieżuń and Żuromin nearby) is one of the largest producers of poultry and eggs in the Mazovia. A waste treatment plant in the town called "Bacutil" services the northern part of the province, while the social infrastructure includes a medical clinic, post office, cultural centre and public library, as well as a number of stores and service stations. The water-supply pipes cover all of the gmina. The Era GSM cell-phone tower was erected in 2001.
