= Krzymów, Masovian Voivodeship =

Krzymów
- Village
- Location within Poland
- Coordinates: 52°20′58″N 19°34′47″E
- Country: Poland
- Voivodeship: Masovian
- County: Gostynin
- Gmina: Szczawin Kościelny

Krzymów [ˈkʂɨmuf] is a village in the administrative district of Gmina Szczawin Kościelny, within Gostynin County, Masovian Voivodeship, in east-central Poland.
