= Niedrzwica Kościelna =

- Village
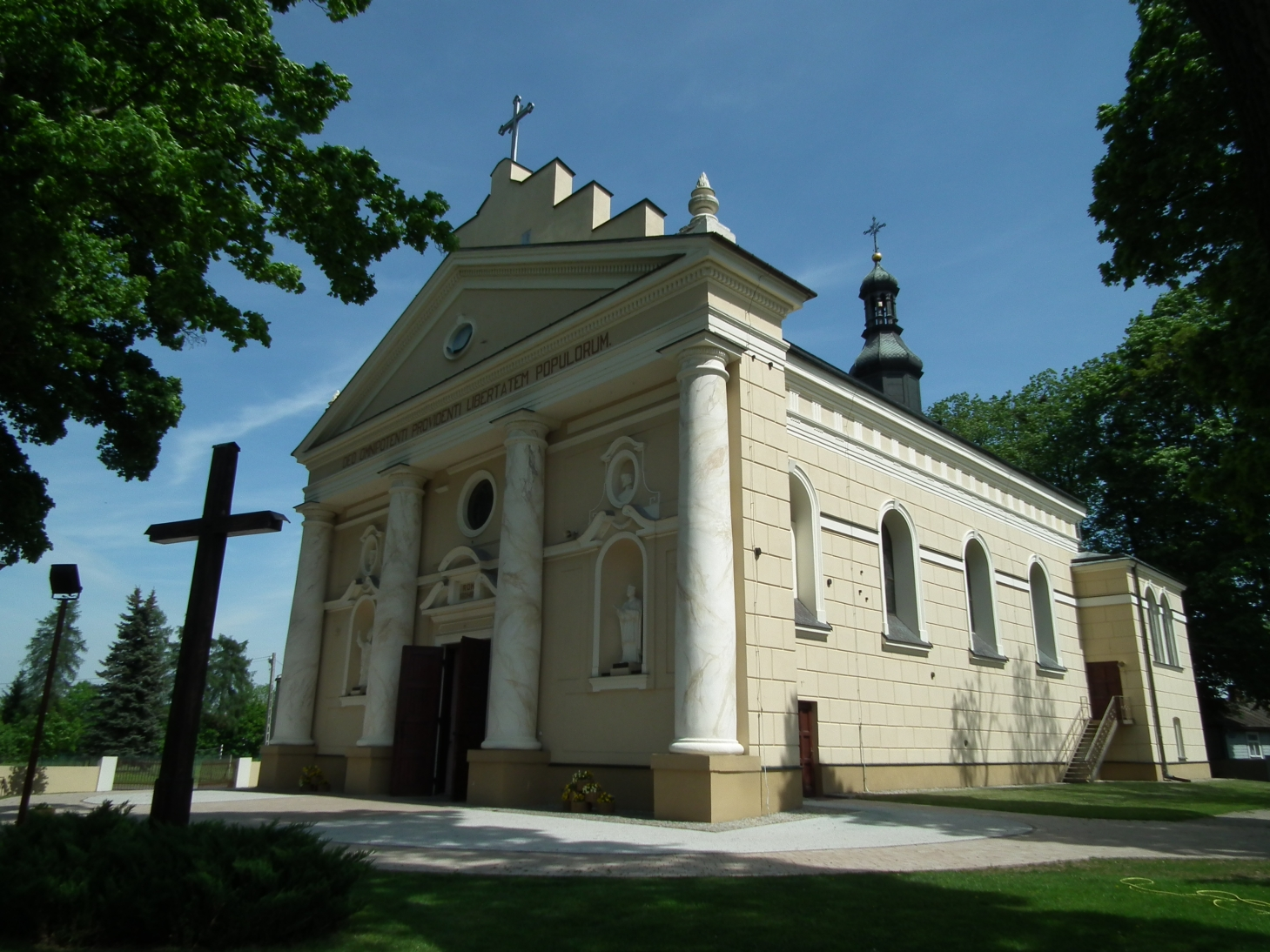
- Saint Bartholomew church in Niedrzwica Kościelna

- Location within Poland
- Coordinates: 51°5′N 22°22′E
- Country: Poland
- Voivodeship: Lublin
- County: Lublin
- Gmina: Niedrzwica Duża

Population
  - Total: 1,500
- Time zone: UTC+1 (CET)
  - Summer (DST): UTC+2 (CEST)

Niedrzwica Kościelna [ɲɛdʐˈvit͡sa kɔɕˈt͡ɕɛlna] is a village in the administrative district of Gmina Niedrzwica Duża, within Lublin County, Lublin Voivodeship, in eastern Poland.

== History ==
15 Polish citizens were murdered by Nazi Germany in the village during World War II.
