= Kościelna Wieś =

Kościelna Wieś may refer to the following places in Poland:

- Kościelna Wieś, Lower Silesian Voivodeship (south-west Poland)
- Kościelna Wieś, Kuyavian-Pomeranian Voivodeship (north-central Poland)
- Kościelna Wieś, Greater Poland Voivodeship (west-central Poland)
