= Gmina Radzanów, Mława County =

Gmina Radzanów Radzanów Commune
- Gmina
- Coat of arms
- Interactive map of Gmina Radzanów
- Coordinates (Radzanów): 52°56′31″N 20°5′30″E
- Country: Poland
- Voivodeship: Masovian
- County: Mława
- Seat: Radzanów

Area
  - Total: 98.7 km^{2} (38.1 sq mi)

Population (2013)
  - Total: 3,503
  - Density: 35.5/km^{2} (91.9/sq mi)
- Website: http://www.radzanow.com/

Gmina Radzanów is a rural gmina (administrative district) in Mława County, Masovian Voivodeship, in east-central Poland. Its seat is the village of Radzanów, which lies approximately 27 kilometres (17 mi) south-west of Mława and 102 km (63 mi) north-west of Warsaw.

The gmina covers an area of 98.7 square kilometres (38.1 sq mi), and as of 2006 its total population is 3,633 (3,503 in 2013).

== Villages ==
Gmina Radzanów contains the villages and settlements of Bębnówko, Bębnowo, Bieżany, Bojanowo, Bońkowo Kościelne, Bońkowo-Podleśne, Budy-Matusy, Cegielnia Ratowska, Gradzanowo Włościańskie, Gradzanowo Zbęskie, Gradzanowo Zbęskie-Kolonia, Józefowo, Luszewo, Marysinek, Radzanów, Ratowo, Ratowo-Leśniczówka, Trzciniec, Wróblewo, Zgliczyn Witowy, Zgliczyn-Glinki and Zieluminek.

== Neighbouring gminas ==
Gmina Radzanów is bordered by the gminas of Bieżuń, Raciąż, Siemiątkowo, Strzegowo and Szreńsk.
