= Ratowo, Masovian Voivodeship =

Ratowo
- Village
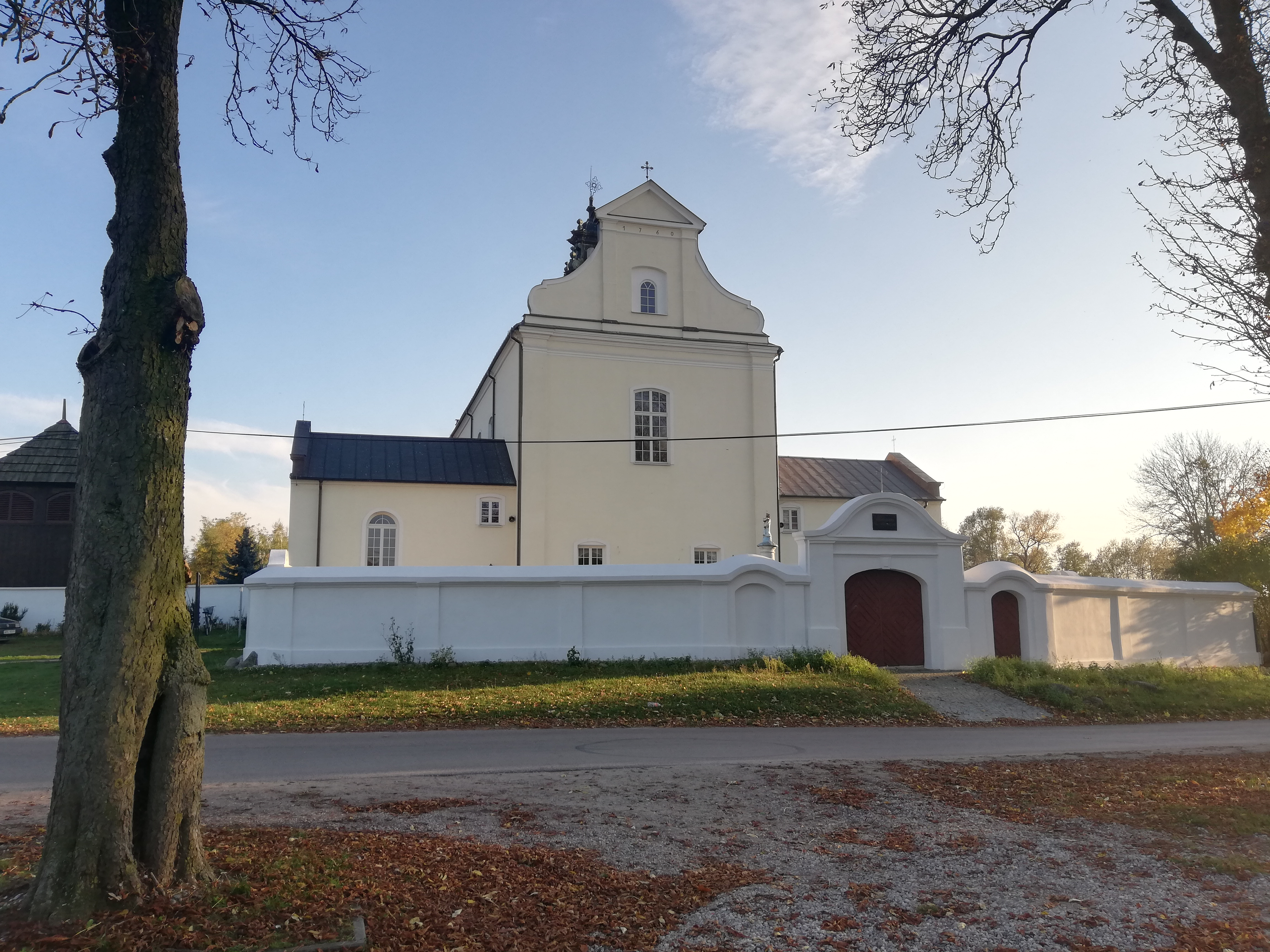
- Saint Anthony church in Ratowo

- Location within Poland
- Coordinates: 52°58′N 20°5′E
- Country: Poland
- Voivodeship: Masovian
- County: Mława
- Gmina: Radzanów

Population
  - Total: 380
- Time zone: UTC+1 (CET)
  - Summer (DST): UTC+2 (CEST)
- Vehicle registration: WML

Ratowo [raˈtɔvɔ] is a village in the administrative district of Gmina Radzanów, within Mława County, Masovian Voivodeship, in north-central Poland. It is situated on the Mławka River, a tributary of Wkra, in the historic region of Zawkrze.
