= Szreńsk =

- Village
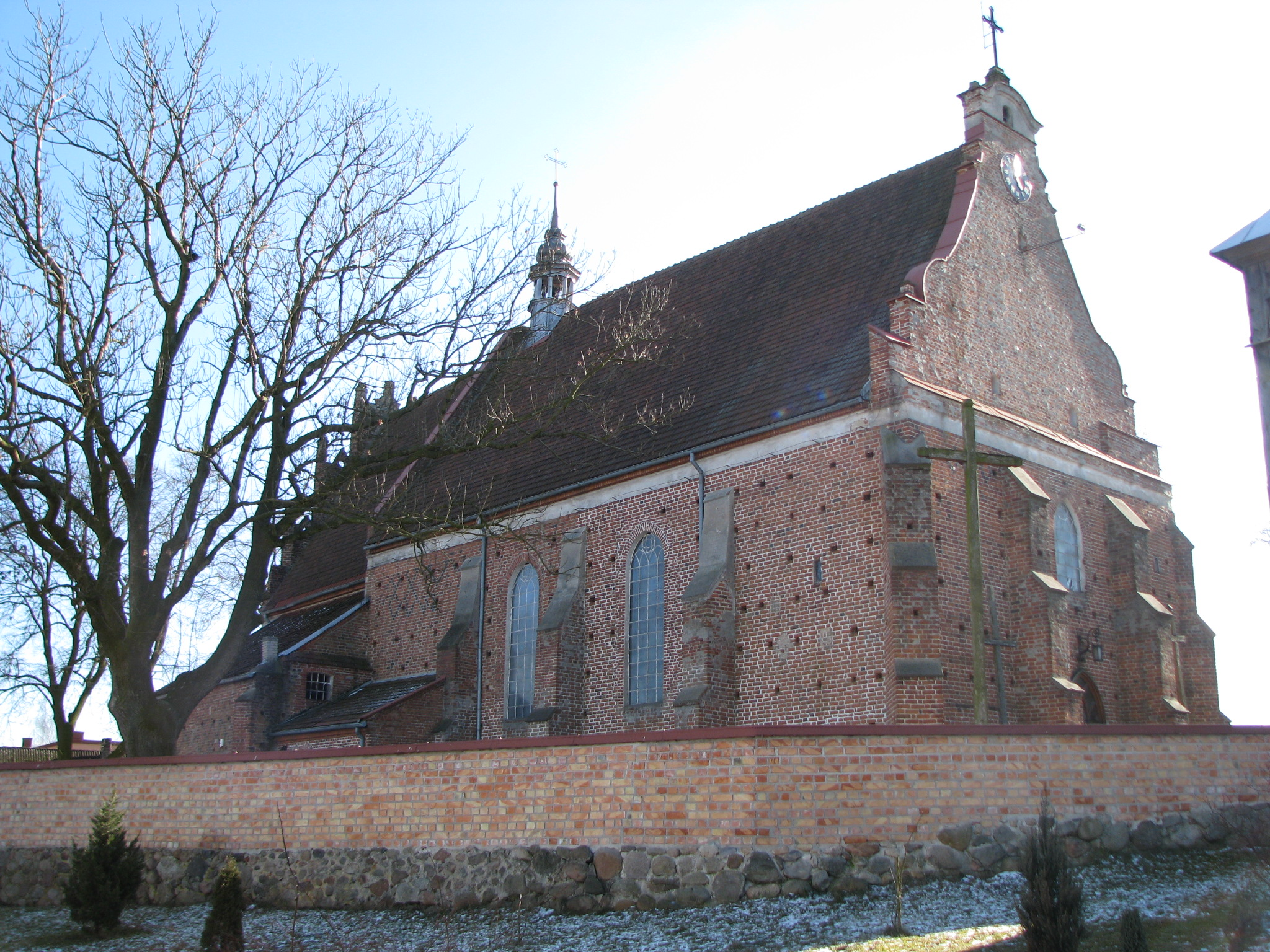
- Saint Adalbert church in Szreńsk

- Coat of arms

- Location within Poland
- Coordinates: 53°1′N 20°7′E
- Country: Poland
- Voivodeship: Masovian
- County: Mława
- Gmina: Szreńsk

Population
  - Total: 1,200
- Time zone: UTC+1 (CET)
  - Summer (DST): UTC+2 (CEST)
- Postal code: 06-550
- Vehicle registration: WML

Szreńsk [ʂrɛɲsk] is a village in Mława County, Masovian Voivodeship, in north-central Poland. It is the seat of the gmina (administrative district) called Gmina Szreńsk. It is located in the historic region of Zawkrze within the larger region of Mazovia.

== History ==
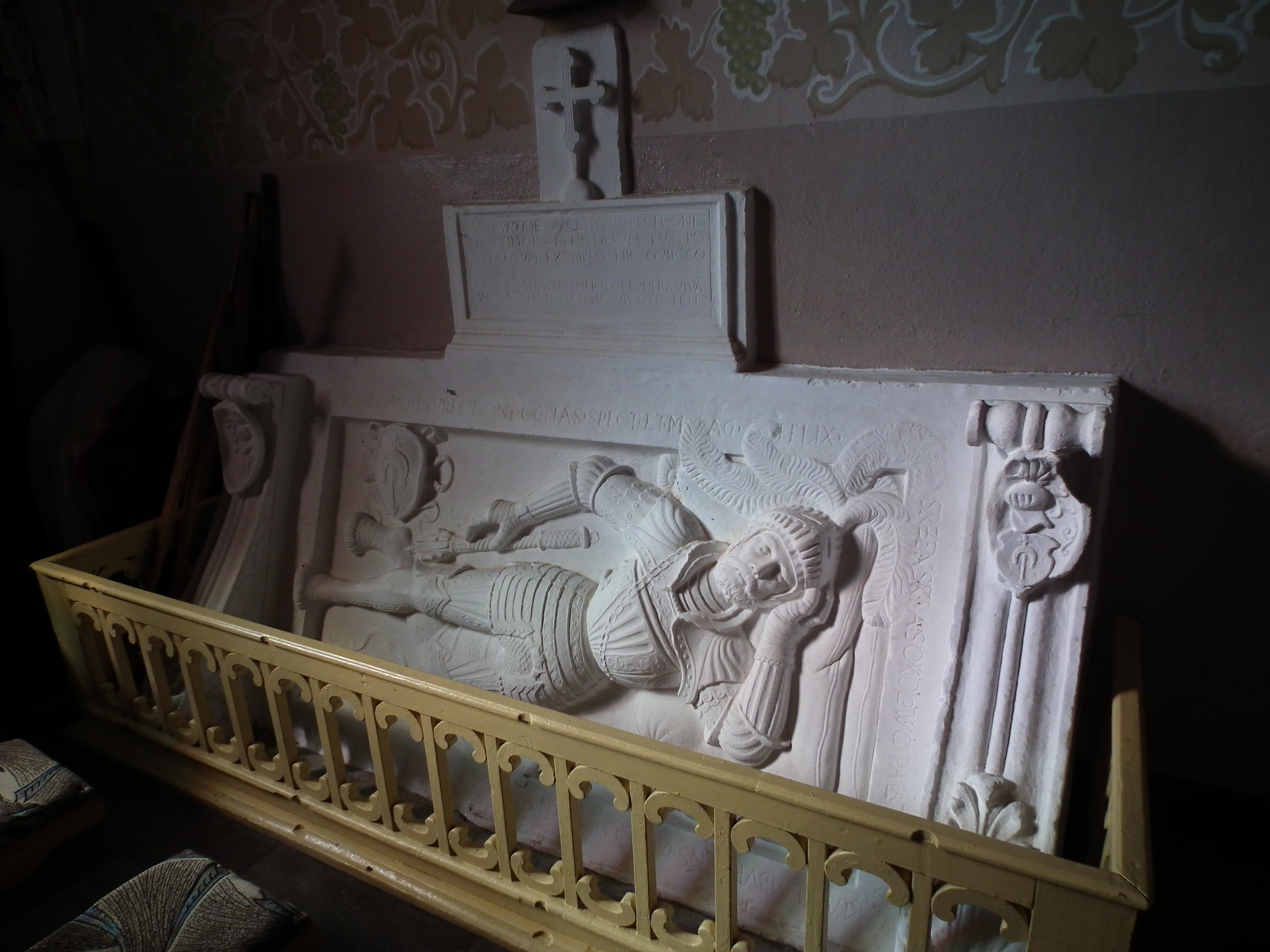
Renaissance tombstone of Feliks Szreński in the Saint Adalbert church

In 1383 Duke Siemowit IV granted Chełmno law town rights. It was a private town and seat of the Szreński noble family of Dołęga coat of arms, administratively located in the Płock Voivodeship in the Greater Poland Province of the Kingdom of Poland. Feliks Szreński, voivode of Płock, built a castle at the site of the old stronghold. The 1st Polish National Cavalry Brigade was stationed in the town.

Following the German-Soviet invasion of Poland, which started World War II in September 1939, Szreńsk was occupied by Germany until 1945. The Polish resistance was active in the area. On 9 September 1941, the Peasant Battalions attacked a German jail in Szreńsk.

== Notable people ==
- Martin Rosenberg (1890–1942), musician, victim of the Holocaust.
