= Gmina Bargłów Kościelny =

Gmina Bargłów Kościelny Bargłów Kościelny Commune
- Gmina
- Flag Coat of arms

- Gmina Bargłów Kościelny within the Augustów County
- Coordinates (Bargłów Kościelny): 53°46′N 22°49′E
- Country: Poland
- Voivodeship: Podlaskie
- County: Augustów
- Seat: Bargłów Kościelny

Area
  - Total: 187.57 km^{2} (72.42 sq mi)

Population (2019-06-30)
  - Total: 5,545
  - Density: 29.56/km^{2} (76.57/sq mi)
- Website: http://www.barglow.dt.pl/2/

Gmina Bargłów Kościelny is a rural gmina (administrative district) in Augustów County, Podlaskie Voivodeship, in north-eastern Poland. Its seat is the village of Bargłów Kościelny, which lies approximately 14 kilometres (9 mi) south-west of Augustów and 76 km (47 mi) north of the regional capital Białystok.

The gmina covers an area of 187.57 square kilometres (72.4 sq mi), and as of 2019 its total population is 5,545.

== Villages ==
Gmina Bargłów Kościelny contains the villages and settlements of Bargłów Dworny, Bargłów Kościelny, Bargłówka, Barszcze, Brzozówka, Bułkowizna, Dręstwo, Górskie, Judziki, Komorniki, Kresy, Kroszewo, Kroszówka, Kukowo, Łabętnik, Lipowo, Nowa Kamionka, Nowiny Bargłowskie, Pieńki, Pomiany, Popowo, Pruska, Reszki, Rumiejki, Solistówka, Sosnowo, Stara Kamionka, Stare Nowiny, Stare Tajno, Tajenko, Tajno Łanowe, Tajno Podjeziorne, Wólka Karwowska and Źrobki.

== Neighbouring gminas ==
Gmina Bargłów Kościelny is bordered by the gminas of Augustów, Goniądz, Kalinowo, Rajgród and Sztabin.
