= Bojanowo, Masovian Voivodeship =

Bojanowo
- Village
- Location within Poland
- Coordinates: 52°55′N 20°5′E
- Country: Poland
- Voivodeship: Masovian
- County: Mława
- Gmina: Radzanów

Bojanowo [bɔjaˈnɔvɔ] is a village in the administrative district of Gmina Radzanów, within Mława County, Masovian Voivodeship, in east-central Poland.
