= Gmina Szczawin Kościelny =

Gmina Szczawin Kościelny Szczawin Kościelny Commune
- Gmina
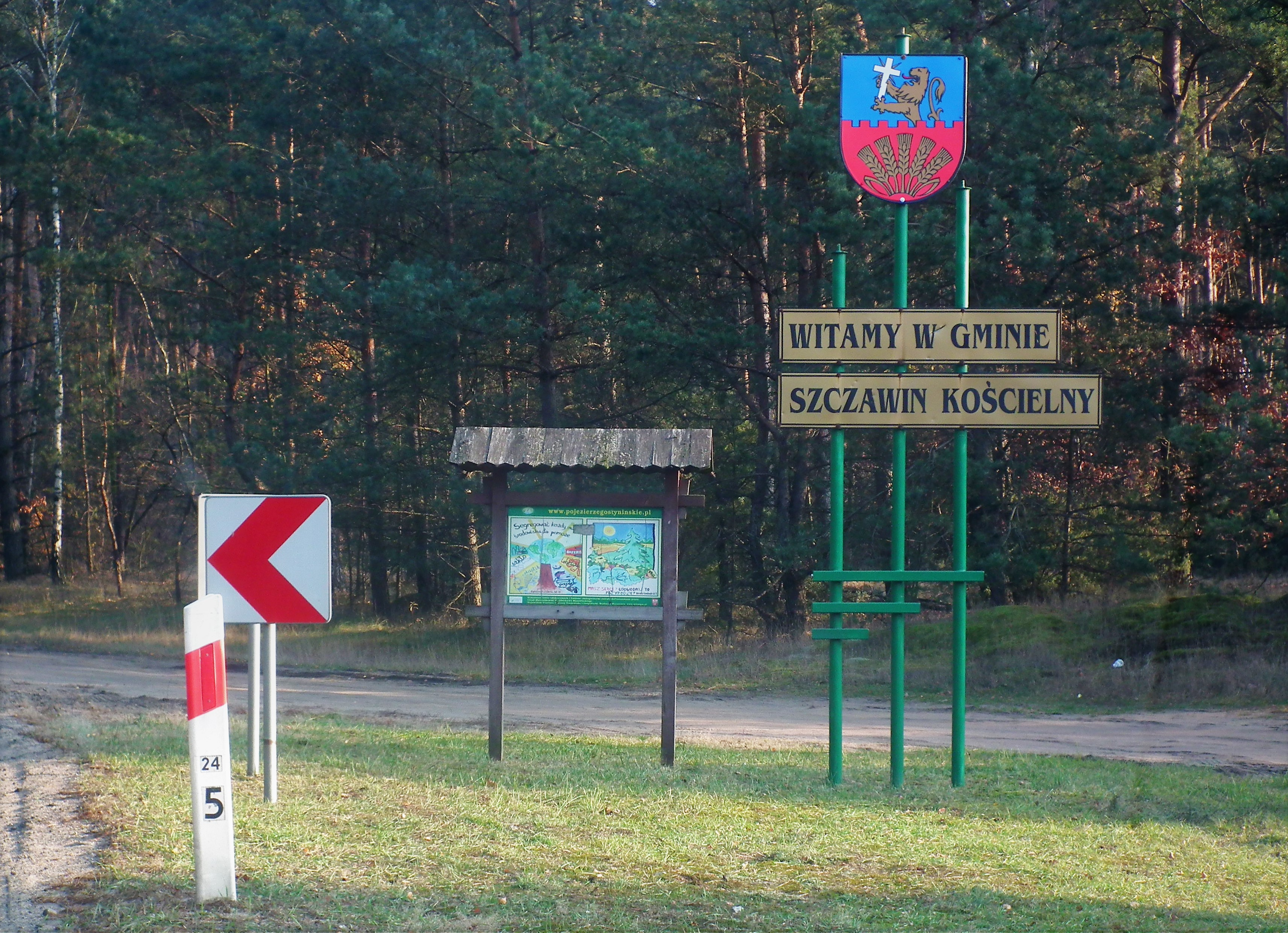

- Flag Coat of arms

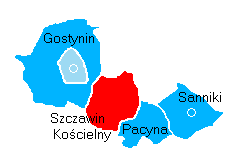
- Location within Gostynin County
- Coordinates (Szczawin Kościelny): 52°22′N 19°37′E
- Country: Poland
- Voivodeship: Masovian
- County: Gostynin
- Seat: Szczawin Kościelny

Area
  - Total: 127.14 km^{2} (49.09 sq mi)

Population (2006)
  - Total: 5,181
  - Density: 40.75/km^{2} (105.5/sq mi)
- Time zone: UTC+1 (CET)
  - Summer (DST): UTC+2 (CEST)
- Vehicle registration: WGS
- Website: http://www.szczawin.pl

Gmina Szczawin Kościelny is a rural gmina (administrative district) in Gostynin County, Masovian Voivodeship, in central Poland. Its seat is the village of Szczawin Kościelny, which lies approximately 12 kilometres (7 mi) south-east of Gostynin and 96 km (60 mi) west of Warsaw.

The gmina covers an area of 127.14 square kilometres (49.1 sq mi), and as of 2022 its total population is 4,830.

== Villages ==
Gmina Szczawin Kościelny contains the villages and settlements of Adamów, Annopol, Białka, Budki Suserskie, Budy Kaleńskie, Dobrów, Gołas, Gorzewo-Kolonia, Helenów, Helenów Słupski, Helenów Trębski, Holendry Dobrowskie, Janki, Jesionka, Józefków, Kaleń, Kamieniec, Krzymów, Kunki, Lubieniek, Mellerów, Misiadla, Modrzew, Mościska, Osowia, Pieryszew, Przychód, Reszki, Sewerynów, Słup, Smolenta, Staw, Stefanów Suserski, Suserz, Swoboda, Szczawin Borowy-Kolonia, Szczawin Borowy-Wieś, Szczawin Kościelny, Szczawinek, Teodorów, Trębki, Tuliska, Waliszew, Witoldów, Wola Trębska and Wola Trębska-Parcel.

== Neighbouring gminas ==
Gmina Szczawin Kościelny is bordered by the gminas of Gąbin, Gostynin, Łąck, Oporów, Pacyna and Strzelce.
