= Bargłów Kościelny =

- Village
- Location within Poland
- Coordinates: 53°46′N 22°49′E
- Country: Poland
- Voivodeship: Podlaskie
- County: Augustów
- Gmina: Bargłów Kościelny

Bargłów Kościelny ([ˈbarɡwuf kɔɕˈt͡ɕɛlnɨ]; Lithuanian: Barglavas) is a village in Augustów County, Podlaskie Voivodeship, in north-eastern Poland. It is the seat of the gmina (administrative district) called Gmina Bargłów Kościelny.

== Sources ==
- VLKK (2002). "Atvirkštinis lietuvių kalboje vartojamų tradicinių Lenkijos vietovardžių formų sąrašas" (PDF). VLKK (in Lithuanian). Archived from the original (PDF) on 2012-02-14.
