= Marysinek, Gmina Radzanów =

Marysinek
- Settlement
- Location within Poland
- Coordinates: 52°56′21″N 20°11′53″E
- Country: Poland
- Voivodeship: Masovian
- County: Mława
- Gmina: Radzanów

Marysinek [marɨˈɕinɛk] is a settlement in the administrative district of Gmina Radzanów, within Mława County, Masovian Voivodeship, in east-central Poland.
