= Niedrzwica Kościelna-Kolonia =

- Village
- Location within Poland
- Coordinates: 51°04′29″N 22°23′49″E
- Country: Poland
- Voivodeship: Lublin
- County: Lublin
- Gmina: Niedrzwica Duża

Niedrzwica Kościelna-Kolonia [ɲɛdʐˈvit͡sa kɔɕˈt͡ɕɛlna kɔˈlɔɲa] is a village in the administrative district of Gmina Niedrzwica Duża, within Lublin County, Lublin Voivodeship, in eastern Poland.
