= Gołas =

- Village
- Location within Poland
- Coordinates: 52°20′N 19°39′E
- Country: Poland
- Voivodeship: Masovian
- County: Gostynin
- Gmina: Szczawin Kościelny
- Population: 100

Gołas [ˈɡɔwas] is a village in the administrative district of Gmina Szczawin Kościelny, within Gostynin County, Masovian Voivodeship, in east-central Poland.
