= Golaš =

Mountain in Serbia

Highest point
- Elevation: 1,389 m (4,557 ft)
- Coordinates: 43°12′13″N 22°14′45″E

Geography
- Location: Southern Serbia
- Parent range: Balkan Mountains

Golaš is a mountain in southern Serbia, near the town of Bela Palanka. It has an elevation of 1,389 metres (4,557 ft) above sea level.

== See also ==
- List of mountains in Serbia
