= First Battle of Przasnysz =

Battle of the First World War on the Eastern Front (18 February to 26 March 1915)

Coordinates: 52.130°N 20.052°E

1st Battle of Przasnysz
- Part of the Eastern Front during World War I
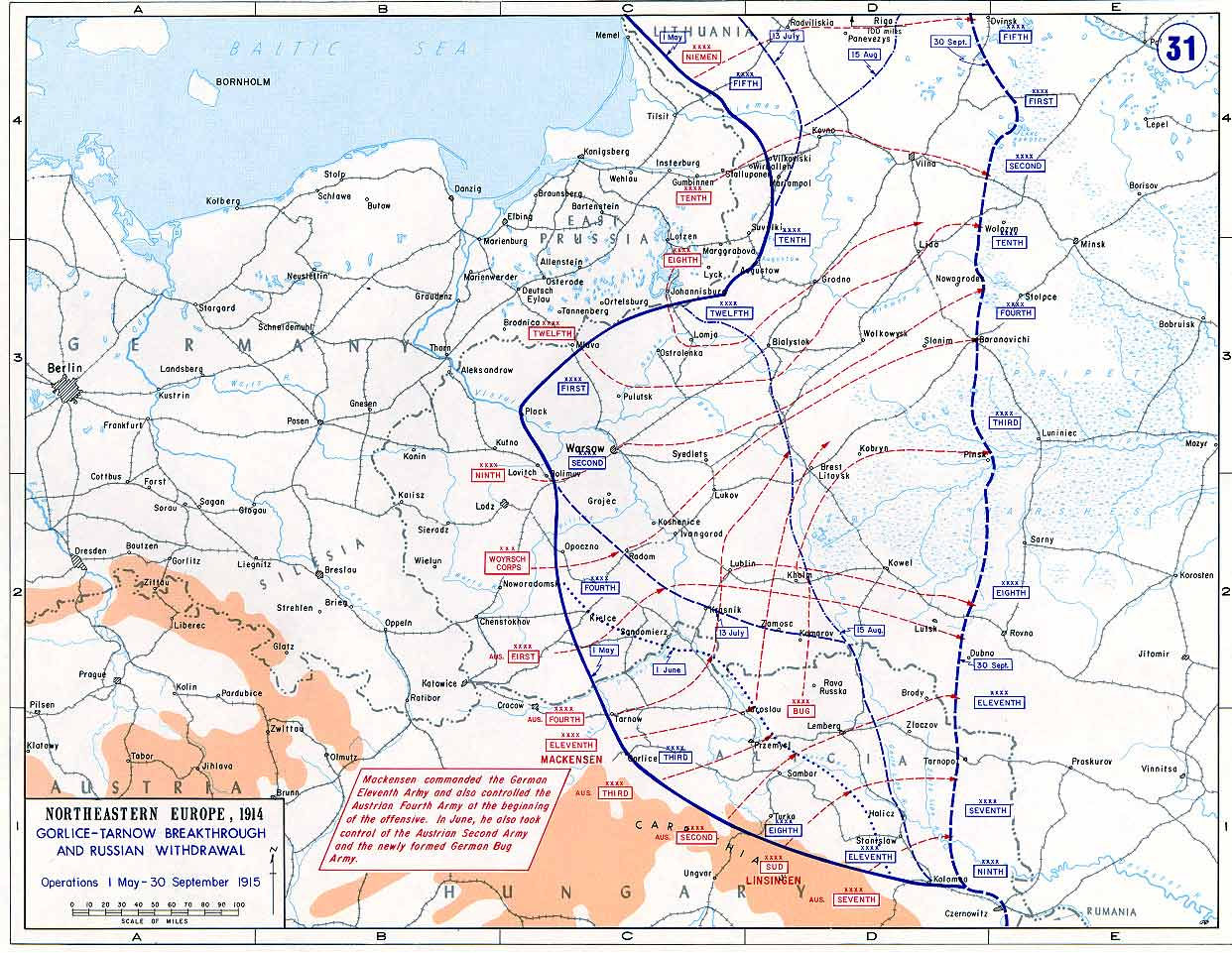
- Eastern Front, 1915.
Date	February 7–28, 1915
Location	Near Przasnysz, Congress Poland, Russian Empire (present-day Poland)
Result	Russian victory: German plans to encircle Russians in Poland fail
Territorial changes	Germans retreat from the northern part of the Congress Poland

Belligerents
German Empire	Russian Empire

Commanders and leaders
(German Empire) Paul von Hindenburg (German Empire) Max von Gallwitz	Nikolai Ruzsky; Alexander Litvinov; Pavel Plehve; Samad bey Mehmandarov

Units involved
(German Empire) Armee-Gruppe Gallwitz (German Empire) 8th Army	1st Army; 12th Army

Strength
225,000 men 350 machine guns 750 guns	471,901 men 636 machine guns 966 guns

The First Battle of Przasnysz was fought between the Imperial German Army and the Imperial Russian troops. It took place between 7 and 28 February 1915, on the Eastern Front during World War I.

== Background ==
At a time when German troops were gathering in the north of East Prussia to strike at the Russian 10th Army, the Russian command planned to launch an offensive within Germany from the Narew River by the forces of the 1st and newly formed 12th Armies. The concentration of the 1st Guards and 4th Siberian Army Corps was to be covered by the cavalry of the 1st Army from the northern bank of the Narew (4th Don Cossack, 4th, 6th and 15th cavalry divisions, 1st and 4th Cavalry Brigades). During 2–4, February 1915, the Russian cavalry had clashes with parts of the Landsturm, after which it was concluded that the enemy forces were weak in the future main direction of attack.

At this time, the command of the German 9th Army, having received the task of ensuring an offensive in Mazury from the southern flank (the arrival of new Russian corps became known), reinforced the Graudenz and Thorn corps with a group of artillery general Fritz von Scholz and the 1st Guards Reserve Division. On 10 February, an army group of artillery general Max von Gallwitz (93 battalions, 64 squadrons) was formed from these troops, which received from the Supreme Commander of All German Forces in the East, Field Marshal Paul von Hindenburg, the task of going on the offensive to pin down Russian forces on the southern border of East Prussia. On 11 February, Hindenburg ordered the commander of the 8th Army, Otto von Below, to allocate at least a corps for active operations on Shchuchyn and Grajewo. The detachment included the 1st Landwehr Division, the 5th Guards Infantry and the 6th Reserve Division.

On the same day, 11 February, the chief of the staff of the North-Western Front, Nikolai Ruzsky, issued a directive on the transition to the offensive by the forces of the 10th and 12th Armies. However, the 10th Army was unable to advance, as it hastily retreated from the borders of East Prussia, and for the 12th Army, the time for going on the offensive was linked to the time of the full concentration of its corps.

== The battle ==
On 12 February, the right flank of the Gallwitz's army group went on the offensive, crossing the Skrwa Prawa river, 600 Russian prisoners were captured. During the fighting, parts of the Russian 4th Siberian and 27th Army Corps were discovered near Różan and Przasnysz. Considering it necessary to further increase pressure on Łomża and Osowiec, Hindenburg transferred the XX Army Corps with the 41st Infantry Division from the Gallwitz group to the 8th Army, setting the task of capturing Lomza and Osowiec, and in return transferred to Mlava I Reserve Corps under the command of General Lieutenant Curt von Morgen (1st under Sigismund von Förster and 36th Reserve Divisions under Konrad Kurt Kruge).

On 15 February, Morgen's corps landed in Mlawa and moved towards Ciechanów. Pressure was created on the left flank of the Russian grouping on the Narew. On 16 February, Scholz's group, reinforced by the 11th Landwehr Division, drove the Russian troops (Caucasian Rifle Brigade) out of Kolno. Hindenburg hurried Otto von Below with the preparation of a decisive offensive against the fortresses along the rivers Bobr and Narew. On 17 February, the Scholz group (41st Infantry, 3rd Reserve, 1st and 11th Landwehr Divisions, 5th Infantry Brigade) drove the Russian troops of the 10th Army across the Skroda River.

By the evening of 16 February, Russian troops occupied the line from Osowiec to Slupno. On 17 February, a meeting was held at the Staff of the Russian Supreme Commander, at which Nikolai Ruzsky proposed to transfer the maximum number of troops to Mlava, deploying two armies here - the 1st and 12th, and using the 2nd and 5th Armies as a reserve and even withdraw to reduce the front to Novogeorgievsk and Warsaw. The commander-in-chief of the armies of the Southwestern Front, General of Artillery Nikolai Ivanov, and his chief of staff, General of Infantry Mikhail Alekseyev, spoke out against such a withdrawal, which exposed the flank of neighbouring armies during the period of the Austro-Hungarian offensive in the Carpathians. The Supreme Commander, Grand Duke Nikolai Nikolayevich, forbade a retreat from the positions on Bzura, Rawka and Pilica, but approved the plan to attack Mlava with the forces of two armies. The start of the offensive was scheduled for 20 February.

On 17 February, the Russian 76th and 77th Infantry Divisions launched an offensive against Drobin. The attacks were so strong and swift that the Russian chains managed to break through to the battery of the German 1st Guards Reserve Field Artillery Regiment. But with a counterattack by the Guards Reserve Rifle Battalion of the 64th Reserve Infantry Regiment and the Life Hussar Brigade, the Germans managed to push the Russian infantry back to its original position and capture 6 officers and 2,500 soldiers, 6 machine guns and 2 guns. The casualties of the 1st Guards Reserve Division and the Life Hussar Brigade amounted to 85 killed, 5 prisoners, 216 wounded.

On 18 February, the German troops also managed to repel the attacks of the arriving 19th Army Corps. The chief of staff of the Supreme Commander of All German Forces in the East, Lieutenant-General Erich Ludendorff, hurried Gallwitz and asked why the I Reserve Corps had not been brought into battle. But Gallwitz decided to instruct these troops to advance on Ciechanów and further south, bypassing Przasnysz. On February 19, the corps of Morgen and the Wernitzy division were ordered to bypass Przasnysz from the east and west, to tie up units of the Russian 1st Turkestan Army Corps in battle and, with the forces of two reserve divisions, go to their rear.

During 18 February, the Russian Guards Corps arrived in the Grajewo direction and gradually entered into battle with the German Scholz group.

On the morning of 19 February, the commander of the Guards Corps, General of the Cavalry Vladimir Bezobrazov, launched an offensive against the villages of Radziłów, Stawiski and Kolno. The Osowiec garrison was defending on the distant approaches to the fortress. Commandant Lieutenant General K. Shulman asked to send at least a few battalions. The 3rd Caucasian Army Corps was sent to the fortress, but the first battalions of the 84th Shirvan Infantry Regiment arrived at the fortress only in the evening.

At this time, units of the 20th Army Corps ousted the Russian troops of the right flank of the 12th Army. The offensive of the 4th Siberian Army Corps failed. On 20 February, German artillery began shelling Osowiec. Below hoped that the Scholz's group would be able to bypass the Russians along the left bank of the Bobr river and force them to leave Lomza and Osowiec. But in the threatened direction, the commander of the Russian 12th Army, General of the Cavalry Paul von Plehwe, brought the Guards Corps into battle. For operations against Osowiec, a group of infantry general Rudolf von Freudenberg (the 11th Landwehr Division, the 5th Infantry and 6th Reserve Brigades) was now created in the German 8th Army, and all heavy artillery was transferred to it. Gustaf von Dickhuth-Harrach's corps managed to repulse the attacks of the Russian 19th and 2nd Siberian Army Corps again during the day, the number of prisoners taken from the beginning of the offensive reached 6,800 men. The Wernitz's division struck at the Turkestan Army Corps and took Kitki. The newly arrived regiments of the 1st Siberian Army Corps were thrown into the battle.

On 21 February, Plehwe ordered the 2nd Siberian Army Corps to be transferred to Ostrołęka, from where, from 22 February, an offensive would be launched to strike the flank of the Germans, who had broken through between Przasnysz and the Orzyca River.

On 22 February, von Gallwitz continued the offensive. On the right flank, Plantier's detachment managed to break through to Slupno. The rest of the formations defended on the positions reached. Apart from the cavalry, the 19th and 27th Army Corps (17th, 38th, 76th and 77th Infantry Divisions and a brigade of the 2nd Infantry Division from Novogeorgievsk) acted against them. The divisions of Brougel and Wernitz continued to push the Russian 1st Turkestan Army Corps. Morgen's corps advanced slightly towards the city of Przasnysz. Gallwitz ordered Morgen not to storm Przasnysz, which was supposed to be occupied by the approaching 9th Landwehr Brigade, but to connect south of the city with the Wernitz division and then strike at the rear of the 1st Turkestan Army Corps.

The commander of the Russian 12th Army, cavalry general P. Plehve, ordered the Guards Corps to go on the offensive from February 23, push back the German advancing on Łomża, defeat him, easing the position of the Osowiec fortress and at the same time defending a section of the Bobr and Narew Rivers; the group of General Savvich was entrusted with the defense of the approaches to Ostrołęka; 2nd Siberian Army Corps was to release Przasnysz. The army thus had to advance on the flanks in divergent directions.

By this time, the army had (only combat troops) 165,633 infantry, 12,685 cavalry, 359 machine guns, 812 guns and 6 aircraft. These forces also outnumbered F. von Scholz's group from the German 8th Army in manpower, machine guns and artillery, but the two corps had not yet fully arrived at the army.

During February 23, Scholz's German group advanced against the Russian Guard, but all attacks were repulsed. On the front of the Russian 1st Army, the corps of C. von Morgen continued to bypass Przasnysz, and the 70th Reserve Brigade occupied Wola Wierzbowska, fighting with units of the 38th Infantry Division sent here. The ring around Przasnysz closed; The 11th Siberian Rifle Division advanced on the positions of the Wernitz division, but the Germans managed to capture Działyń - 3 km west of Przasnysz. The advance of the 11th Siberian Division was stopped. Parts of the 1st and 2nd Siberian Rifle Divisions approaching from the south approached Bogdanów and Elżbietów, Gielniów. The German 1st Reserve Brigade broke into the southern outskirts of Przasnysz, where they captured 2,000 prisoners, 3 machine guns and 3 guns. C. von Morgen sent an offer to the garrison to surrender in order to avoid further bloodshed, but the commander of the 250th Baltic Infantry Regiment, Colonel A. Barybin, replied that he did not have the authority to negotiate the surrender. During the night and morning of February 24, Przasnysz was taken by storm by the 1st Reserve Division under Generalleutnant Sigismund von Förster. The Germans captured 10,000 prisoners (of which 60 officers), a banner, 14 machine guns and 36 guns, an armoured car. The casualties of the attackers in 5 days amounted to 110 killed, 123 missing and 474 wounded.

During the day of February 24, the 11th Siberian Rifle and 38th Infantry Divisions tried to break into Przasnysz. But there was little progress. Cavalry General Litvinov reprimanded corps commanders in the evening: "The results of today's offensive are negligible, I order Generals Pleshkov and Scheidemann to continue the attack at dawn on February 12, regardless of the fatigue of the troops. The Germans are even more tired, I demand that tomorrow, February 12, the 1st Siberian Army Corps occupies Przasnysz, and the 1st Turkestan - the Chojnowo region; I ask General Plehve about the same offensive of the 2nd Siberian Army Corps. The rest of the troops of the army steadfastly hold their position".

In the 12th Army, during February 24, the Germans bypassed Grudusk and Pultusk from the north. Success accompanied only the 4th Siberian Rifle Division, which crossed the Orzyca River. At 21 o'clock, the general from the cavalry P. Plehve gave the order to the commander of the 1st Siberian Army Corps, the general A. Sychevsky: "blows to the enemy with superior forces, so that he could not come to his senses and would not have time to gather his forces, and in the event of his retreat, pursue him resolutely and mercilessly".

On February 25, von Gallwitz, ordered the group of C. von Morgen ordered his troops to defend themselves. However, in the morning, communication with Morgen and Wernitz was interrupted. After artillery preparation, the regiments of the 4th and 5th Siberian Rifle Divisions went on the offensive. The 1st and 2nd Siberian Rifle Divisions advanced towards Przasnysz from the south. Parts of the 1st Turkestan Army Corps and the 38th Infantry Division in a fierce battle with the Wernitz division.

The Commander of the North-Western Front, Infantry General N. Ruzsky, did not lose hope that the Germans would be surrounded in Przasnysz. He transferred 1st Siberian and 1st Turkestan Army Corps to the operational subordination of the commander of the 12th Army, General of the Cavalry P. Plehve. Plehve himself, seeking to use the first successes on February 26, again ordered the infantry general A. Sychevsky "to beat the enemy, to pursue him in the most persistent and merciless way, if possible - not to release him, but to take or destroy him, in general to show extreme energy".

C. von Morgen received the task of advancing against Russian attacks. But the Germans at Przasnysz could not go on the offensive. On the night of February 26, the 1st Siberian Army Corps began to advance. The withdrawal of the Germans began to take on a chaotic character after the 2nd Turkestan Rifle Brigade and the 2nd Brigade of the 38th Infantry Division went to the rear of the Germans and captured 2 officers, 400 soldiers and 4 machine guns.

From the east, the Germans were pushed to Przasnysz by the 4th and 5th Siberian Rifle Divisions. The counterattack of the German 6th Infantry Brigade was not successful, the 9th Landwehr Brigade lost 396 men killed and missing and 1,907 wounded. To pursue the retreating Germans, the commander of the 1st Army pushed forward the 15th Cavalry Division. Before nightfall, she captured 4 guns and over 200 prisoners from the 21st Reserve Infantry Regiment and the 2nd Reserve Jaeger Battalion.

The offensive of the corps of the 1st Army continued, although the front command was dissatisfied with its pace. The chief of staff of the army tried to explain to the quartermaster general of the staff of the armies of the front, Major General Bonch-Bruyevich: "and if some episodes are not played out immediately in the sense we want, this does not give us the right to think that there is no control over the operation. When it is over, you can document that the events on our right flank were in our hands every minute". It was primarily about the Turkestan Corps, which could not break through to Przasnysz from the west. All day long, his attacks were repelled and even driven back by his units of the regiment of the Wernitz division.

Attempts by the 12th Army to organize a deep detour and encirclement of the German troops at Przasnysz failed. To complete the defeat of the Morgen's group, the 2nd Siberian Army Corps was transferred to the 1st Army. At about 11 pm on February 26, two regiments of the 2nd Siberian Rifle Division broke into the southern outskirts of Przasnysz, but then were driven back by a counterattack at night. The battle resumed on February 27, during the day the two Siberian and Turkestan corps pressed the Germans. Von Gallwitz had to decide on the retreat. In a telephone conversation with him, E. Ludendorff and the first quartermaster of the Staff of the Supreme Commander of All German Forces in the East, Colonel Max Hoffmann, expressed their conviction that the Russian offensive was undertaken not only to recapture Przasnysz, but for a new invasion of Germany from Mlawa, and therefore we must conserve our strength and strengthen ourselves closer to the border. During February 27–28, Morgen's group was withdrawn.

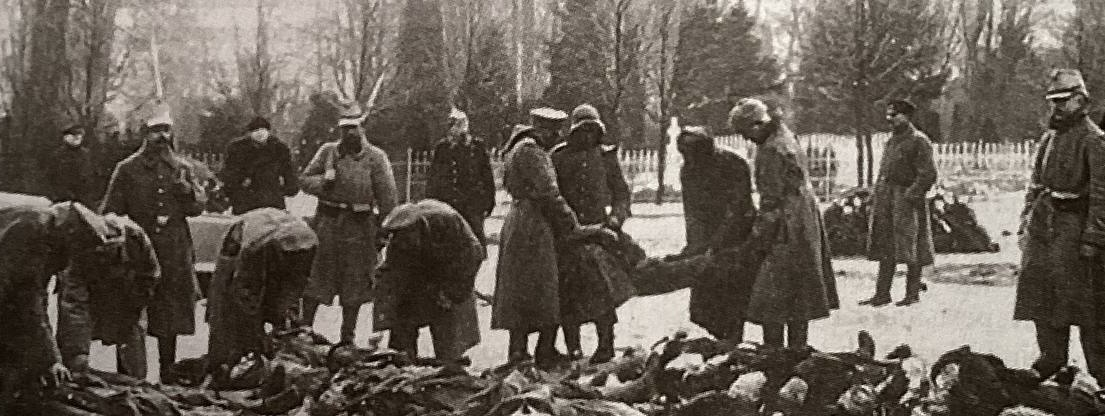
Burials of German soldiers in Memel who died at Prasnys

But the withdrawal of German troops from Przasnysz was unorganized, they had to fight off the pursuing Russian troops. On February 27, the regiments of the 1st Siberian Rifle Division broke the resistance of the German barriers defending the barracks, and entered the city at 7 pm to the sound of bells. The 1st Turkestan Army Corps failed at Działyń, and the 38th Infantry Division, thrown back by German reserves, could not break through. But 1st and 2nd Siberian Army Corps occupied Jednorożec and the northern environs of Przasnysz by the end of the day. During the counter-offensive, from 63 officers and 6,776 to 14,000 German soldiers were captured, 12 guns, 29 machine guns, 52 machine gun barrels and an aircraft that crashed were captured.

== See also ==
- Battle of Łomża
- 2nd Battle of Przasnysz

== Sources ==
- Олейников, Алексей (2016). Россия-щит Антанты. С предисловием Николая Старикова. St. Petersburg: Питер. ISBN 978-5-496-01795-4.
- Oleynikov, А. (2023). Германский натиск на Восток 1915 [The German push to the East 1915] (in Russian). ISBN 978-5-4484-4327-5.
