= Battle of Łomża =

Part of the First World War (1915)

- Part of the Eastern Front during World War I
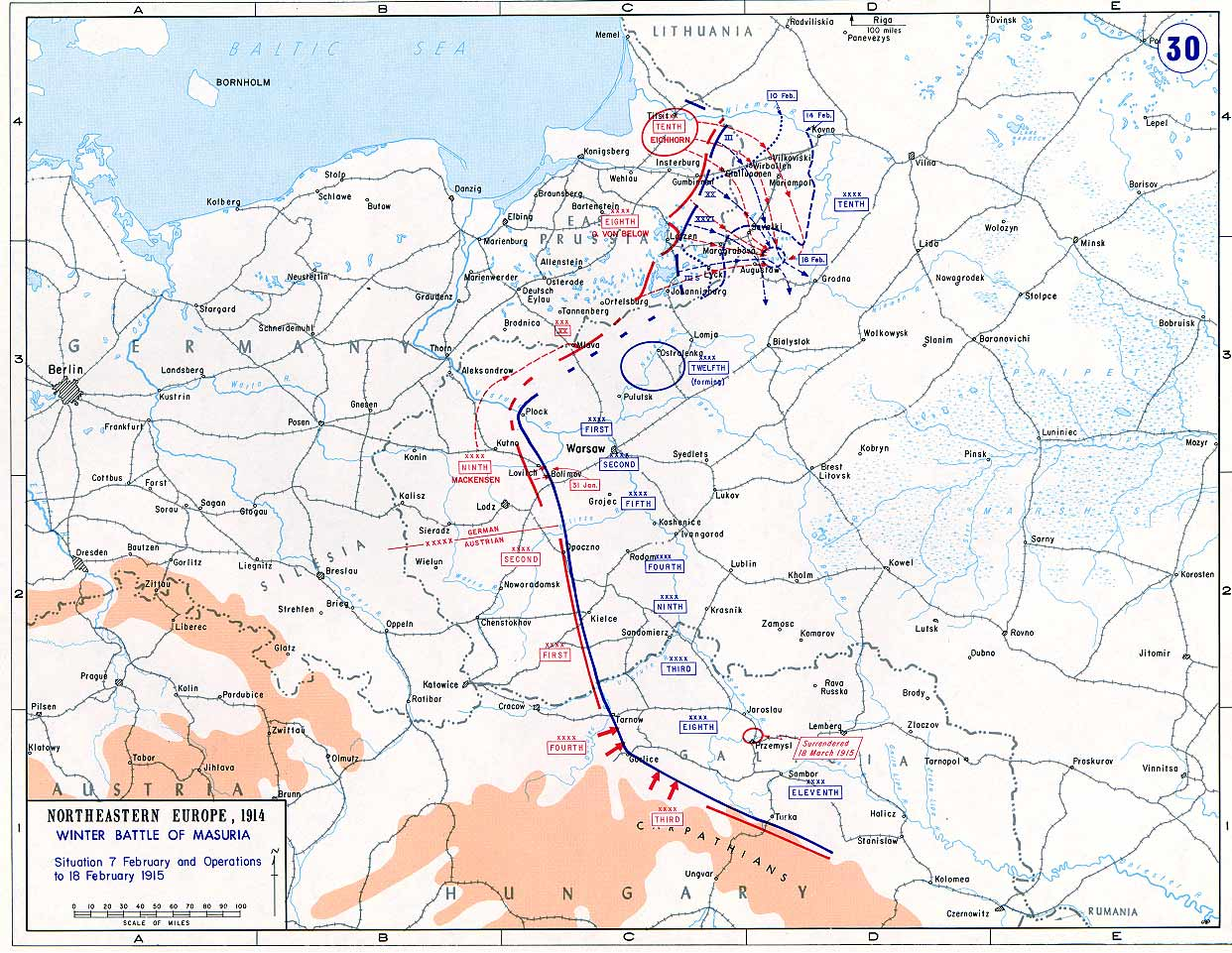
- Eastern Front, March 1 - April 28, 1915
Date	March, 1 – April 28, 1915
Location	Northern Congress Poland, Russian Empire (present-day Poland and Lithuania)
Result	Russian victory
Territorial changes	Germans evacuate the Neman region and Grodno; Russian troops occupy Memel and Tauragė

Belligerents
German Empire	Russian Empire

Commanders and leaders
(German Empire) Paul von Hindenburg (German Empire) Erich Ludendorff (German Empire) Max Hoffmann (German Empire) Max von Gallwitz	Nikolai Ruzsky; Thadeus von Sievers; Pavel Plehve; Alexander Litvinov

Units involved
(German Empire) 8th Army (German Empire) 10th Army (German Empire) Armee-Gruppe Gallwitz	1st Army; 10th Army; 12th Army

Strength
540,278	722,441; 1,332 machine guns 5,189 guns

Casualties and losses
60,000–90,000	308,000

The Battle of Łomża was a series of large-scale battles between the Imperial German and Imperial Russian armies in the spring of 1915 on the territory of modern Poland and Lithuania. The Russians were able to repulse the Second German offensive on Przasnysz, but the Imperial German army also repulsed several major offensives of the Russian army.

== Background ==
After repelling the German offensive on the Bobr and Narew rivers, the chief of staff of the North-Western Front, Nikolai Ruzsky, had to develop success and return to the January plan for the invasion at Germany. On the night of February 27, the commander of the 1st Army, Cavalry General Alexander Litvinov, sent Ruzsky proposals for the development of the operation - an attack on Willenberg and Janowo, which was supposed to improve the situation of the entire front. But in order to provide from Płock and Mława and support the offensive itself with the forces of two Siberian army corps and the 38th Infantry Division, Litvinov asked to reinforce 1st Army with a fresh division, and preferably a corps.

At Russian Headquarters, by this time, they had abandoned the development of a new offensive within East Prussia. On March 1, Infantry General Nikolai Yanushkevich announced to Ruzsky: no longer be drawn into East Prussia, but deliver strong short blows, pursue only to the border and in no case weaken the armies on the left bank of the Vistula. On March 2, Ruzsky gave a directive on the general offensive of the armies of the front: the 10th to Lipsk and Sopotskin to clear the Augustów Primeval Forest from the Germans and a possible exit to Augustów, Kalvarija and Suwałki; 12th - from Łomża and Novogrod, 1st - to Mława and Khorzhel. The 2nd and 5th Armies were to hold positions on Bzura, Rawka and Pilica. At the same time, the commander-in-chief did not lose hope of capturing the southern part of the Masurian Lakes as a base for further actions. The balance of power was favorable for the Russian army.

German troops from the coast of the Baltic Sea in the area of the state border to Płock went over to the defensive in equipped positions. Taking into account the losses suffered, they were seriously inferior to the Russian troops in manpower, machine guns and artillery.

== General Russian offensive in early March ==
During March 1, regiments of the 1st Army Corps (22nd and 24th Infantry Divisions, commander General of Infantry A. Dushkevich) transferred from behind the Vistula arrived in the 12th Army. On the morning of March 2, they launched an offensive, but suffered heavy casualties from the fire of riflemen and artillery (only in the 22nd Infantry Division - 40 officers and 3,500 soldiers) and lay down 200-500 steps from the German positions in the hope of taking them with a night attack. Together with the 22nd Infantry Division, the 2nd Guards Infantry Division of Lieutenant General Pavel Pototsky advanced, which managed to take the high 74.4 south of the Chude village. In the detachment of Lieutenant General S. Savvich, the 10th Siberian Rifle Division took the Kierzek village, heavily fortified and defended by four Landsturm battalions and the 75th Infantry Brigade, captured prisoners (10 officers and 260 soldiers) and 2 machine guns. The commander of the 38th Siberian Rifle Regiment, Colonel B. Dzerozhinsky, died in the battle. 5th Army Corps moved forward slowly, also meeting with increasingly fierce resistance from the Germans. To strengthen the attacks, the 62nd Infantry Division arrived in the 12th Army, removed from the front of the 5th Army on the Rawka River.

Within a week, the Russian 10th Army was able to recover from the defeat in the Second Battle of the Masurian Lakes. On March 1, the new commander of the army, General of Infantry E. Radkevich again led the troops on the offensive against Lipsk. The 3rd Siberian and 26th Army Corps, reinforced by the remnants of the regiments of the 20th Army Corps that had escaped from the encirclement, moved forward.

The advance of the Russian 10th Army did not meet with such stubborn resistance as in the plots of its neighbors on the left. As early as February 26, the commander of the German 10th Army, Colonel General Hermann von Eichhorn, concluded that it was impossible to attack two strong Russian fortresses with limited forces. He reported this to P. von Hindenburg and took steps to secretly withdraw troops from February 28 to a fortified position along the banks of the Bóbr River to Lipsk and the Augustów Canal.

March 2 E. Radkevich gave the order to attack. The detachment of Major General V. Maidel (1st Cavalry Division, 1st Separate Infantry Brigade) entrenched itself on the banks of the Neman River and began to restore bridges. The southern flank of the army was defeated, met by a counterattack by the German 2nd Infantry and 80th Reserve Divisions. Up to 900 Russian soldiers were captured, the trophies of the Russian 2nd and 26th Army Corps amounted to only 67 prisoners. On March 5, the offensive ceased on almost the entire sector of the Russian 10th Army. The Germans also suffered significant damage, and on the night of March 6, the German XXI Army, XXXIX and XL Reserve Corps were withdrawn to a fortified position along the Augustow Canal, south of Augustow and Suwalki.

The 12th Russian Army, despite a significant superiority in forces on March 3–4, were unable to complete their tasks. The Guards, 5th Army Corps and Savvich's detachment fought stubborn battles for Błędowo, Lipniki. The offensive of the Guards Corps was also repelled. It was decided to reinforce the strike group with a brigade from the 3rd Caucasian Army Corps.

== Second German offensive on Przasnysz ==
The German 8th Army formed a section of the XXXVIII Reserve Corps (commander General of the Cavalry Georg von der Marwitz, the 75th Reserve and 4th Cavalry Divisions, the Königsberg Reserve and the 5th Infantry Brigade) with the task of pushing the Russians back beyond the Narew River and blocking the crossings near Nowogród. On March 4, the Marwitz group struck at the Guards Corps, knocked out the 2nd Cavalry Division from Lipnik. The withdrawal of the cavalry pulled the 5th Rifle Brigade along with it. The further advance of the German Marwitz group was stopped in stubborn battles on March 5.

The troops of the Russian 1st Army showed themselves most actively. On March 3, 1st and 2nd Siberian Army Corps began fighting near Dębsk. 1st Turkestan and 27th Army Corps occupied Stump-Pole; a brigade of the 79th Infantry Division from Novogeorgievsk was introduced into the battle, but further movement was stopped by the Germans.

Taking into account the threat of a breakthrough of the front near Mlava, artillery general M. von Gallwitz, after holding a meeting with the corps commanders and with the chief of staff of the Supreme Commander of All German Forces in the East, Lieutenant General E. Ludendorff, decided to launch a counterattack covering the flank of the 2nd Siberian Army Corps. The operation was entrusted to the group of Lieutenant General С. von Morgen, although he was more inclined to strike at the 1st Cavalry Corps, as being weaker in defence. Morgen's group was reinforced by two regiments of the 76th Reserve Division and the 5th Guards Brigade. The offensive was to begin after March 7.

On March 6, the cavalry detachment of Lieutenant General V. Himetz, 1st and 2nd Siberian Army Corps again failed to break through the German positions fortified with barbed wire, despite the assistance of the 17th Infantry Division. 1st Turkestan Army Corps with the 38th Infantry Division again fought for the village of Pieńpole, which they lost at night. The left flank of the 1st Army managed to move forward, during the five days of the offensive, the 1st Army captured 10 officers and 727 German soldiers and captured 4 machine guns.

On March 7, the situation on the right flank of the 1st Army was repeated. Parts of the 1st Cavalry and 2nd Siberian Army Corps could not take Rycice and were driven back by counterattacks. The 1st and 4th Siberian Rifle Regiments broke through two rows of barbed wire at Grzybowo-Kapuśnik, but were surrounded and barely made their way to their trenches with the loss of 390 prisoners. The Turkestan corps captured Budy Sułkowskie, which was defended by the 61st Landwehr Infantry Regiment, but the counterattack of the 99th Landwehr Regiment drove the arrows out of the village and lost up to 900 prisoners.

On March 8, the Morgen's group launched an offensive with the forces of the 1st and 76th Reserve Divisions and the 11th Reserve Brigade. During the day, the 42nd Infantry Regiment and the 5th Guards Brigade joined the attack. The attackers took a strong Russian position at Grabowo (2,000 prisoners). The threat of a detour and the failure of the night attack forced Generals V. Oranovsky and A. Sychevsky to retreat.

Continuing to develop success, parts of the Morgen group on March 9 during the day threw back Russian troops to Przasnysz. The threat of being cut off forced A. Sychevsky to begin withdrawing the 2nd Siberian Army Corps to Przasnysz. The commander of the 1st Army at 21 o'clock ordered to withdraw to the Przasnysz positions, and the cavalry corps to provide reconnaissance on the right flank and ensure communication with the 12th Army, stubbornly defending the crossings on the Orzyc. Following the Siberian corps, under pressure from the enemy, the Turkestan and 27th Army Corps retreated.

N. Ruzsky, concerned about the situation in the 1st Army, allocated two corps to support it: the 23rd Army Corps (3rd Guards and 62nd Infantry Divisions), which had already arrived, and the 2nd Caucasian, crossing the bridges in Novogeorgievsk (Caucasian Grenadier and 51st Infantry Division). By the evening of March 10, the Cossacks of the 4th Don Cossack Division managed to stop the advance of the Germans. Under the onslaught of the Germans, the Siberian corps again retreated to Przasnysz. Having captured 1,200 prisoners in a day, the troops of the Morgen's group occupied Kluczewo, Rzęgnowo.

On March 11, the German troops of the Morgen's group continued to advance. The number of prisoners reached 1,400. After air reconnaissance detected the approach of Russian troops from Ostrołęka to Rusetsk (23rd Army Corps), the 3rd Infantry and 9th Landwehr Brigades were sent. The Russian troops of the 1st Army in the morning entrenched themselves in new positions near Przasnysz, forcing the Germans to lie down and dig in 1,500 steps away. Considering that 9 corps and 5 cavalry divisions were operating against his incomplete 6 corps and three cavalry divisions from the Russian side, Gallwitz ordered to stop attacks, go on the defensive and staunchly defend the achieved lines, preventing the Russians from leaving their defensive lines at Przasnysz.

On March 12, units of the 1st Army were already able to push the Germans at Stegna with the forces of the 4th Cavalry Brigade and the 8th Cavalry Division, the 15th Cavalry Division occupied Lipa; under dense artillery fire of the 2nd Siberian Army Corps, the Germans left Mchowo and Kijowice. The second offensive of the Gallwitz's army group on Przasnysz was stopped.

== Offensive Russian 1st and 12th Armies ==
On March 13, Ruzsky ordered the resumption of the attack on the southern border of East Prussia, advancing with the forces of the 1st and 12th Armies. The Russian troops of the 1st Army went on the offensive, but they met strong resistance along the entire length of the front and were able to occupy only the points already cleared by the Germans. Litvinov decided to support the attacks of the Siberian corps by moving to cover the 19th and 23rd Army Corps. On the night of March 14, the 1st Turkestan Army Corps again occupied Grudusk.

Assessing the results of the day, Gallwitz concluded that it was necessary at all costs to force the Russian armies to go on the defensive, for which, if possible, strike at Różan, Ostrołęka with two corps. On March 16, Gallwitz ordered Lieutenant General C. von Morgen to recapture Gmina Jednorożec: the 36th Reserve Division was able to recapture the village, return 2 guns and captured 2,000 prisoners. The Russian troops of the 19th Army Corps were also pressed back, and the attacks of the 1st Turkestan Corps were also repulsed.

At the Russian Headquarters, the development of the operation at Przasnysz was followed with great concern. In mid-March, the most intense battles fell in the Carpathians: in addition to that, the Germans delivered short blows on the front from Pilica to Nida, which again made the staff of the Supreme Commander-in-Chief question the advisability of simultaneous offensive operations in different directions. The Russian War Department announced a sharp decrease in stocks of rifles and artillery ammunition. Shells required 1.75 million pieces per month, and their release seriously lagged behind the estimated need. There was a shortage of rifles at the front - only about 60,000 of them were produced per month, while even in Austria-Hungary, factories produced 64,000 rifles and 950,000 artillery shells per month.

On March 13, Chief of Staff of the Supreme Commander General of Infantry N. Yanushkevich telegraphed Ruzsky: "Due to the extreme difficulty of replenishing losses in people with a shortage of rifles and the need to save firearms supplies, the Supreme Commander asks you to keep these circumstances in mind when establishing the nearest tasks to the armies of the front entrusted to you, as well as to limit, as necessary, the commanders of the armies subordinate to you in assigning to the troops such offensive tasks of a private nature, which do not follow directly from the general task performed by the armies of the front, and lead only to aimless losses of people and the expenditure of firearms".

On March 14, Yanushkevich again pointed out to Ruzsky the need to "consolidate and improve the current position." The next day, Ruzsky turned for clarification to the Quartermaster General of the Stavka, General of Infantry Yuri Danilov, who formulated the immediate task for the armies of the North-Western Front: to hold a bridgehead on the left bank of the Vistula River, stop the enemy’s advance between the Vistula and the Neman and defeat him in order to occupy more advantageous positions for the defense of Bobr and Tsarev. For broader actions, as Danilov believed, it was necessary "to equip, first of all, our army and save on firearms."

On the night of March 17, Ruzsky issued a directive to continue the offensive. The offensive of the 1st and 12th Army during March 17–24 did not bring success, despite continuous attacks with huge losses in manpower.

On March 25, there was a temporary lull. Gallwitz, sent P. von Hindenburg a report on the operation, estimating Russian casualties at 100,000 men (including 42,000 prisoners) and his own at 37-38 thousand men. He concluded that no decisive success was achieved during the fighting, but everything was done to nullify all Russian attempts to break through the front.

The activity of operations on the front of the 1st and 12th Armies began to decrease. This became especially noticeable after the dismissal of Ruzsky, on March 26, and his quartermaster general M. Bonch-Bruyevich, “for health reasons”. On March 30, General of Infantry M. Alekseyev, who had previously been chief of staff of the armies of the Southwestern Front, was appointed the new commander-in-chief.

On March 28, A. Litvinov created the M. Pleshkov group for further actions, uniting the 19th, 23rd and 1st Siberian Army Corps and the detachment of M. Grabbe under his command. But the reconnaissance carried out showed that the enemy positions are “almost a continuous trench, sometimes the trenches are located in several tiers”, with ditches, palisades, barbed wire fences, with wire fences and nets. The attack had to be abandoned. The troops received an order from P. Pleve on March 29 "to strengthen as firmly as possible in the positions they occupied and defend them in the most stubborn way."

== Offensive Russian 10th Army ==
In the sector of the Russian 10th Army, also during the first half of March, attempts were made to develop an offensive against Marijampolė, Augustów, and Suwałki. On March 7–8, the Russian 3rd Army Corps advanced towards Simnas. But the Russian Kaunas detachment suffered heavy losses and was stopped at Marijampolė. The rest of the corps stood still and could not move forward, and the 15th Army Corps was assigned to the reserve of the commander in chief. Having intercepted Russian radio messages about the movement of the 2nd Army Corps, the commander of the German 10th Army X. von Eichhorn decided to launch a short counterattack, for which a group of Lieutenant General Otto von Lauenstein was assembled (31st Infantry, 77th and 78th Reserve, 1st Cavalry Division).

On March 9, the Germans from the second half of the day tried to go on the offensive, and on the entire front of the 10th Army, the Russian advance stopped - the Germans stubbornly defended themselves. On March 10, Lauenstein's group struck and pushed back the 73rd Infantry Division, reinforcements of the Russian 56th Infantry Division were defeated and partly surrounded, broke through with great difficulty, leaving 3 guns. On March 12, N. Kaznakov's cavalry with armoured vehicles was sent to the rear of the Germans, and the Kaunas detachment continued to advance towards Marijampolė. 3rd Army Corps tried to go on the offensive, but was stopped. Russian troops lost 5,400 prisoners and several guns. In the following days, the fighting began to subside.

By March 15, the German 10th Army again went on the defensive. This time it was not possible to destroy at least part of the Russian 10th Army, leaving 5,400 prisoners in the hands of the Germans, the Russian corps got out of the blow. The headquarters of the 10th army was supposed to transfer to the Gallwitz's army group the control of the I Corps of the 2nd Infantry and 78th Reserve Divisions. Subsequently, on this sector of the front, the actions of the parties took on the character of episodic offensive attempts by relatively small forces. On March 16, Russian detachments on the right flank of the 10th Army intensified their operations. Their task was to capture Tauragė and Memel, followed by an attack on Tilsit. Apukhtin's detachment (1st Brigade of the 68th Infantry Division, 7th and 16th Brigades of the state militia - 10 squads, 18 guns) approached Tauragė and started a battle for the city. The Germans offered extremely stubborn resistance and retreated only on March 20.

On March 18, the detachment of Potapov captured Memel with a surprise attack and fortified in front of the city. Massacre and looting began in the city. The command of the German 10th Army assessed the threat and sent significant forces to Memel: the 4th and 6th Cavalry Divisions and 6 infantry battalions. The Cossacks of the vanguard, having met the enemy, hastily retreated. On March 21, due to heavy shelling and the threat of landing, Potapov withdrew troops from Memel, but received an order from the army headquarters to return and leave the city only in the event of an offensive by superior enemy forces, having previously taken out or destroyed everything of value. Hostages were taken among the population.

The commander of the 10th Army, Infantry General E. Radkevich, decided to use the unexpected success of the right flank and launch an offensive along the entire front, while the corps of the left flank (3rd Siberian and 2nd Army Corps) were to prevent the enemy from leaving the Augustow Forest. On March 22, the army centre developed an offensive in order to drive the enemy from positions at Marijampolė, Suwałki and Augustów. However, there was little progress. The use of armoured vehicles in battle was only partly justified: the Germans stubbornly held on, and one vehicle was lost to artillery and machine gun fire along with the crew.

On the evening of March 21, Potapov's detachment left Memel under pressure from the enemy. In total, Potapov lost 149 men, 4 machine guns and a gun. Apukhtin's detachment moved to Tilsit, but on March 24 was defeated, losing 8 officers and 600 soldiers, including the commander of the 270th Gatchina Infantry Regiment, Colonel, was missing. On March 25–26, the troops of the 10th Army met such strong resistance that even if they were successful, they could not keep what they had captured. On March 28–29, on the entire front of the 10th Army, the Germans launched counterattacks, sometimes creating a threatening situation. The fighting these days was especially stubborn. On March 30–31, the activity of fighting began to decline. The offensive of the 10th Army ended with a slight advance and a number of partial defeats, especially on the right flank. During March 18–31, the 10th Army lost 2,244 men killed, 3,290 missing, 6,031 wounded. 2 officers and 429 German soldiers were captured. Augustów and Suwałki were not repulsed.

== Outcome ==
During the First battle of Przasnysz and Łomża's operation, the last section of the Russian-German front between the Vistula and Bobr rivers turned into a continuous defensive line fortified by both sides. Both opponents subsequently devoted several months (from April to mid-July) to the creation of new defensive zones in the depths of their positions and to find, as far as possible, weak points in each other's defences. The German command failed to develop the success of the Second Battle of the Masurian Lakes, especially in the face of limited replenishment of personnel and ammunition, which forced the chief of staff of the Supreme Commander of All German Forces in the East, Lieutenant General E. Ludendorff, to talk about the "collapse of hopes." The Russian command - from Supreme Command to the headquarters of the armies of the North-Western Front - also failed to solve the intended tasks, namely, to capture East Prussia. It was also not possible to push the enemy back from the territory of the Russian Empire, despite the constantly maintained superiority in forces.

Stubborn two-month battles along the entire front line from Memel to the mouth of the Narew River testified that the Russian troops were able to overcome the negative consequences of the Second Battle of the Masurian Lakes. Despite the fact that the offensive was stopped by the stubborn and skilful resistance of the German troops, the active actions of the armies of the North-Western Front deprived the Germans of the opportunity to provide effective assistance to the Austro-Hungarian troops in the Carpathians and forced the command of the Central Powers in the East to be convinced of the failure of the main idea of the winter campaign, proclaimed even at a meeting in Oppeln on December 19, 1914: flank attacks did not lead to the withdrawal of Russian troops across the Vistula River and from the Carpathians, and even more so for the middle reaches of the Bug River. Moreover, the Russian side managed to reserve up to two corps for the development of the offensive by the armies of the Southwestern Front and maintain the theoretical threat of a new invasion of East Prussia both from the south and from the east.

Both sides suffered heavy losses and did not achieve the main goals set by the command. With sufficient evidence, the Przasnysz-Łomża battles showed the advantage of the defenders over the attackers, primarily based on the preparation of strong and deep defensive positions, equipped with a large number of guns and machine guns, and on the German side, the use of mortars. The trophies of the German troops at the end of February - April 1915 were much more modest than those of Second Battle of the Masurian Lakes: 67,343 prisoners, 45 guns and 78 machine guns, banners of the 249th Danube and 250th Baltic Regiments. Painful for the Russian side was the loss of several aircraft and almost a dozen armoured vehicles (the crews of the latter from March refused to go into battle under enemy artillery fire). Russian troops captured 127 officers, 12,562 soldiers (of which 69 were Austro-Hungarian), captured 76 machine guns, 4 mortars, 16 guns, 2 planes that made an emergency landing, the banner of the German 34th Fusilier Regiment.

== Analysis ==
Analysing the reasons for the failure of offensive actions, the commander of the 1st Army, A. Litvinov, noted as the main ones: “inaccuracies, ambiguities, contradictions” in combat reports, “providing material for operational considerations and orders”, then that “commanders and their headquarters are located too far from the troops, controlling the latter only with the help of technical means and avoiding personal influence on subordinate units” (on the German side, E. Ludendorff reproached K. von Morgen for the same), “weak supervision of people during the battle", leading to a large number of "arbitrarily going to the rear" and "a huge percentage of wounded in the fingers."

The order of the Russian Supreme Commander dated March 25, 1915 also noted “the insufficiently caring attitude of commanding officials to saving the forces of people and horse composition”, “phenomena that are criminal in their consequences”: “it is customary to evaluate the success of combat work...the number of casualties incurred”, "winding up parts and a useless waste of time and effort", "intelligence is very lame."

Indeed, the effectiveness of reconnaissance (and its conduct was seriously hampered by the presence of fortified lines and barriers), the wider use of aviation for it, the interception of radiograms and telephone conversations, and the embellishment of the results of battles seriously influenced subsequent decision-making. It is no coincidence that since February, weekly reports on the state of ammunition have been made by the armies along the operational line of the headquarters of the armies of the Russian North-Western Front, and since March, they began to report daily on the losses incurred. But in general (and this was also typical of the German troops), the insufficient effectiveness of combat activity, the unresolved tasks by the troops were caused by mutual underestimation of the enemy’s forces, his capabilities for prolonged resistance and recovery after the defeats suffered, the loss in a number of cases by the high command of command and control, low the quality of information about the enemy and the effectiveness of their own actions, difficulties in supplying and replenishing troops.
