= Szpaki =

Szpaki may refer to:

- Szpaki, Masovian Voivodeship, a village in the administrative district of Gmina Dzierzgowo, within Mława County, Masovian Voivodeship, in east-central Poland
- Szpaki, Podlaskie Voivodeship, a village in the administrative district of Gmina Wyszki, within Bielsk County, Podlaskie Voivodeship, in north-eastern Poland
- Szpaki-Kolonia, a village in the administrative district of Gmina Stara Kornica, within Łosice County, Masovian Voivodeship, in east-central Poland

== See also ==
- Szpak
