= Międzyleś =

Międzyleś may refer to the following places:

- Międzyleś, Lublin Voivodeship (east Poland)
- Międzyleś, Mława County in Masovian Voivodeship (east-central Poland)
- Międzyleś, Węgrów County in Masovian Voivodeship (east-central Poland)
- Międzyleś, Wołomin County in Masovian Voivodeship (east-central Poland)
