= Stegna (disambiguation) =

Stegna is a village and municipality seat in Pomeranian Voivodeship, northern Poland.

Stegna may also refer to the following places:

- Stegna, Mława County in Masovian Voivodeship (east-central Poland)
- Stegna, Rhodes, a settlement in Rhodes, Greece
- Stegna, Przasnysz County in Masovian Voivodeship (east-central Poland)
- Stegna, Sochaczew County in Masovian Voivodeship (east-central Poland)
