= Bonisław =

Bonisław refers to the following places in Poland:

- Bonisław, Mława County
- Bonisław, Sierpc County
