= Malkow =

Małków may refer to the following places:

- Malków, Łódź Voivodeship (central Poland)
- Małków, Łódź Voivodeship (central Poland)
- Małków, Hrubieszów County in Lublin Voivodeship (east Poland)
- Małków, Łęczna County in Lublin Voivodeship (east Poland)
- Małków, Masovian Voivodeship (east-central Poland)
