= Zaki (disambiguation) =

Zaki is a given name and surname.

Zaki may also refer to:

- Zaki, Nigeria, local government area of Bauchi State
  - Kafin Zaki Dam, proposed reservoir in Bauchi State, Nigeria
- Żaki, village in Poland
- Borowskie Żaki, village in Poland
- Pieńki-Żaki, village in Poland
- Szepietowo-Żaki, village in Poland
- Zaki Gordon Institute, film school in Arizona
- Zaki, a band consisting of Jack Stauber, Alex Kirschner, Matt George, and Mitch Wettich
