= Brzozowo-Utraty =

- Village
- Location within Poland
- Coordinates: 53°12′02″N 20°40′01″E
- Country: Poland
- Voivodeship: Masovian
- County: Mława
- Gmina: Dzierzgowo

Brzozowo-Utraty [bʐɔˈzɔvɔ uˈtratɨ] is a village in the administrative district of Gmina Dzierzgowo. It is situated within Mława County, Masovian Voivodeship, in east-central Poland.
