= Józefin, Wołomin County =

Józefin
- Village
- Location within Poland
- Coordinates: 52°21′52″N 21°24′47″E
- Country: Poland
- Voivodeship: Masovian
- County: Wołomin
- Gmina: Poświętne

Józefin [juˈzɛfin] is a village in the administrative district of Gmina Poświętne, within Wołomin County, Masovian Voivodeship, in east-central Poland.
