= Tańsk-Chorąże =

- Village
- Location within Poland
- Coordinates: 53°10′56″N 20°35′25″E
- Country: Poland
- Voivodeship: Masovian
- County: Mława
- Gmina: Dzierzgowo
- Population: 21

Tańsk-Chorąże [ˈtaɲsk xɔˈrɔ̃ʐɛ] is a village in the administrative district of Gmina Dzierzgowo, within Mława County, Masovian Voivodeship, in east-central Poland.
