= Ruda, Mława County =

Ruda
- Village
- Location within Poland
- Coordinates: 53°10′N 20°40′E
- Country: Poland
- Voivodeship: Masovian
- County: Mława
- Gmina: Dzierzgowo

Ruda [ˈruda] is a village in the administrative district of Gmina Dzierzgowo, within Mława County, Masovian Voivodeship, in east-central Poland.
