= Poświętne, Wołomin County =

Poświętne
- Village
- Location within Poland
- Coordinates: 52°20′N 21°26′E
- Country: Poland
- Voivodeship: Masovian
- County: Wołomin
- Gmina: Poświętne
- Population: 290

Poświętne [pɔˈɕfjɛntnɛ] is a village in Wołomin County, Masovian Voivodeship, in east-central Poland. It is the seat of the gmina (administrative district) called Gmina Poświętne. It became a gmina in place of Cygów gmina and parish with its council, at the very end of the XIXth c., after the manor of Cygów was demolished and the estate auctioned off during Russian rule.
