= Wieczfnia Kościelna =

- Village
- Location within Poland
- Coordinates: 53°12′N 20°29′E
- Country: Poland
- Voivodeship: Masovian
- County: Mława
- Gmina: Wieczfnia Kościelna

Wieczfnia Kościelna [ˈvjɛt͡ʂfɲa kɔɕˈt͡ɕɛlna] is a village in Mława County, Masovian Voivodeship, in east-central Poland. It is the seat of the gmina (administrative district) called Gmina Wieczfnia Kościelna.
