= Pepłówek, Masovian Voivodeship =

Pepłówek
- Village
- Location within Poland
- Coordinates: 53°13′17″N 20°25′52″E
- Country: Poland
- Voivodeship: Masovian
- County: Mława
- Gmina: Wieczfnia Kościelna

Pepłówek [pɛˈpwuvɛk] is a village in the administrative district of Gmina Wieczfnia Kościelna, within Mława County, Masovian Voivodeship, in east-central Poland.
