= Choszczewka, Mława County =

Village in Gmina Dzierzgowo, Poland

Choszczewka
- Village
- Location within Poland
- Coordinates: 53°07′17″N 20°37′16″E
- Country: Poland
- Voivodeship: Masovian
- County: Mława
- Gmina: Dzierzgowo
- Population: 70

Choszczewka [xɔʂˈt͡ʂɛfka] is a village in the administrative district of Gmina Dzierzgowo, within Mława County, Masovian Voivodeship, in east-central Poland.
