= Kostusin, Masovian Voivodeship =

Kostusin
- Village
- Location within Poland
- Coordinates: 53°06′59″N 20°40′29″E
- Country: Poland
- Voivodeship: Masovian
- County: Mława
- Gmina: Dzierzgowo

Kostusin [kɔsˈtuɕin] is a village in the administrative district of Gmina Dzierzgowo, within Mława County, Masovian Voivodeship, in east-central Poland.
