= Cygów =

- Village
- Location within Poland
- Coordinates: 52°20′N 21°25′E
- Country: Poland
- Voivodeship: Masovian
- County: Wołomin
- Gmina: Poświętne

Cygów [ˈt͡sɨɡuf] is a village in the administrative district of Gmina Poświętne, within Wołomin County, Masovian Voivodeship, in east-central Poland.

Historically, Cygów was for centuries a gmina in its own right. It became a parish in the mid 15th century when the Ronczajski, a local landowning family, erected a wooden church there and saw it integrated into the diocese of Płock. By the mid 18th century, a courtier of King August III, one Dysmas Szymanowski acquired Cygów and a swath of forest and agricultural land containing a number of neighbouring villages, including Poświętne and turned it into his estate. He moved into Cygów manor. After the church was blown down in a storm, Szymanowski rebuilt it in 1762. It survived until 1939 when it succumbed to bombing by the Luftwaffe. By then, the parish was known as Poświętne. A new church was built on the site in the 1970s.

The reason for the disappearance of Cygów as a gmina is tied up with the declining economic and political fortunes of the Polish nation in the Russian partition and the terrible toll it exacted from many leading families. They were exhausted by two uprisings and financially depleted. So it was with the Szymanowski family who had lived and entertained many illustrious figures in Cygów for four generations, while providing local employment. Indeed, some of the workers were British or Irish gardeners to look after the glasshouses.

The last heir to the estate, Teodor (1846-1901), inherited it at the age of twenty and seemingly was not adequately supported to carry on estate responsibilities. He was, anyway, an erudite man more inclined towards social and moral questions, such as a united Europe, and combatting slavery in Africa. The level of debt became sufficiently problematic by 1885, and may have been used as a pretext, to call in the bailiffs to auction off the estate to different buyers. The family, for by then Teodor was married with children, became virtually destitute and sought a new life close to the wife's kin in the East, in Western Ukraine. The presence of a Russian general to oversee the disposal and the fact that the manor house was soon demolished, while Cygów ceased to be a viable administrative unit, is suggestive of the characteristic repression carried out by the Russian authorities (for the wider family's past political activities), since in effect, this Szymanowski family was sent into exile.

== Notable people associated with the Cygów circle ==
- Augustus III (1696-1763) King of Poland
- pl:Teodor Kajetan Szydłowski, (1697-1795) Voyevoda of Płock, father-in-law of Dysmas Szymanowski
- Dysmas Szymanowski (c.1719-1784) Sejm deputy, royal cupbearer and first Szymanowski lord of Cygów Manor
- Teodor Dysmas (1750-1804) chamberlain to King Stanisław August
- Stanisław August (1732-1798) last king of Poland
- Feliks Łubieński (1758-1848) minister of justice in the Kingdom of Poland, grandfather-in-law of Feliks Szymanowski
- Piotr Łubieński (1781-1867) officer in Russian campaign, general, insurgent in the November uprising, Freemason and father-in-law of Feliks Szymanowski
- Joachim Lelewel (1786-1861) historian and diarist, neighbour and friend of the Szymanowski
- Feliks Szymanowski (1791-1867) officer in Napoleon's Russian campaign, insurgent in the November uprising, Freemason and National Bank director
- Theodore de Korwin Szymanowski (1846-1901) proponent of a European Union and anti-slavery campaigner, last heir of Cygów
- Jacek Malczewski (1854-1929) leading painter and first cousin through his mother, née Szymanowska
- Father Bernard Łubieński (1846-1933) Redemptorist, diarist and Catholic missionary in England
