= Herschel L. Roman =

American geneticist

Herschel Lewis Roman
- Born: September 29, 1914; Szumsk, Poland
- Died: July 2, 1989 (aged 74); Swedish Medical Center, Seattle
- Education: University of Missouri
- Known for: Popularizing the use of yeast in genetic research
- Awards: Thomas Hunt Morgan Medal (1985)
- Scientific career
- Fields: Genetics
- Workplaces: University of Washington
- Doctoral advisor: Lewis Stadler

Herschel Lewis Roman (September 29, 1914 – July 2, 1989) was a geneticist who popularized the use of yeast in genetic research.

== Biography ==
Roman was born in Szumsk in eastern Poland on September 29, 1914. His father had moved to the United States, intending to bring Herschel and his mother, but they were not able to travel until 1921 because of World War I. After that, he spent his early years in northern Minnesota and Wisconsin, then in St. Louis, where they had sent Herschel in advance to provide him with an urban high school education. He enrolled at the University of Missouri in 1932 and, majoring in chemistry and minoring in physics, graduated in 1936. During his senior year, he met Lewis Stadler. For his graduate studies, Roman became Stadler's graduate student and switched to genetics.

In 1942 Roman received his Ph.D. in genetics from the University of Missouri, moved to Seattle in September, and joined the faculty of the Department of Botany at the University of Washington, where he stayed for the rest of his career. Around 1944, during World War II, he entered the Army Air Force, became a captain, and then returned to the University of Washington in 1946. He started studying the cytogenetics of maize, experimenting with their supernumerary B chromosomes, but found that the maize with "interesting" genes were not hardy enough to grow west of the Cascade Mountains. After difficult experiences with growing maize in a greenhouse, going to the California Institute of Technology each summer from 1946 to 1948, and growing corn in Cle Elum, Washington to get east of the Cascades, Roman decided to switch to studying Saccharomyces cerevisiae instead. He invited Carl Lindegren, faculty member at Washington University in St. Louis and the only yeast geneticist in the United States, to visit the University of Washington. From then on, Roman's concentration was on yeast genetics.

In 1952 and 1956, Roman spent sabbaticals in Paris working with Boris Ephrussi. The University of Washington established its Department of Genetics in June 1959, with Roman as chairman; he held the seat until August 1980.

Roman, who fellow yeast geneticist Geovanni Magni declared to be the "Pope of yeast genetics", received numerous honors during his career. He was president of the Genetics Society of America in 1968 and received its Thomas Hunt Morgan Medal in 1985, and was elected to the American Academy of Arts and Sciences in 1969 and the National Academy of Sciences in 1970. He also received honorary doctorates from Pierre and Marie Curie University (University of Paris 6) and the University of Missouri. He was also the founding editor of the Annual Review of Genetics.

Roman suffered a stroke in January 1976. He remained active in research until his death from stroke at Swedish Hospital in Seattle, Washington, on July 2, 1989, aged 74.
