= Nowe Brzozowo =

- Village
- Location within Poland
- Coordinates: 53°12′24″N 20°38′30″E
- Country: Poland
- Voivodeship: Masovian
- County: Mława
- Gmina: Dzierzgowo

Nowe Brzozowo [ˈnɔvɛ bʐɔˈzɔvɔ] is a village in the administrative district of Gmina Dzierzgowo, within Mława County, Masovian Voivodeship, in east-central Poland.
