= Tańsk-Kęsocha =

- Village
- Location within Poland
- Coordinates: 53°10′20″N 20°36′24″E
- Country: Poland
- Voivodeship: Masovian
- County: Mława
- Gmina: Dzierzgowo
- Population: 20

Tańsk-Kęsocha [ˈtaɲsk kɛ̃ˈsɔxa] is a village in the administrative district of Gmina Dzierzgowo, within Mława County, Masovian Voivodeship, in east-central Poland.
