= Nowy Cygów =

- Village
- Location within Poland
- Coordinates: 52°20′N 21°25′E
- Country: Poland
- Voivodeship: Masovian
- County: Wołomin
- Gmina: Poświętne

Nowy Cygów [ˈnɔvɨ ˈt͡sɨɡuf] is a village in the administrative district of Gmina Poświętne, within Wołomin County, Masovian Voivodeship, in east-central Poland.
