= Brzozowo-Dąbrówka =

Village in Gmina Dzierzgowo, Poland

- Village
- Location within Poland
- Coordinates: 53°11′21″N 20°38′51″E
- Country: Poland
- Voivodeship: Masovian
- County: Mława
- Gmina: Dzierzgowo

Brzozowo-Dąbrówka [bʐɔˈzɔvɔ dɔmˈbrufka] is a village in the administrative district of Gmina Dzierzgowo, within Mława County, Masovian Voivodeship, in east-central Poland.
