= Windyki, Masovian Voivodeship =

Windyki
- Village
- Location within Poland
- Coordinates: 53°08′53″N 20°28′26″E
- Country: Poland
- Voivodeship: Masovian
- County: Mława
- Gmina: Wieczfnia Kościelna

Windyki [vinˈdɨki] is a village in the administrative district of Gmina Wieczfnia Kościelna, within Mława County, Masovian Voivodeship, in east-central Poland.
