= Łęg, Mława County =

Łęg
- Village
- Location within Poland
- Coordinates: 53°13′18″N 20°32′50″E
- Country: Poland
- Voivodeship: Masovian
- County: Mława
- Gmina: Wieczfnia Kościelna

Łęg [wɛnk] is a village in the administrative district of Gmina Wieczfnia Kościelna, within Mława County, Masovian Voivodeship, in east-central Poland.
