= Krubki-Górki =

- Village
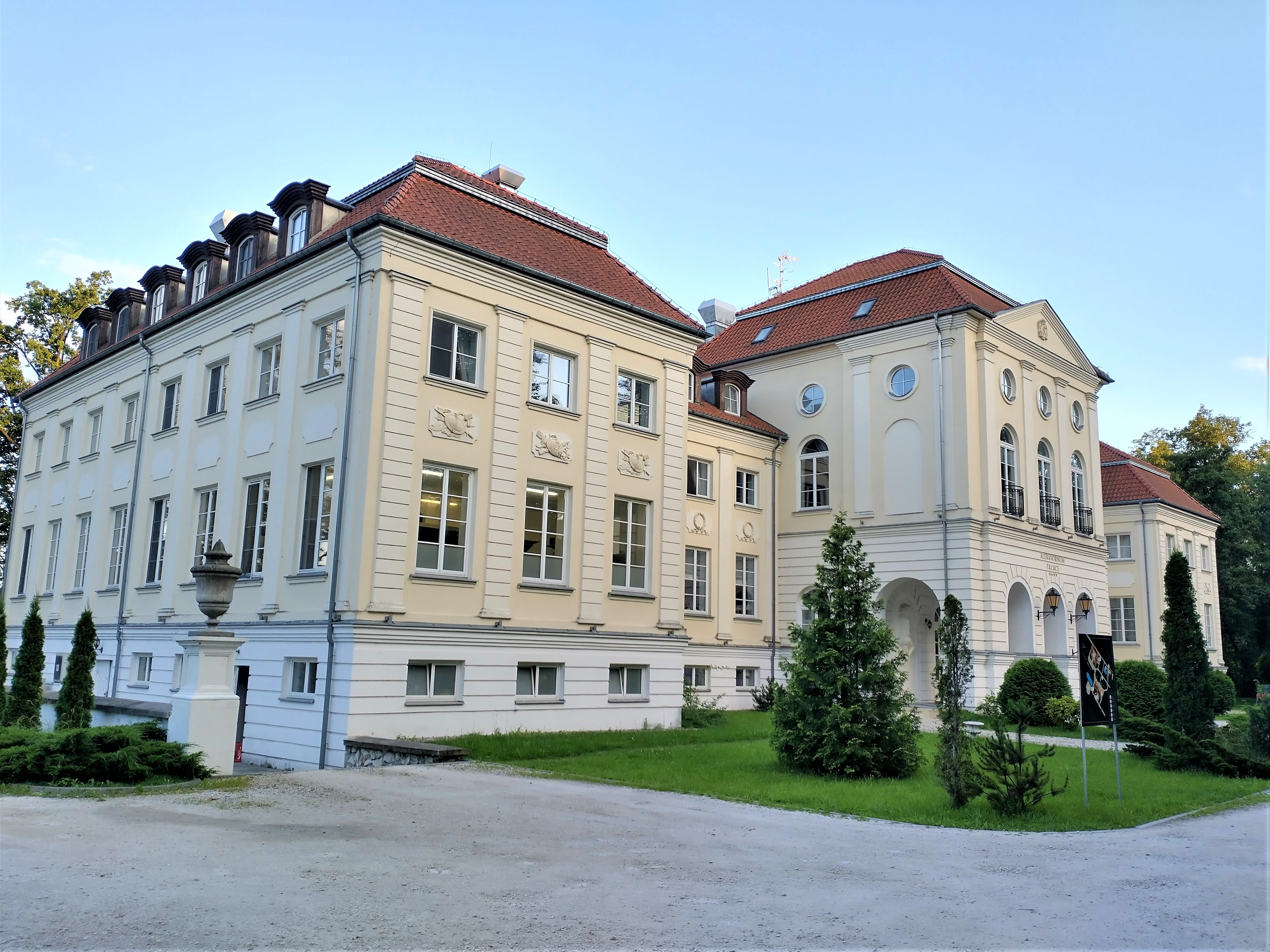
- Palace in Krubki-Górki

- Location within Poland
- Coordinates: 52°17′57″N 21°22′34″E
- Country: Poland
- Voivodeship: Masovian
- County: Wołomin
- Gmina: Poświętne
- Time zone: UTC+1 (CET)
  - Summer (DST): UTC+2 (CEST)
- Vehicle registration: WWL

Krubki-Górki [ˈkrupkʲi ˈɡurkʲi] is a village in the administrative district of Gmina Poświętne, within Wołomin County, Masovian Voivodeship, in east-central Poland.
