= Rojków, Masovian Voivodeship =

Rojków
- Village
- Location within Poland
- Coordinates: 52°19′36″N 21°28′00″E
- Country: Poland
- Voivodeship: Masovian
- County: Wołomin
- Gmina: Poświętne

Rojków [ˈrɔi̯kuf] is a village in the administrative district of Gmina Poświętne, within Wołomin County, Masovian Voivodeship, in east-central Poland.
