= Tańsk-Przedbory =

- Village
- Location within Poland
- Coordinates: 53°10′42″N 20°35′7″E
- Country: Poland
- Voivodeship: Masovian
- County: Mława
- Gmina: Dzierzgowo
- Population: 40

Tańsk-Przedbory [ˈtaɲsk pʂɛdˈbɔrɨ] is a village in the administrative district of Gmina Dzierzgowo, within Mława County, Masovian Voivodeship, in east-central Poland.
