= Wąsosze, Mława County =

Wąsosze
- Village
- Location within Poland
- Coordinates: 53°10′N 20°31′E
- Country: Poland
- Voivodeship: Masovian
- County: Mława
- Gmina: Wieczfnia Kościelna

Wąsosze [vɔ̃ˈsɔʂɛ] is a village in the administrative district of Gmina Wieczfnia Kościelna, within Mława County, Masovian Voivodeship, in east-central Poland.
