= Kielczykowizna =

- Village
- Location within Poland
- Coordinates: 52°19′22″N 21°23′21″E
- Country: Poland
- Voivodeship: Masovian
- County: Wołomin
- Gmina: Poświętne

Kielczykowizna [kʲɛlt͡ʂɨkɔˈvizna] is a village in the administrative district of Gmina Poświętne, within Wołomin County, Masovian Voivodeship, in east-central Poland.
