= Rogale, Masovian Voivodeship =

Rogale
- Village
- Location within Poland
- Coordinates: 53°08′01″N 20°34′00″E
- Country: Poland
- Voivodeship: Masovian
- County: Mława
- Gmina: Dzierzgowo

Rogale [rɔˈɡalɛ] is a village in the administrative district of Gmina Dzierzgowo, within Mława County, Masovian Voivodeship, in east-central Poland.
