= Pepłowo, Mława County =

Pepłowo
- Village
- Location within Poland
- Coordinates: 53°13′N 20°26′E
- Country: Poland
- Voivodeship: Masovian
- County: Mława
- Gmina: Wieczfnia Kościelna

Pepłowo [pɛˈpwɔvɔ] is a village in the administrative district of Gmina Wieczfnia Kościelna, within Mława County, Masovian Voivodeship, in east-central Poland.
