= Gmina Dzierzgowo =

Gmina Dzierzgowo Dzierzgowo Commune
- Gmina
- Interactive map of Gmina Dzierzgowo
- Coordinates (Dzierzgowo): 53°10′N 20°40′E
- Country: Poland
- Voivodeship: Masovian
- County: Mława
- Seat: Dzierzgowo

Area
  - Total: 150.63 km^{2} (58.16 sq mi)

Population (2013)
  - Total: 3,301
  - Density: 21.91/km^{2} (56.76/sq mi)

Gmina Dzierzgowo is a rural gmina (administrative district) in Mława County, Masovian Voivodeship, in east-central Poland. Its seat is the village of Dzierzgowo, which lies approximately 21 kilometres (13 mi) east of Mława and 108 km (67 mi) north of Warsaw.

The gmina covers an area of 150.63 square kilometres (58.2 sq mi), and as of 2006 its total population is 3,405 (3,301 in 2013).

== Villages ==
Gmina Dzierzgowo contains the villages and settlements of Brzozowo-Czary, Brzozowo-Dąbrówka, Brzozowo-Łęg, Brzozowo-Maje, Brzozowo-Utraty, Choszczewka, Dobrogosty, Dzierzgówek, Dzierzgowo, Kamień, Kitki, Kolonia Choszczewka, Kostusin, Krery, Kurki, Międzyleś, Nowe Brzozowo, Nowe Łączyno, Pęcherze, Pobodze, Rogale, Ruda, Rzęgnowo, Sosnówka, Stare Brzozowo, Stare Łączyno, Stegna, Szpaki, Szumsk, Szumsk-Sodowo, Tańsk-Chorąże, Tańsk-Grzymki, Tańsk-Kęsocha, Tańsk-Kiernozy, Tańsk-Przedbory, Tańsk-Umiotki, Wasiły, Wydrzywilk, Żaboklik and Zawady.

== Neighbouring gminas ==
Gmina Dzierzgowo is bordered by the gminas of Chorzele, Czernice Borowe, Grudusk, Janowiec Kościelny, Janowo, Krzynowłoga Mała, Szydłowo and Wieczfnia Kościelna.
