= Dzierzgowo =

- Village
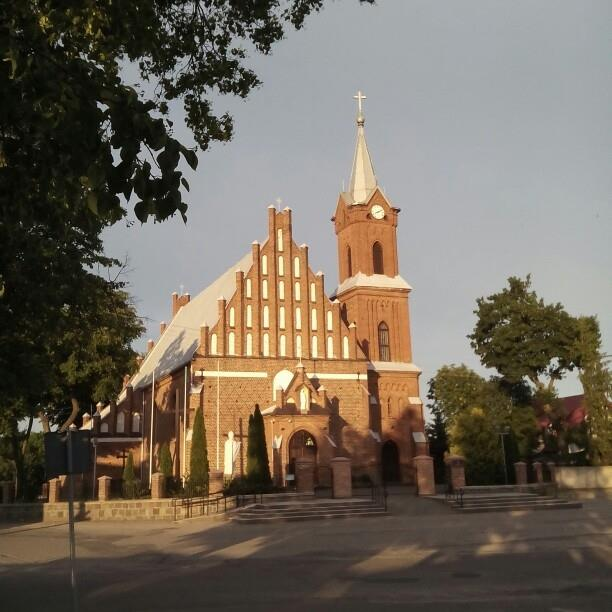
- Church of the Assumption of the Holy Virgin Mary

- Location within Poland
- Coordinates: 53°10′N 20°40′E
- Country: Poland
- Voivodeship: Masovian
- County: Mława
- Gmina: Dzierzgowo

Population
  - Total: 660

Dzierzgowo [d͡ʑɛʐˈɡɔvɔ] is a village in Mława County, Masovian Voivodeship, in east-central Poland. It is the seat of the gmina (administrative district) called Gmina Dzierzgowo.
