= Nadbiel =

- Village
- Location within Poland
- Coordinates: 52°22′N 21°21′E
- Country: Poland
- Voivodeship: Masovian
- County: Wołomin
- Gmina: Poświętne

Nadbiel [ˈnadbjɛl] is a village in the administrative district of Gmina Poświętne, within Wołomin County, Masovian Voivodeship, in east-central Poland.
