= Szumsk =

- Village
- Location within Poland
- Coordinates: 53°9′N 20°41′E
- Country: Poland
- Voivodeship: Masovian
- County: Mława
- Gmina: Dzierzgowo

Szumsk [ʂumsk] is a village in the administrative district of Gmina Dzierzgowo, within Mława County, Masovian Voivodeship, in east-central Poland.

== Notable person ==
Herschel L. Roman (1914–1999), geneticist, born in Szumsk
