= Wydrzywilk =

- Village
- Location within Poland
- Coordinates: 53°9′N 20°36′E
- Country: Poland
- Voivodeship: Masovian
- County: Mława
- Gmina: Dzierzgowo

Wydrzywilk [vɨˈdʐɨvilk] is a village in the administrative district of Gmina Dzierzgowo, in Mława County, Masovian Voivodeship, in east-central Poland.
