= Chmielewo Wielkie =

- Village
- Location within Poland
- Coordinates: 53°13′N 20°34′E
- Country: Poland
- Voivodeship: Masovian
- County: Mława
- Gmina: Wieczfnia Kościelna

Chmielewo Wielkie [xmjɛˈlɛvɔ ˈvjɛlkʲɛ] is a village in the administrative district of Gmina Wieczfnia Kościelna, within Mława County, Masovian Voivodeship, in east-central Poland.
