= Marianowo, Gmina Wieczfnia Kościelna =

Marianowo
- Village
- Location within Poland
- Coordinates: 53°12′37″N 20°27′16″E
- Country: Poland
- Voivodeship: Masovian
- County: Mława
- Gmina: Wieczfnia Kościelna

Marianowo [marjaˈnɔvɔ] is a village in the administrative district of Gmina Wieczfnia Kościelna, within Mława County, Masovian Voivodeship, in east-central Poland.
