= Zawady, Gmina Dzierzgowo =

Zawady
- Village
- Location within Poland
- Coordinates: 53°06′20″N 20°38′29″E
- Country: Poland
- Voivodeship: Masovian
- County: Mława
- Gmina: Dzierzgowo

Zawady [zaˈvadɨ] is a village in the administrative district of Gmina Dzierzgowo, within Mława County, Masovian Voivodeship, in east-central Poland.
