= Lewis Stadler =

American geneticist

Dr. Lewis Stadler
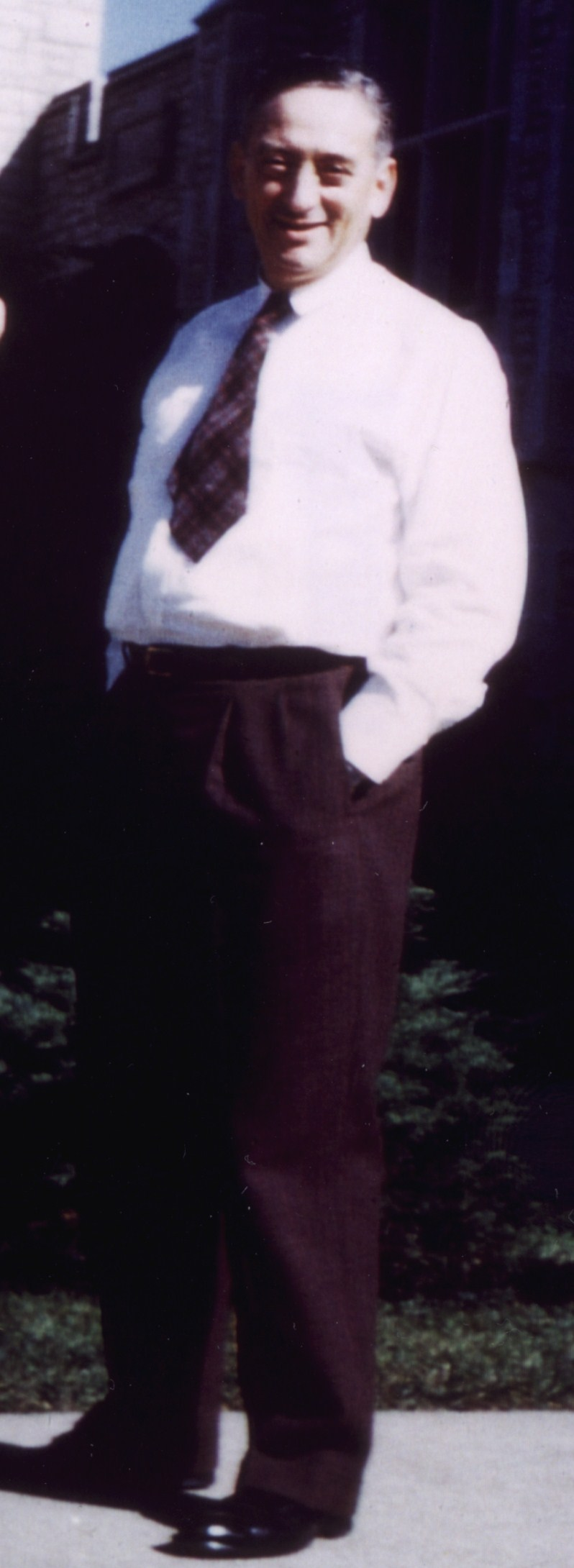
- Born: July 6, 1896; St. Louis, Missouri
- Died: May 12, 1954 (aged 57)
- Education: University of Missouri; University of Florida
- Known for: Research pertaining to the mutable effects of radiation on crops
- Scientific career
- Fields: Genetics
- Workplaces: University of Missouri; U.S. Department of Agriculture
- Doctoral students: Raymond E. Zirkle; Herschel L. Roman

Lewis John Stadler (July 6, 1896 – May 12, 1954) was an American geneticist. His research focused on the mutagenic effects of different forms of radiation on economically important plants like maize and barley.

== Biography ==
Lewis John Stadler was born in St. Louis, Missouri, in 1896 to Henry Louis and Josephine Ehrman Stadler. Stadler's early education efforts were unremarkable, but two summers worked on Midwestern farms sparked an interest in agriculture. He began his undergraduate work at the University of Missouri and completed a B.S. in agriculture at the University of Florida (1917). Afterwards, he returned to the University of Missouri and earned the A.M. (1918). Post-A.M., he enrolled in the Field Artillery of the United States Army, although his commission as Second Lieutenant was not used in overseas duty due to the end of World War I. Stadler spent 1919 in graduate studies at Cornell University under Harry Houser Love and Rollins A. Emerson. He returned again to the University of Missouri and completed his PhD in 1922. Following graduation, he joined the University of Missouri Department of Field Crops faculty. Stadler remained at Missouri until 1954 and acted as a visiting professor at the California Institute of Technology (1940), and Yale University (1950). He simultaneously held an appointment with the U.S. Department of Agriculture beginning in 1930. He was elected to the United States National Academy of Sciences in 1938. He was elected to the American Philosophical Society in 1941 and the American Academy of Arts and Sciences in 1949. Stadler completed presidential terms for several academic organizations, including Genetics Society of America, American Society of Naturalists, and Sigma Xi.

While Stadler spent almost his entire academic life at the University of Missouri he was also involved in external activities. During the 1930s Stadler participated in efforts to bring European scientists to the U.S. to escape Nazism. In 1948 Stadler was appointed a delegate to the Eighth International Congress of Genetics, which met in Stockholm. However, the U.S. Department of Agriculture rejected his passport application and conducted a loyalty investigation; Stadler initially thought it was a State Department action.

Stadler married Cornelia Field Tuckerman in 1919. They had six children: Maury, Henry, David, John, Eliot, and Joan.

Although Stadler's initial research was on field plot technique and agronomy, his main research interest became genetics, concentrated upon the study of mutation in corn. In 1925, he won a National Research Council Fellowship in Biology for a study in variation in linkage values in maize. He did much work on the effects of X-ray treatments, and did comparative studies of mutation caused by X-rays and by ultraviolet rays. His work earned him an international reputation.

He died of leukemia in 1954.

In his honor, the University of Missouri holds the Stadler Genetics Symposium every two years.
