= Tańsk-Umiotki =

- Village
- Location within Poland
- Coordinates: 53°10′20″N 20°36′24″E
- Country: Poland
- Voivodeship: Masovian
- County: Mława
- Gmina: Dzierzgowo

Tańsk-Umiotki [ˈtaɲsk uˈmjɔtki] is a village in the administrative district of Gmina Dzierzgowo, within Mława County, Masovian Voivodeship, in east-central Poland.
