= Tańsk-Grzymki =

- Village
- Location within Poland
- Coordinates: 53°10′37″N 20°34′12″E
- Country: Poland
- Voivodeship: Masovian
- County: Mława
- Gmina: Dzierzgowo
- Population: 40

Tańsk-Grzymki [ˈtaɲsk ˈɡʐɨmki] is a village in the administrative district of Gmina Dzierzgowo, within Mława County, Masovian Voivodeship, in east-central Poland.
