= Pęcherze =

- Village
- Location within Poland
- Coordinates: 53°11′55″N 20°37′46″E
- Country: Poland
- Voivodeship: Masovian
- County: Mława
- Gmina: Dzierzgowo

Pęcherze [pɛ̃ˈxɛʐɛ] is a village in the administrative district of Gmina Dzierzgowo, within Mława County, Masovian Voivodeship, in east-central Poland.
