= Załęże, Masovian Voivodeship =

Załęże
- Village
- Location within Poland
- Coordinates: 53°13′06″N 20°30′53″E
- Country: Poland
- Voivodeship: Masovian
- County: Mława
- Gmina: Wieczfnia Kościelna

Załęże [zaˈwɛ̃ʐɛ] is a village in the administrative district of Gmina Wieczfnia Kościelna, within Mława County, Masovian Voivodeship, in east-central Poland.
