= Chmielewo Małe =

- Village
- Location within Poland
- Coordinates: 53°12′19″N 20°34′19″E
- Country: Poland
- Voivodeship: Masovian
- County: Mława
- Gmina: Wieczfnia Kościelna
- Population: 50

Chmielewo Małe [xmjɛˈlɛvɔ ˈmawɛ] is a village in the administrative district of Gmina Wieczfnia Kościelna, within Mława County, Masovian Voivodeship, in east-central Poland.
