= Brzozowo-Maje =

- Village
- Location within Poland
- Coordinates: 53°13′39″N 20°39′7″E
- Country: Poland
- Voivodeship: Masovian
- County: Mława
- Gmina: Dzierzgowo

Brzozowo-Maje [bʐɔˈzɔvɔ ˈmajɛ] is a village in the administrative district of Gmina Dzierzgowo, within Mława County, Masovian Voivodeship, in east-central Poland.
