= Jadwiniew =

- Village
- Location within Poland
- Coordinates: 52°19′41″N 21°26′57″E
- Country: Poland
- Voivodeship: Masovian
- County: Wołomin
- Gmina: Poświętne
- Population: 160

Jadwiniew [jadˈviɲɛf] is a village in the administrative district of Gmina Poświętne, within Wołomin County, Masovian Voivodeship, in east-central Poland.
