= Zakrzewo-Ranki =

- Village
- Location within Poland
- Coordinates: 53°12′33″N 20°31′42″E
- Country: Poland
- Voivodeship: Masovian
- County: Mława
- Gmina: Wieczfnia Kościelna

Zakrzewo-Ranki [zaˈkʂɛvɔ ˈraŋki] is a village in the administrative district of Gmina Wieczfnia Kościelna, within Mława County, Masovian Voivodeship, in east-central Poland.
