= Michalinowo =

- Village
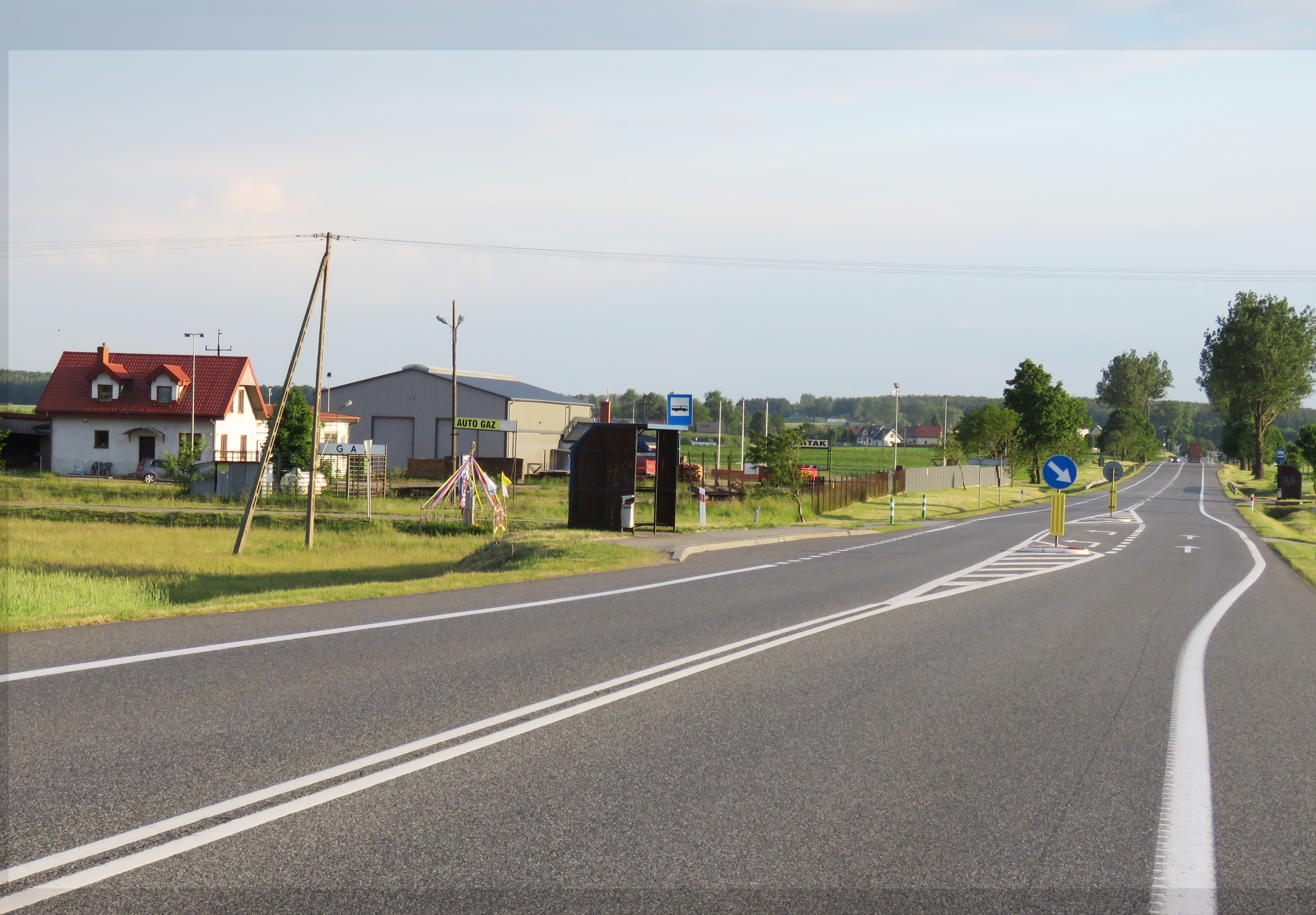

- Location within Poland
- Coordinates: 53°10′N 20°26′E
- Country: Poland
- Voivodeship: Masovian
- County: Mława
- Gmina: Wieczfnia Kościelna
- Time zone: UTC+1 (CET)
  - Summer (DST): UTC+2 (CEST)
- Vehicle registration: WML

Michalinowo [mixaliˈnɔvɔ] is a village in the administrative district of Gmina Wieczfnia Kościelna, within Mława County, Masovian Voivodeship, in north-central Poland.
