= Laskowizna, Wołomin County =

Laskowizna
- Village
- Location within Poland
- Coordinates: 52°21′13″N 21°25′11″E
- Country: Poland
- Voivodeship: Masovian
- County: Wołomin
- Gmina: Poświętne

Laskowizna [laskɔˈvizna] is a village in the administrative district of Gmina Poświętne, within Wołomin County, Masovian Voivodeship, in east-central Poland.
