= Gmina Poświętne, Masovian Voivodeship =

Gmina Poświętne Poświętne Commune
- Gmina
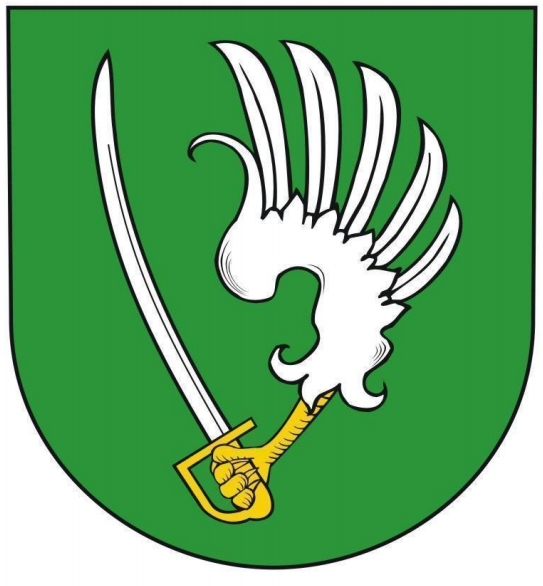
- Coat of arms

- Location within Poland
- Coordinates (Poświętne): 52°20′N 21°26′E
- Country: Poland
- Voivodeship: Masovian
- County: Wołomin
- Seat: Poświętne

Area
  - Total: 106.26 km^{2} (41.03 sq mi)

Population (2013)
  - Total: 6,081
  - Density: 57.23/km^{2} (148.2/sq mi)

Gmina Poświętne is a rural gmina (administrative district) in Wołomin County, Masovian Voivodeship, in east-central Poland. Its seat is the village of Poświętne, which lies approximately 12 kilometres (7 mi) east of Wołomin and 30 km (18 mi) north-east of Warsaw.

The gmina covers an area of 106.26 square kilometres (41.0 sq mi), and as of 2006 its total population is 5,849 (6,081 in 2013).

== Villages ==
Gmina Poświętne contains the villages and settlements of Choiny, Cygów, Czubajowizna, Dąbrowica, Helenów, Jadwiniew, Józefin, Kielczykowizna, Kolno, Krubki-Górki, Laskowizna, Małków, Międzyleś, Międzypole, Nadbiel, Nowe Ręczaje, Nowy Cygów, Ostrowik, Poświętne, Ręczaje Polskie, Rojków, Trzcinka, Turze, Wola Cygowska, Wola Ręczajska, Wólka Dąbrowicka and Zabraniec.

== Neighbouring gminas ==
Gmina Poświętne is bordered by the town of Zielonka and by the gminas of Klembów, Stanisławów, Strachówka, Tłuszcz and Wołomin.
