= Stare Brzozowo =

- Village
- Location within Poland
- Coordinates: 53°12′08″N 20°39′27″E
- Country: Poland
- Voivodeship: Masovian
- County: Mława
- Gmina: Dzierzgowo

Stare Brzozowo [ˈstarɛ bʐɔˈzɔvɔ] is a small village in the administrative district of Gmina Dzierzgowo, within Mława County, Masovian Voivodeship, in east-central Poland.
