= Międzypole, Masovian Voivodeship =

Międzypole
- Village
- Location within Poland
- Coordinates: 52°22′16″N 21°28′27″E
- Country: Poland
- Voivodeship: Masovian
- County: Wołomin
- Gmina: Poświętne

Międzypole [mjɛnd͡zɨˈpɔlɛ] is a village in the administrative district of Gmina Poświętne, within Wołomin County, Masovian Voivodeship, in east-central Poland.
