= Helenów, Gmina Poświętne =

Helenów
- Village
- Location within Poland
- Coordinates: 52°18′23″N 21°27′02″E
- Country: Poland
- Voivodeship: Masovian
- County: Wołomin
- Gmina: Poświętne

Helenów [xɛˈlɛnuf] is a village in the administrative district of Gmina Poświętne, within Wołomin County, Masovian Voivodeship, in east-central Poland.
