= Kolonia Choszczewka =

- Village
- Location within Poland
- Coordinates: 53°06′42″N 20°37′19″E
- Country: Poland
- Voivodeship: Masovian
- County: Mława
- Gmina: Dzierzgowo
- Population: 31

Kolonia Choszczewka [kɔˈlɔɲa xɔʂˈt͡ʂɛfka] is a village in the administrative district of Gmina Dzierzgowo, within Mława County, Masovian Voivodeship, in east-central Poland.
