= Gmina Wieczfnia Kościelna =

Gmina Wieczfnia Kościelna Wieczfnia Kościelna Commune
- Gmina
- Interactive map of Gmina Wieczfnia Kościelna
- Coordinates (Wieczfnia Kościelna): 53°12′N 20°29′E
- Country: Poland
- Voivodeship: Masovian
- County: Mława
- Seat: Wieczfnia Kościelna

Area
  - Total: 119.81 km^{2} (46.26 sq mi)

Population (2013)
  - Total: 4,222
  - Density: 35.24/km^{2} (91.27/sq mi)

Gmina Wieczfnia Kościelna is a rural gmina (administrative district) in Mława County, Masovian Voivodeship, in east-central Poland. Its seat is the village of Wieczfnia Kościelna, which lies approximately 13 kilometres (8 mi) north-east of Mława and 115 km (71 mi) north of Warsaw.

The gmina covers an area of 119.81 square kilometres (46.3 sq mi), and as of 2006 its total population is 4,200 (4,222 in 2013).

== Villages ==
Gmina Wieczfnia Kościelna contains the villages and settlements of Bąki, Bonisław, Chmielewko, Chmielewo Małe, Chmielewo Wielkie, Długokąty, Grądzik, Grzebsk, Grzybowo, Grzybowo-Kapuśnik, Kobiałki, Kuklin, Kulany, Kulany-Kolonia, Łęg, Marianowo, Michalinowo, Pepłówek, Pepłowo, Pogorzel, Rukały, Turowo, Uniszki Gumowskie, Uniszki Zawadzkie, Uniszki-Cegielnia, Wąsosze, Wieczfnia Kościelna, Wieczfnia-Kolonia, Windyki, Żaki, Zakrzewo Wielkie, Zakrzewo-Froczki, Zakrzewo-Ranki, Załęże and Żulinek.

== Neighbouring gminas ==
Gmina Wieczfnia Kościelna is bordered by the town of Mława and by the gminas of Dzierzgowo, Iłowo-Osada, Janowiec Kościelny and Szydłowo.
