= Wola Ręczajska =

- Village
- Location within Poland
- Coordinates: 52°19′N 21°24′E
- Country: Poland
- Voivodeship: Masovian
- County: Wołomin
- Gmina: Poświętne

Wola Ręczajska [ˈvɔla rɛnˈt͡ʂai̯ska] is a village in the administrative district of Gmina Poświętne, within Wołomin County, Masovian Voivodeship, in east-central Poland.
