= Nowe Ręczaje =

- Village
- Location within Poland
- Coordinates: 52°20′17″N 21°21′27″E
- Country: Poland
- Voivodeship: Masovian
- County: Wołomin
- Gmina: Poświętne

Nowe Ręczaje [ˈnɔvɛ rɛnˈt͡ʂajɛ] is a village in the administrative district of Gmina Poświętne, within Wołomin County, Masovian Voivodeship, in east-central Poland.
