= Grzybowo, Mława County =

Grzybowo
- Village
- Location within Poland
- Coordinates: 53°09′33″N 20°29′41″E
- Country: Poland
- Voivodeship: Masovian
- County: Mława
- Gmina: Wieczfnia Kościelna
- Time zone: UTC+1 (CET)
  - Summer (DST): UTC+2 (CEST)
- Vehicle registration: WML

Grzybowo [ɡʐɨˈbɔvɔ] is a village in the administrative district of Gmina Wieczfnia Kościelna, within Mława County, Masovian Voivodeship, in north-central Poland.

Twenty Polish citizens were murdered by Nazi Germany in the village during World War II.
