= Kuklin =

- Village
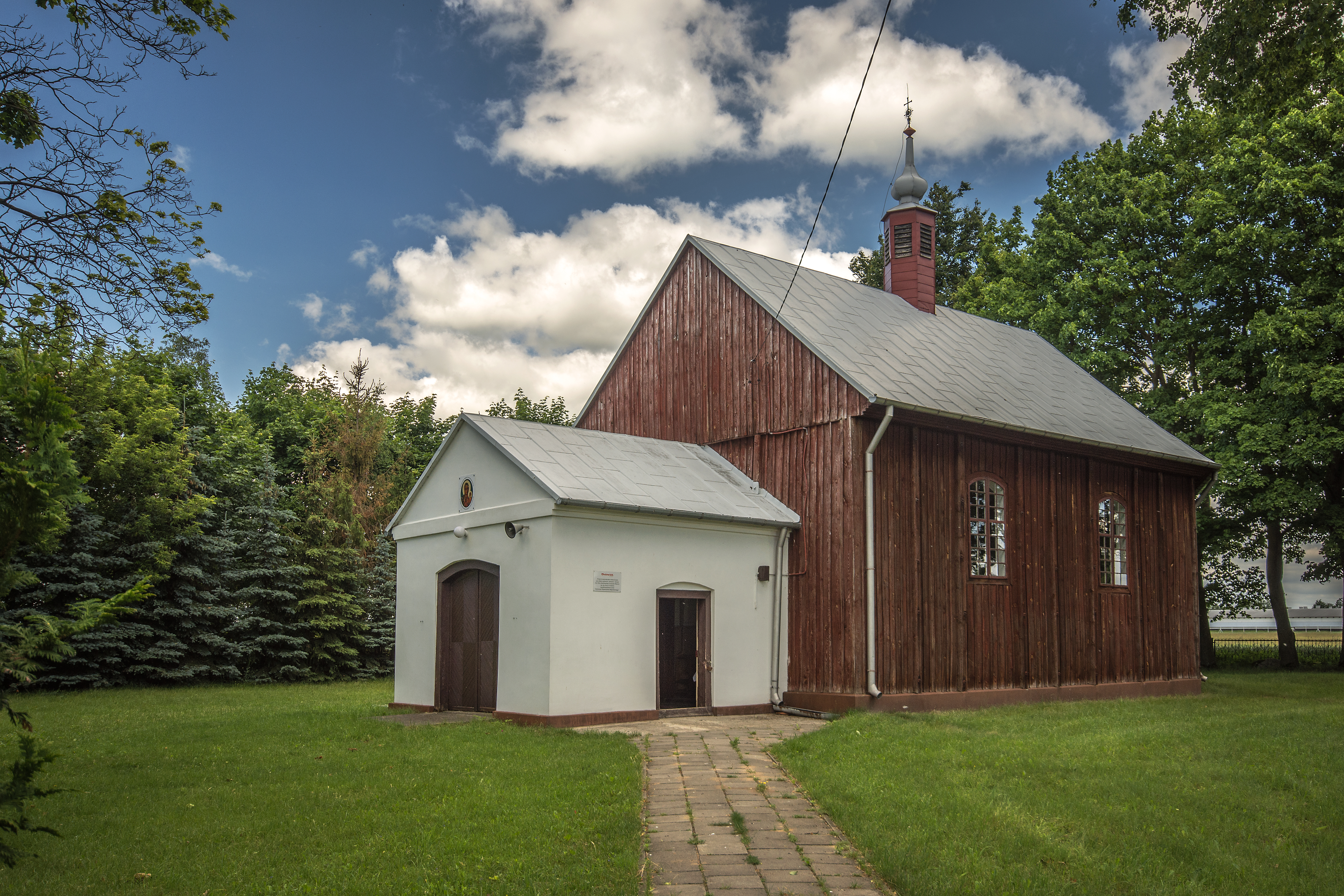
- Saint Anne church in Kuklin

- Location within Poland
- Coordinates: 53°11′16″N 20°26′32″E
- Country: Poland
- Voivodeship: Masovian
- County: Mława
- Gmina: Wieczfnia Kościelna
- Elevation: 170 m (560 ft)
- Time zone: UTC+1 (CET)
  - Summer (DST): UTC+2 (CEST)
- Vehicle registration: WML

Kuklin [ˈkuklin] is a village in the administrative district of Gmina Wieczfnia Kościelna, within Mława County, Masovian Voivodeship, in north-central Poland.
