= Tańsk-Kiernozy =

- Village
- Location within Poland
- Coordinates: 53°10′39″N 20°36′57″E
- Country: Poland
- Voivodeship: Masovian
- County: Mława
- Gmina: Dzierzgowo
- Population: 70

Tańsk-Kiernozy [ˈtaɲsk kʲɛrˈnɔzɨ] is a village in the administrative district of Gmina Dzierzgowo, within Mława County, Masovian Voivodeship, in east-central Poland.
