= Kamień, Mława County =

Kamień
- Village
- Location within Poland
- Coordinates: 53°07′24″N 20°41′05″E
- Country: Poland
- Voivodeship: Masovian
- County: Mława
- Gmina: Dzierzgowo

Kamień (Polish pronunciation: [ˈkamjɛj̃]) is a village in the administrative district of Gmina Dzierzgowo, within Mława County, Masovian Voivodeship, in east-central Poland.
