= Długokąty, Mława County =

Długokąty
- Village
- Location within Poland
- Coordinates: 53°11′N 20°33′E
- Country: Poland
- Voivodeship: Masovian
- County: Mława
- Gmina: Wieczfnia Kościelna

Długokąty [dwuɡɔˈkɔntɨ] is a village in the administrative district of Gmina Wieczfnia Kościelna, within Mława County, Masovian Voivodeship, in east-central Poland.
