= Ostrowik, Wołomin County =

Ostrowik
- Village
- Location within Poland
- Coordinates: 52°18′08″N 21°18′23″E
- Country: Poland
- Voivodeship: Masovian
- County: Wołomin
- Gmina: Poświętne

Ostrowik [ɔsˈtrɔvik] is a village in the administrative district of Gmina Poświętne, within Wołomin County, Masovian Voivodeship, in east-central Poland.
