= Dobrogosty, Masovian Voivodeship =

Dobrogosty
- Village
- Location within Poland
- Coordinates: 53°9′N 20°36′E
- Country: Poland
- Voivodeship: Masovian
- County: Mława
- Gmina: Dzierzgowo

Dobrogosty [dɔbrɔˈɡɔstɨ] is a village in the administrative district of Gmina Dzierzgowo, within Mława County, Masovian Voivodeship, in east-central Poland.
