= Rukały =

- Village
- Location within Poland
- Coordinates: 53°09′06″N 20°29′29″E
- Country: Poland
- Voivodeship: Masovian
- County: Mława
- Gmina: Wieczfnia Kościelna

Rukały [ruˈkawɨ] is a village in the administrative district of Gmina Wieczfnia Kościelna, within Mława County, Masovian Voivodeship, in east-central Poland.
