= Zakrzewo Wielkie, Mława County =

Zakrzewo Wielkie
- Village
- Location within Poland
- Coordinates: 53°13′N 20°32′E
- Country: Poland
- Voivodeship: Masovian
- County: Mława
- Gmina: Wieczfnia Kościelna

Zakrzewo Wielkie [zaˈkʂɛvɔ ˈvjɛlkʲɛ] is a village in the administrative district of Gmina Wieczfnia Kościelna, within Mława County, Masovian Voivodeship, in east-central Poland.
