= Małków, Masovian Voivodeship =

Małków
- Village
- Location within Poland
- Coordinates: 52°17′40″N 21°21′18″E
- Country: Poland
- Voivodeship: Masovian
- County: Wołomin
- Gmina: Poświętne

Małków [ˈmau̯kuf] is a village in the administrative district of Gmina Poświętne, within Wołomin County, Masovian Voivodeship, in east-central Poland.
