= Żaki =

- Village
- Location within Poland
- Coordinates: 53°11′33″N 20°32′02″E
- Country: Poland
- Voivodeship: Masovian
- County: Mława
- Gmina: Wieczfnia Kościelna

Żaki [ˈʐaki] is a village in the administrative district of Gmina Wieczfnia Kościelna, within Mława County, Masovian Voivodeship, in east-central Poland.
