= Grzybowo-Kapuśnik =

Village in Gmina Wieczfnia Kościelna, Poland

- Village
- Location within Poland
- Coordinates: 53°09′39″N 20°31′47″E
- Country: Poland
- Voivodeship: Masovian
- County: Mława
- Gmina: Wieczfnia Kościelna

Grzybowo-Kapuśnik [ɡʐɨˈbɔvɔ kaˈpuɕnik] is a village in the administrative district of Gmina Wieczfnia Kościelna, within Mława County, Masovian Voivodeship, in east-central Poland.
