= Szpak =

Szpak is a Polish surname. Notable people with the surname include:

- Damian Szpak (born 1993), Polish footballer
- Michał Szpak (born 1990), Polish singer
- Robert Szpak (born 1989), Polish athlete, who specialises in the javelin throw

== See also ==
- LWD Szpak, Polish utility aircraft of 1945, the first Polish aircraft designed after World War II and built in a short series
