= Stegna, Mława County =

Stegna
- Village
- Location within Poland
- Coordinates: 53°10′51″N 20°38′39″E
- Country: Poland
- Voivodeship: Masovian
- County: Mława
- Gmina: Dzierzgowo

Stegna [ˈstɛɡna] is a village in the administrative district of Gmina Dzierzgowo, within Mława County, Masovian Voivodeship, in east-central Poland.
