= Międzyleś, Wołomin County =

Międzyleś
- Village
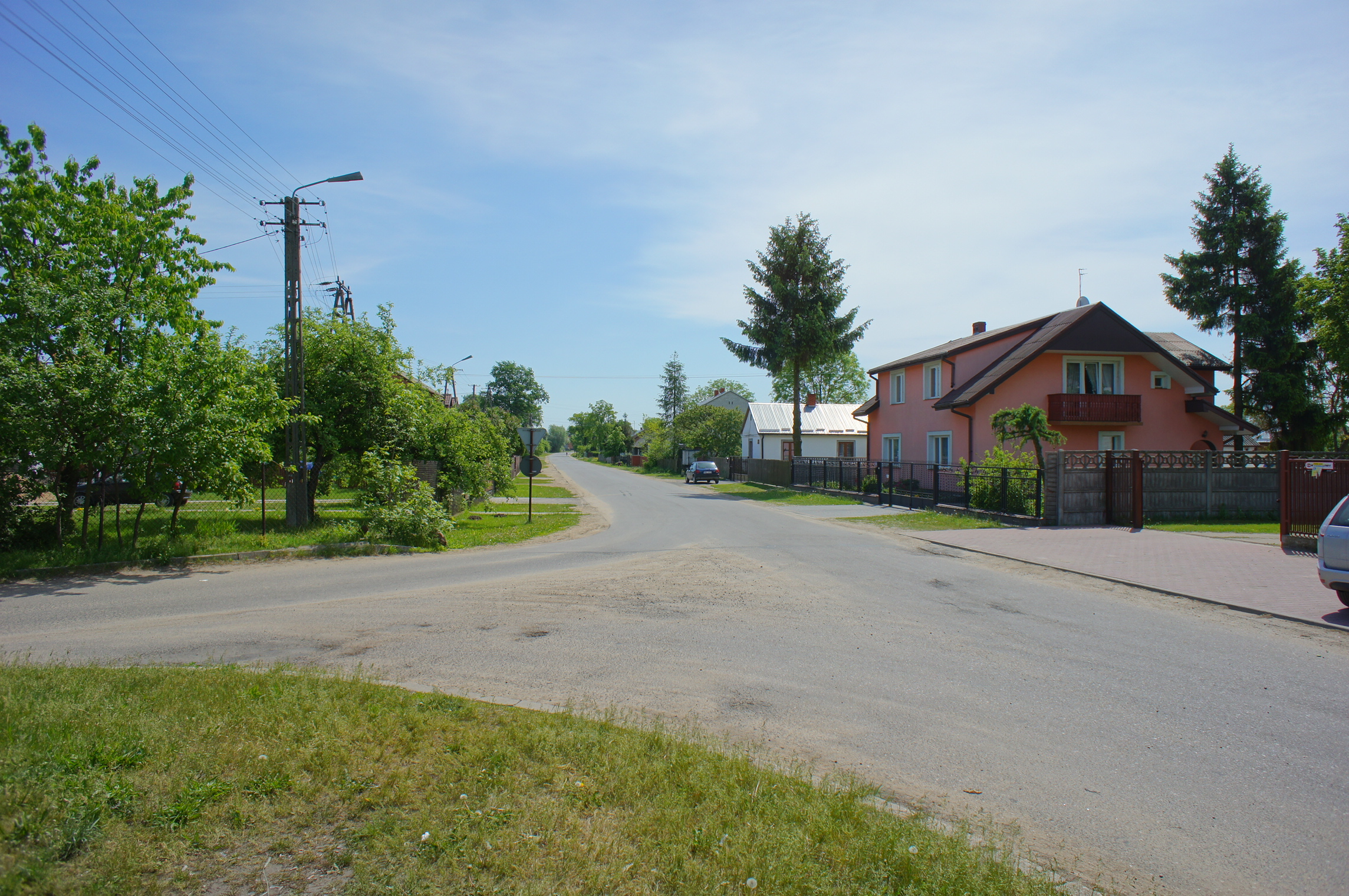

- Location within Poland
- Coordinates: 52°21′52″N 21°28′21″E
- Country: Poland
- Voivodeship: Masovian
- County: Wołomin
- Gmina: Poświętne
- Population: 650

Międzyleś [mjɛnˈd͡zɨlɛɕ] is a village in the administrative district of Gmina Poświętne, within Wołomin County, Masovian Voivodeship, in east-central Poland.
