= Bonisław, Mława County =

Village in Gmina Wieczfnia Kościelna, Poland

Bonisław
- Village
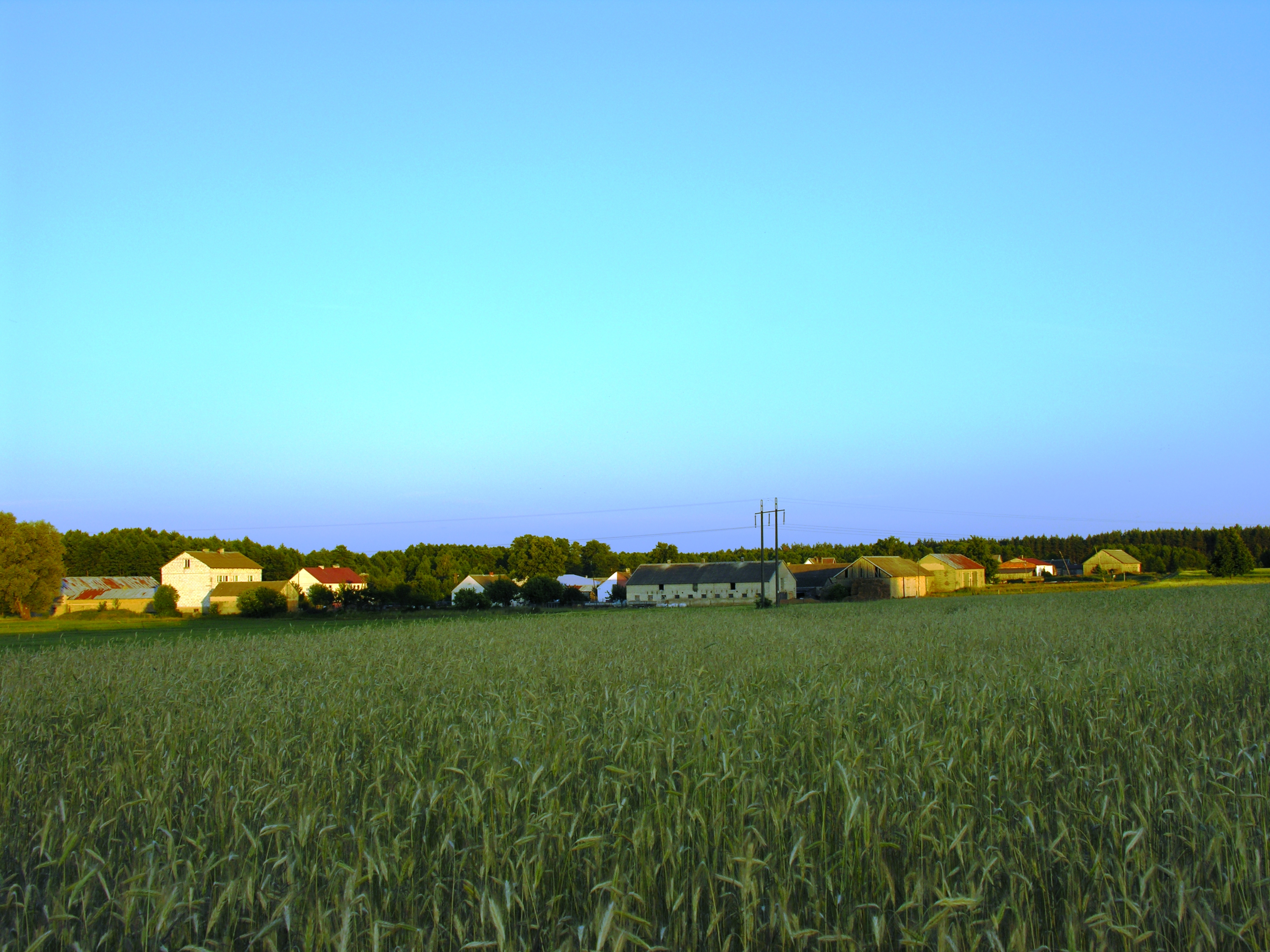

- Location within Poland
- Coordinates: 53°13′57″N 20°27′9″E
- Country: Poland
- Voivodeship: Masovian
- County: Mława
- Gmina: Wieczfnia Kościelna
- Time zone: UTC+1 (CET)
  - Summer (DST): UTC+2 (CEST)
- Vehicle registration: WML

Bonisław [bɔˈniswaf] is a village in the administrative district of Gmina Wieczfnia Kościelna, within Mława County, Masovian Voivodeship, in north-central Poland.
