= Działyń, Masovian Voivodeship =

Działyń
- Village
- Location within Poland
- Coordinates: 53°3′53″N 21°24′46″E
- Country: Poland
- Voivodeship: Masovian
- County: Ostrołęka
- Gmina: Olszewo-Borki
- Population: 110

Działyń [ˈd͡ʑawɨɲ] is a village in the administrative district of Gmina Olszewo-Borki, within Ostrołęka County, Masovian Voivodeship, in east-central Poland.
