= 38th Infantry Division (Russian Empire) =

- 38-я пехотная дивизия
- Active: 1865–1918
- Country: Russian Empire
- Branch: Russian Imperial Army
- Role: Infantry

The 38th Infantry Division (Russian: 38-я пехо́тная диви́зия, 38-ya Pekhotnaya Diviziya) was an infantry formation of the Russian Imperial Army.

== Organization ==
- 1st Brigade
  - 149th Infantry Regiment
  - 150th Infantry Regiment
- 2nd Brigade
  - 151st Infantry Regiment
  - 152nd Infantry Regiment
- 38th Artillery Brigade

== Commanders ==
- 1865-1868: Fyodor Radetzky
- 1869-1877: Arshak Ter-Gukasov
- 1916-1917: Józef Dowbor-Muśnicki
