= Rudolf von Freudenberg =

Imperial German Army officer

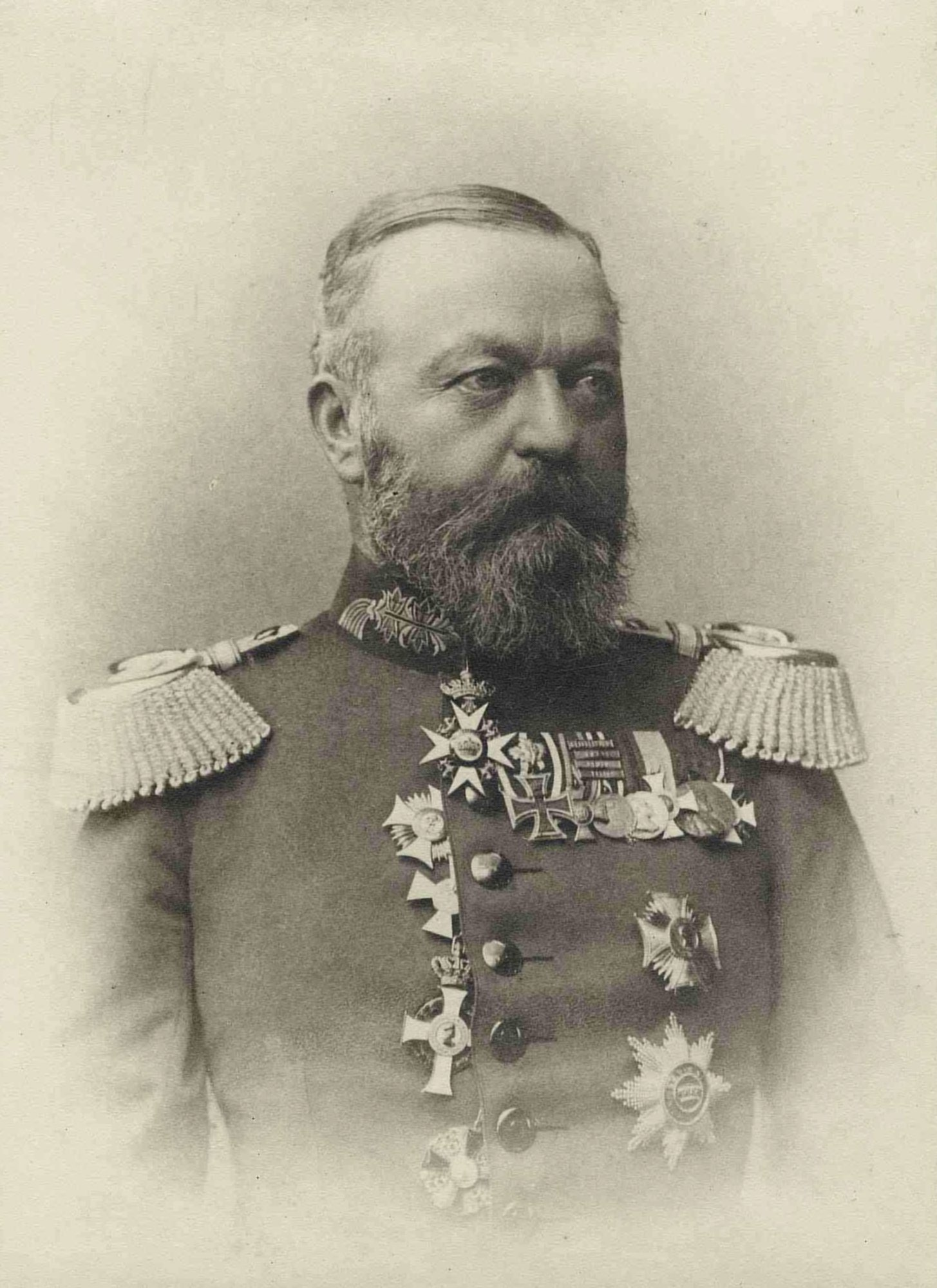
- Born: 19 August 1851; Kingdom of Württemberg
- Died: 17 March 1926 (aged 74); Baden-Baden, Germany
- Military career
- Allegiance: German Empire
- Branch: Imperial German Army
- Service years: 1870 – 1918
- Rank: General of the Infantry
- Commands: 11th Landwehr Division; 93rd Infantry Division
- Conflicts: Franco-Prussian War; World War I
- Awards: Order of the Württemberg Crown, Commander's Cross; Order of Frederick, Commander's Cross 1st Class; Albert Order, Commander's Cross; Order of the Zähringer Lion, Commander's Cross; Iron Cross, 2nd Class (1870) with Oak Leaves; Order of the Crown, 3rd Class; Order of the Iron Crown, 1st Class; War Commemorative Medal of 1870–1871; Centenary Medal of Kaiser Wilhelm I

Rudolf von Freudenberg (August 19, 1851 – March 17, 1926) was a General of the Infantry in the Imperial German Army. He served during the Franco-Prussian War and World War I, commanding several divisions and earning numerous military decorations.

== Biography ==
Rudolf von Freudenberg was born on August 19, 1851, in the Kingdom of Württemberg. During World War I, he held several key command positions:

- February 4, 1915 – November 20, 1916: Commander of the 11th Landwehr Division. On August 6, 1915, this division participated in the third general assault on Osowiec Fortress, famously known as the Attack of the Dead Men, where poison gas was used.
- November 21, 1916 – September 15, 1917: Deputy commander of the 17th Reserve Corps.
- November 21, 1916 – August 3, 1918: Commander of the 93rd Infantry Division, which took part in the German occupation of Ukraine during the Ukrainian War of Independence.

Freudenberg retired from military service after the war and died on March 17, 1926, in Baden-Baden.
