= Order of Saint George (Russia) =

Highest purely military decoration of the Russian Federation

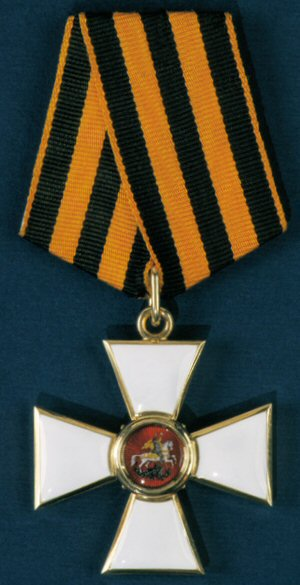
- The Order of Saint George, fourth class

Awarded by Russian Federation
- Type: Military order
- Established: 26 November 1769 (O. S.), revived on 20 March 1992 (the statute was approved on 8 August 2000)
- Eligibility: Top and senior military officers
- Awarded for: Distinction in combat
- Status: Active
- Classes: 1st, 2nd, 3rd, 4th

Precedence
- Next (higher): Order of Saint Andrew
- Next (lower): Order "For Merit to the Fatherland"
- Ribbon of the Order of Saint George, first class

The Order of Saint George (Russian: Орден Святого Георгия, romanized: Orden Svyatogo Georgiya) is the highest military decoration of the Russian Federation. It was originally established on 26 November 1769 (O.S.) (7 December 1769 Gregorian) as the highest military decoration of the Russian Empire for commissioned officers and generals by Empress Catherine the Great. After the October Revolution in 1917, it was awarded by the White movement under Alexander Kolchak until their collapse in 1921. The order was revived in the Russian Federation on 20 March 1992 by Decree No.1463 of the President of Russia. The current award criteria were amended on 7 September 2010 by Presidential Decree 1099.

== Statute of the Order of St. George ==
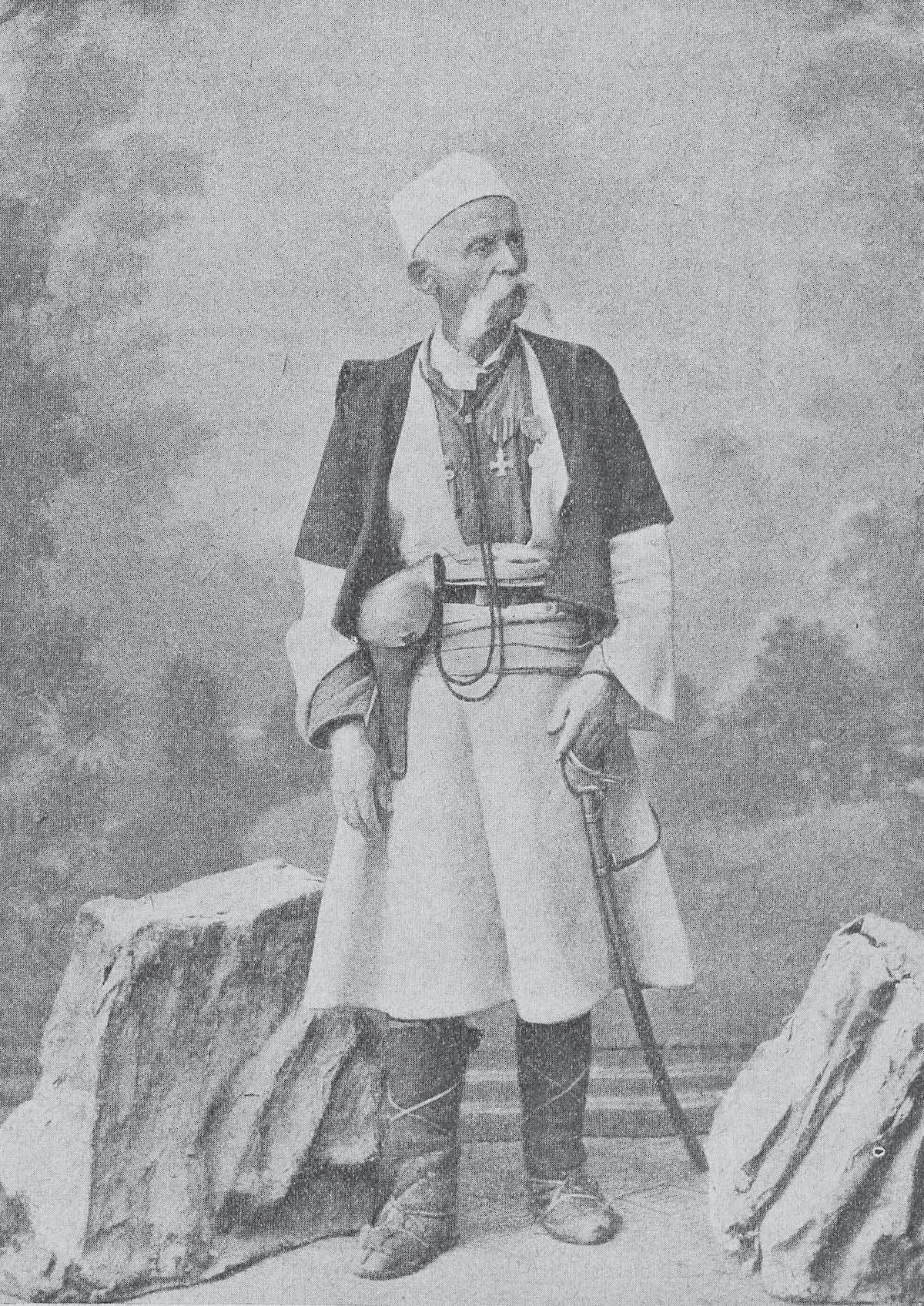
Georgi Pulevski wearing a cross of the Order of Saint George, conferred for his valiance in the Russo-Turkish War (1877–78)

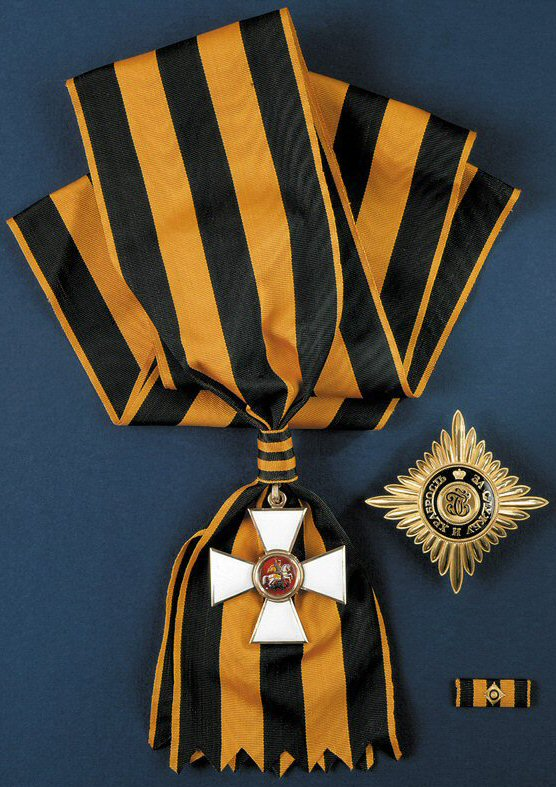
Order of Saint George, first class Breast Star and Sash

The current Order of Saint George is awarded to highest and senior military officers for the conduct of military operations to protect the Motherland from attack by an external enemy which resulted in the complete defeat of the enemy, for the execution of combat and other operations in other states aimed at restoring international peace and security, or for being a model of military science with feats that exemplify military prowess; the Order is also conferred upon officers who were previously awarded state awards of the Russian Federation for distinction in combat.

== Description ==
The Order of Saint George is divided into four classes, from the First Class to the Fourth class; the highest degree being the Order First class. The four classes are awarded sequentially from the fourth to the first. These four classes are individually identified by the size and manner of wearing the two principal insignia of the Order, the cross and the star.

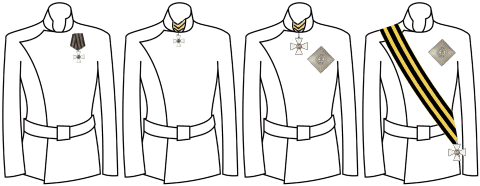
Proper wear of the Order of Saint George insignia, fourth class at left to first class at right

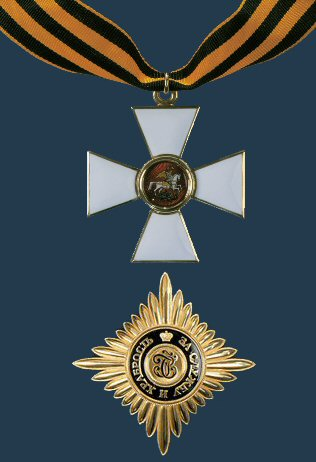
Order of Saint George, second class, neck badge and breast star

Cross: A white enamelled cross pattée with a central medallion bearing the image of Saint George on horseback slaying the dragon. The cross measures 60 mm across in the case of the Order First Class and is worn on a sash in the colours of Saint George (orange and black). The same 60 mm cross is worn around the neck on a 45-mm-wide ribbon also in the colours of Saint George for the Order second class. The cross is 50 mm across for the Order third class and is also worn around the neck but from a 24-mm-wide ribbon in the same colours. The Order fourth class is a 40 mm cross worn on the left breast hanging from a pentagonal mount covered with a 24-mm-wide ribbon of Saint George.

Star: A four-pointed silver gilt star with a gold central medallion bearing the cipher of Saint George "SG" topped by a crown and surrounded by a black enamelled band bearing the motto of the order "For Service and Bravery" ("Za Sluzhbu i Khrabrost"). The star is worn on the left breast for both the Order first and second classes.

Ribbon: The ribbon of the Order of Saint George is orange with three black stripes, commonly called "George's Ribbon". It symbolises fire and gunpowder: the Russian colours of military glory, and is also thought to be derived from the colours of the original Russian imperial coat of arms (black eagle on a golden background). It was subsequently associated with the colors of the Russian and Soviet Guard units. Unlike the other classes, the Order of Saint George fourth class can be awarded to junior officers while the rest is for senior and flag officers.

The ribbon bar for the Order first class is adorned with a miniature golden star.
The ribbon bar for the Order second class is adorned with a miniature silver star.
The ribbon bar for the Order third class is adorned with a miniature white cross.
The ribbon bar for the Order fourth class has no device.

== Recipients (partial list) ==
=== Recipients of the Order first class ===
Twenty-four people were ever awarded The First class cross, one should be a King or win a war to receive it. The full list goes as follows in timeline order:

- Catherine the Great
- Pyotr Rumyantsev
- Alexei Grigoryevich Orlov
- Petr Ivanovich Panin
- Vasily Dolgorukov-Krymsky
- Grigory Potemkin
- Alexander Suvorov
- Mikhail Kutuzov
- Vasily Chichagov
- Nikolai Vasilyeich Repnin
- Michael Andreas Barclay de Tolly
- King Charles XIV John of Sweden
- Gebhard Leberecht von Blücher
- Karl Philipp, Prince of Schwarzenberg
- Arthur Wellesley, 1st Duke of Wellington
- Levin August von Bennigsen
- Louis Antoine, Duke of Angoulême
- Ivan Paskevich
- Hans Karl von Diebitsch
- Joseph Radetzky von Radetz
- Alexander II of Russia
- William I, German Emperor
- Archduke Albrecht, Duke of Teschen
- Grand Duke Michael Nikolaevich of Russia
- Grand Duke Nicholas Nikolaevich of Russia
- Pyotr Mikhailovich Skarzhinsky

=== Recipients of the Order second class ===
For The Second class one should win a Campaign. The first recipient was Lieutenant-General Plemyannikov for the Battle of Kagul, the last of 124 or 125, depending on sources, was either Nikolai Yudenich or Marshal of France Ferdinand Foch.

- Grand Duke Nicholas Nikolaevich of Russia (1856–1929)
- Admiral of the Russian Empire Fyodor Ushakov
- Generalissimus Russian Empire Suvorov Alexandr Vasilyevich
- Field Marshal of the Russian Empire Mikhail Kutuzov
- Field Marshal of the Russian Empire Barclay de Tolly
- General of the Army Nikolay Yegorovich Makarov
- Colonel General Alexander Zelin
- General of the Army Vladimir Boldyrev

=== Recipients of the Order third class ===
- King Leopold I of Belgium.
- Grand Duke Nicholas Nikolaevich of Russia (1856–1929)
- Adjutant General Huseyn Khan Nakhichevanski (1914)
- Field Marshal of the Russian Empire Mikhail Kutuzov
- Field Marshal of the Russian Empire Barclay de Tolly
- General Alexei Brusilov
- General Yevgeni Iskritsky
- General Samad bey Mehmandarov
- General of the Army Sergey Surovikin
- General Pavel Liprandi
- Private George Phillips (Newfoundland Regiment) Beaumont Hamel

=== Recipients of the Order fourth class ===
- Nicholas II of Russia
- Adjutant General Huseyn Khan Nakhichevanski (1907)
- Lieutenant General, Baron Johan Fredrik Gustaf Aminoff (Battle of Sheynovo, 1878)
- General Alexei Brusilov
- General Yevgeni Iskritsky
- Vladimir Gittis, Imperial colonel and Red Army general
- Colonel Lambros Katsonis, Greek 18th-century revolutionary
- Colonel General Sergei Makarov
- Lieutenant General Vladimir Shamanov
- Lieutenant Colonel Anatoly Lebed
- British Captain Albert Ball, World War I fighter pilot
- Dutch War Correspondent Louis Grondijs, World War I, White Army, Russian Civil War
- Major General Carl Gustaf Emil Mannerheim, Imperial Russia, WWI
- General Pyotr Nikolayevich Wrangel, Imperial Russia, World War I, White Army, Russian Civil War
- Brigadier John Alexander Sinton, Indian Army, WWI
- Field Marshal Franz Joseph, Emperor of Austria and King of Hungary
- Major General Hermann Christoph Gamper, Imperial Russian cavalry commander during the Patriotic War of 1812
- Sub-lieutenant Afrikan Spir (Battle of Malakoff, 1855)
- Baron Ivan Karlovich Staël von Holstein (1838)
- Baron Roman von Ungern-Sternberg
- Field Marshal of the Russian Empire Mikhail Kutuzov
- Field Marshal of the Russian Empire Barclay de Tolly
- Ilija Plamenac, vojvoda and military commander
- Field Marshal Živojin Mišić
- Sir John Elley, British officer in the Napoleonic Wars
- Bogdan Zimonjić, Serbian Orthodox priest, vojvoda, senator and military commander
- Anatoly Pepelyayev, White Russian general
- Lieutenant General Grigory Mikhaylovich Semyonov, Cossack-Buriat White Army General
- Royce Coleman Dyer, Canadian Army captain
- Major General Pyotr Mikhailovich Skarzhinsky, 2nd Bug Cossack Regiment
- Aslan ibn Shahmardan, khan of the Gazikumukh (Kura) Khanate
- 2nd Lieutenant Vladimir Kotlinsky, commander of the Osowiec Fortress during the Attack of the Dead Men
- Marshall of the Soviet Union Georgy Zhukov (as a non-commissioned officer in the Imperial Russian Army in World War I)
- Robert Quigg, British Army, 36th (Ulster) Division
- Field Marshal Herbert Kitchener, Field Marshal of the British Army
- Lieutenant Axel Gadolin, 1871 (later Lieutenant General)
- Russian major Charles Osipovich Ode-de-Sion, 26 November 1826 (later major general).
- Colonel Opochinin, Fyodor Petrovich at the Battle of Austerlitz.

== See also ==
- Cross of St. George
- Golden Weapon for Bravery
- Orders, decorations, and medals of Russia
- Ribbon of Saint George
