= 57th Infantry Division (Russian Empire) =

Infantry division of the Imperial Russian Army

- 57-я пехотная дивизия
- Active: 1914–1918
- Country: Russian Empire
- Branch: Imperial Russian Army
- Role: Infantry
- Engagements: World War I

The 57th Infantry Division (Russian: 57-я пехотная дивизия, 57-ya Pekhotnaya Diviziya) was an infantry formation of the Russian Imperial Army.

The famous 226th Zemlyansky Infantry Regiment was involved at the Battle of Osowiec Fortress.

== Organization ==
- 1st Brigade
  - 225th Infantry Regiment
  - 226th Infantry Regiment
- 2nd Brigade
  - 227th Infantry Regiment
  - 228th Infantry Regiment
