= 226th Zemlyansky Infantry Regiment =

Infantry regiment of the Imperial Russian Army

- 226-й пехотный Землянский полк
- Active: 1914–1918
- Country: Russian Empire; Russian Republic (from 1917)
- Branch: Imperial Russian Army; Russian Army (from 1917)
- Type: Infantry
- Part of: 57th Infantry Division
- Engagements: World War I; Battle of Tannenberg; Battle of Osowiec Fortress; Battle of Kowel

The 226th Zemlyansky Infantry Regiment was an infantry regiment of the Imperial Russian Army. The unit existed from 1914 to 1918. The regiment was famous for defending Osowiec Fortress, having carried out the "Attack of the Dead Men."

== Regiment formation ==
The unit formed in 1914 from personnel allocated by the 10th New Ingermanland Infantry Regiment in Kaluga. The unit was part of the 57th Infantry Division.

== Service ==
After the creation of the regiment in July 1914, it was attached to the 57th Infantry Division of the 1st Army of Paul von Rennenkampf. The first battle took place on 29 August. The regiment covered the retreat of Russian troops from East Prussia, preventing their encirclement. For their courage in rearguard battles with the enemy, fourteen servicemen were awarded the Cross of St. George, 4th Class. At the end of January 1915, the regiment found itself in Osowiec, taking the perimeter of the fortress under guard.

After leaving Osowiec, the regiment retreated to Grodno. During its defense, the soldiers expressed heroism, clearing the eastern part of the city from the enemy. On 19 August 1915, the officers and lower ranks of the regiment were subjected to a second gas attack. At the end of July and beginning of August 1916, the regiment took part in the Battle of Kowel, then in battles with the Austro-Hungarians near Ternopil. In December the unit was transferred to Romania to save Russia's new ally from defeat. The unit remained in Romania until the end of hostilities in December 1917, after which it returned to Russia.

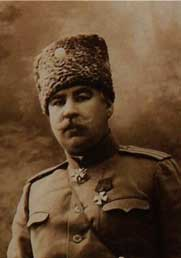
Colonel Konstantin Vasilievich Kataev

== Commanders ==
- 16 August 1914 – 11 November 1914: Colonel Dmitry Alekseevich Tolbuzin
- 22 November 1914 – 24 July 1916: Colonel Konstantin Vasilievich Kataev
- 25 July 1916 – 6 September 1916: Colonel Vr. and. Vasily Petrovich Potapov
- 7 September 1916 – 15 June 1917: Colonel Pavel Petrovich Gorev
- 4 July 1917 – December 1917: Colonel Alexey Tikhonovich Beloborodov

== Awards ==
- Aleksey Semenovich Gvozdenko
- Fyodor Semenovich Chernykh

== Notable figures ==
- Vladimir Kotlinsky
- Władysław Strzemiński
- Andrey Nikitich Novikov

== Commemoration ==
- On 6 August 2015, a monument to fellow soldiers of the First World War was unveiled in Pskov.
- On 6 August 2015, a memorial sign to the 226th Zemlyansky Infantry Regiment was installed in Zemlyansk in Voronezh Oblast.

== Sources ==
- Амельченко Ю. В., Михалевич И. А. Военные крепости России // Молодёжная политика — пути к реализации через толерантность, здоровый образ жизни, безопасность и традиционные институты общества. Военная история: вчера, сегодня, завтра материалы конференций. — СПб ГБУ ДМ «ФОРПОСТ». 2016. — С. 369–372.
- Бахтин В. В. 226-й пехотный Землянский полк в боях и сражениях Первой мировой войны // Русские не сдаются: забытые страницы истории Первой мировой войны сборник научных трудов. — Воронеж, 2016. — С. 148–164.
- Бахтин В. В. Роль 226 пехотного Землянского полка в обороне крепости Осовец // Первая мировая война: взгляд спустя столетие. 1915 год Материалы V Международной научно-практической конференции (26-28 ноября 2015 года, г. Москва). Международный независимый эколого-политологический университет (Академия МНЭПУ). — 2016. — С. 47–62.
- Бахтин В. В. Осовец : подвиг забытых героев // Битюгъ. — 2015. — No. 3. — С. 44–46.
- Боев А. А., Разумный В. В. «Атака мертвецов» 1915 года. взгляд с немецкой стороны // Развитие интеллектуально-творческого потенциала молодежи: из прошлого в современность Материалы I Международной научно-практической конференции. под общей редакцией С. В. Беспаловой. —Донецк, 2018. — С. 85 —86.
- Георгиевский М. М., Мухина Н. Е. Забытые герои Первой мировой войны: часовой крепости Осовец // Сборник трудов победителей конкурса на лучшую научную работу студентов и аспирантов ВГТУ. —Воронеж, 2016. — С. 21–22.
- Гусаров Ю. В. Русские хроники: оборона крепости Осовец в Первую мировую войну // Экономические стратегии. — 2012. — Т. 14. — No. 3 (101). — С. 52 — 61.
- Мокшин Г. Н. 226-й пехотный Землянский полк: история и современность // История: факты и символы. — 2018. — No. 1 (14). — С. 69 — 75.
- Мухина Н. Е., Георгиевский М. М. Забытые страницы Первой мировой войны: оборона крепости Осовец // Россия в зеркале военной истории Материалы II Международной научно-практической конференции к 70-летию Победы в Великой Отечественной войне 1941—1945 гг.. Центр нравственного и патриотического воспитания «НАСЛЕДИЕ». 2015. — С. 176–178.
- Неверов В. О. Оборона крепости Осовец // Война, народ, победа в исторической и культурной памяти. — Ставрополь, 2015. — С. 103–106.
- Пахалюк К. Оборона крепости Осовец // Свободная мысль. — 2016. — No. 2 (1656). — С. 43–58.
- Пивоварчик С. А., Калюта В. В. «Русский Верден»: Осовецкая крепость в годы Первой мировой войны // Веснік Гродзенскага дзяржаўнага ўніверсітэта імя Янкі Купалы. — Серыя 1. Гісторыя і археалогія. Філасофія. Паліталогія. — 2015. — No. 3 (203). — С. 53–59.
- Походня А. Н. Оборона крепости Осовец как пример героизма русского солдата в период первой мировой войны // История и обществознание. — 2016. — No. XIII. — С. 47–50.
- Смирнов А. Задыхались под Осовцом, умирали под Ленинградом // Родина. — 2015. — No. 9. — С. 48–50.
- Смирнов А. Атака мертвых // Родина. — 2015. — No. 9. — С. 44–47.
- Табакова З. П. «Атака мертвецов» и «огненный ангел» в истории и поэзии // Актуальные проблемы гуманитарных и естественных наук. — 2016. — No. 6-4. — С. 78–83.
- Чавриков И. Е., Щербинкин А. В. Атака мертвецов: крепость Осовец // 100 лет с окончания Первой мировой войны Материалы межвузовской научно-практической конференции. Под общей редакцией К. В. Костина. 2019. — С. 104–108.
- Черкасов А. А., Рябцев А. А., Меньковский В. И. «Атака мертвецов» (Осовец, 1915 г.): миф или реальность // Былые годы. Российский исторический журнал. — 2011. — No. 4 (22). — С. 5 — 11
- Чесноков И. В. Оборона крепости Осовец в 1915 году // Берегиня. 777. Сова: Общество. Политика. Экономика. — 2017. — No. 1 (32). — С. 92–101.
- Шевцова Н. М., Курлин А. А. «Атака мертвецов»: легенды и память Первой мировой войны // 100-летие Великой русской революции: сборник материалов всероссийских научно-практических конференций. 2018. — С. 160–162.
- Шендриков Е. А., Небольсин А. А. Героическая оборона русскими войсками крепости Осовец в 1914—1915 гг. // Гром побед и горечь поражений: к 100-летию Первой Мировой войны материалы международной заочной научной конференции. Воронежский государственный аграрный университет; редколлегия: Т. Н. Данькова (ответственный редактор), Ю. Д. Ченцов, Е. А. Шендриков. 2014. — С. 75–108.
- Щекочихин А. А., Корнаухов В. А. Осовец — «Брестская крепость» Первой мировой войны // Памяти протопресвитера Александра Желобовского: научно-краеведческий сборник. Череповец, 2016. — С. 58–60.
