= Nestor Buinitsky =

Russian engineer

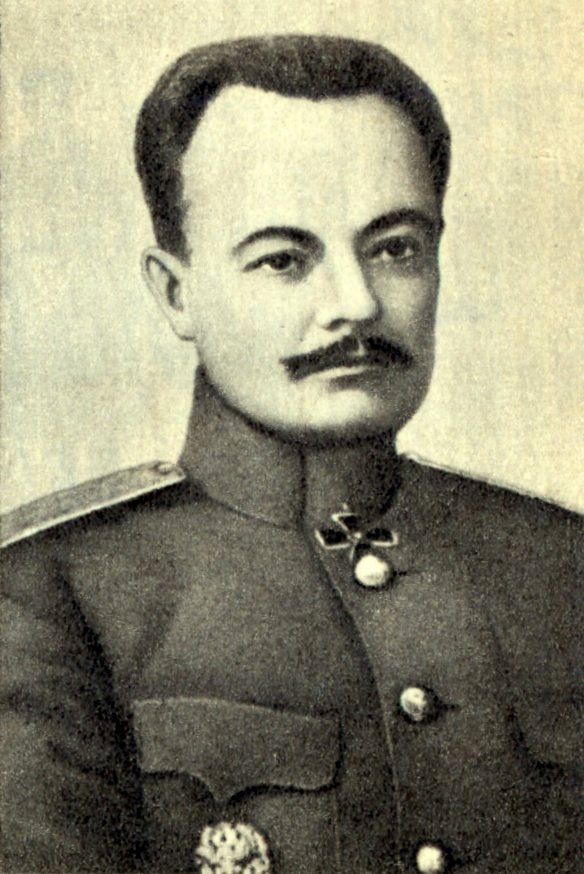
- Born: Nestor Aloizevich Buinitsky; 1863; St-Petersburg, Russian Empire
- Died: 1914 (aged 50–51); North-west, near St-Petersburg, Russian Empire
- Education: Military Engineering-Technical University
- Scientific career
- Fields: professor of fortification

Nestor Aloiziyevich Buinitsky (Russian: Нестор Алоизиевич Буйницкий, 1863–1914) was a Russian military engineer, professor of fortification, inventor and lieutenant general.

== Biography ==
Nestor Aloizevich Buinitsky was born in Saint Petersburg, Russian Empire, he studied at the 2nd Saint Petersburg Military School, and became a military engineer, after graduating from the Military Engineering-Technical University in 1889. He served as a military engineer at the Osowiec Fortress, where he would help in the construction of fortification buildings for four years. In 1893 Buinitsky began to teach about fortification in a native university, and became a professor. He co-operated with the Engineering Magazine, Military Collection, Artillery Magazine, Encyclopaedic Dictionary of Brokgauz-Efron, Encyclopaedia of Military and Marine Sciences, and the Military Encyclopaedia. In 1909, he became a member of the engineering committee, supervising creation of fortresses. His advanced studies have large value for the development of Russian fortifications, for example he was the supporter of the creation of integrated systems of fortifications. Buinitsky was known as a phenomenal expert on fortification, but he was also a talented writer. Buinitsky died in December, 1914.

== Bibliography ==
- "Engineering defensive of the state", St. Petersburg, 1907;
- "Modern position about long duration and temporal fortifications", St. Petersburg, 1903.;
- "Done early strengthening of strategic points" (St-Petersburg, 1893; translated into German for a magazine Mittheilungen über Gegenstände de s Artillerie und Genie-Wesens);
- "Influencing of innovations of armament for the field fortification" (ib., 1894);
- "Short theory of the field fortification" (1st edition, ib., 1897 г., 4th edition, ib., 1904);
- "Modern rules of long duration and temporal fortification" (ib., 1903; translated into German for a magazine Mittheilungen über Gegenstände des Artillerie und Genie-Wesens);
- "Notes about fortification of long duration" (1896);
- "Creation of seashore fortresses" (1899);
- "Problems of alertness of fortresses during creation" (for Military Collection, 1908);
- "Planning of forts in fortresses" (1908) the first reward of magazine the Engineering Magazine; for book Engineering Defensive of the State (1909);
- "Size and variety of garrison of fortress" (for Military Collection, 1909);
- "Minimum cost of fort" (the Engineering Magazine, 1909);
- "Navy fortresses" (the Engineering Magazine, 1911).
