= Military Engineering-Technical University =

University in Saint Petersburg, Russia

Coordinates: 60°00′26.41″N 30°22′22.66″E

- Военный инженерно-технический университет
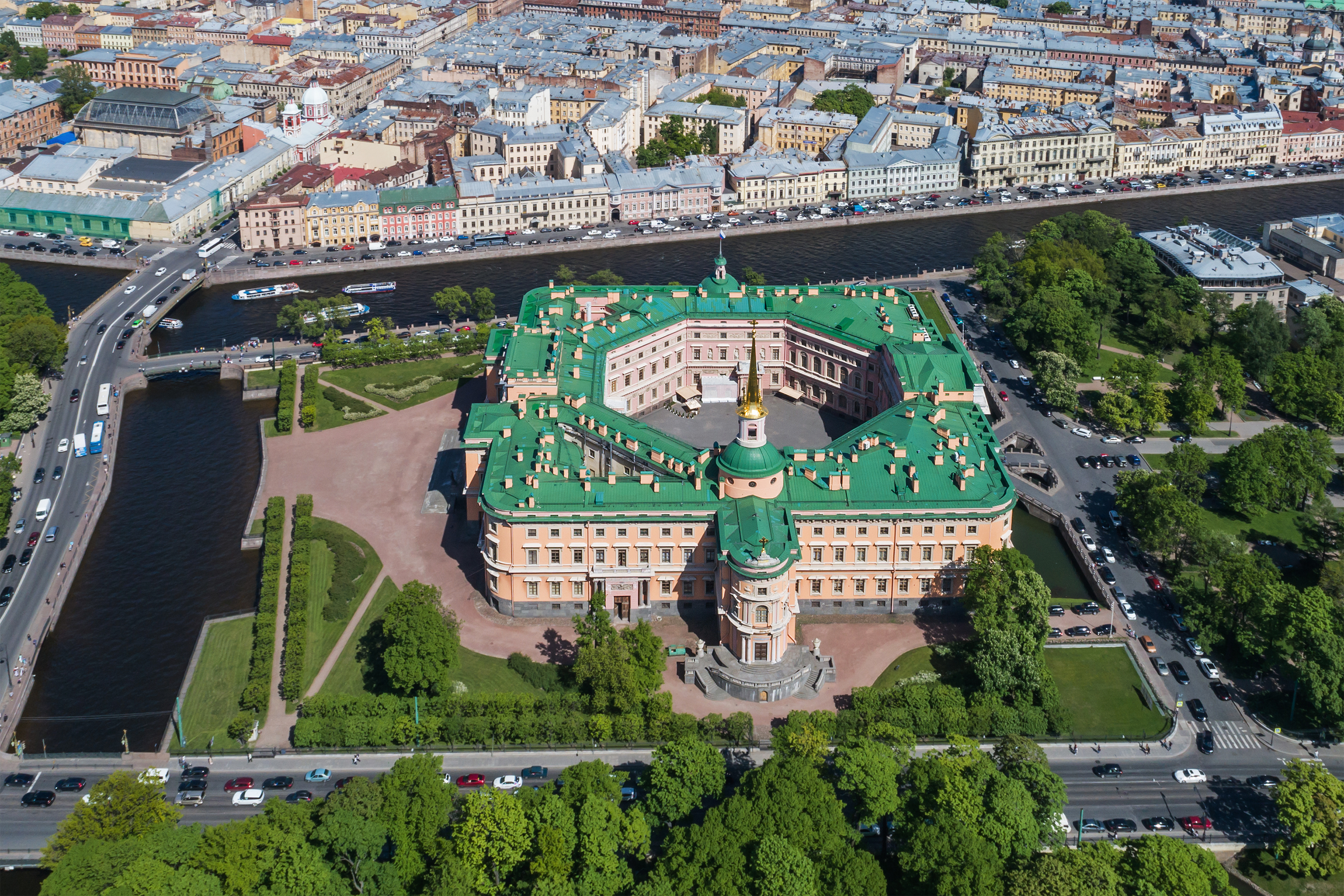
- Engineering castle. Main Military Engineering school since 1823, now a branch of the Russian Museum near VITU
- Motto: Spiritual force and engineering competence
- Type: Public
- Established: 1810; 216 years ago
- Rector: Nikolai Ivanivich Ludchenko
- Faculty: 43/Ph.D.300
- Students: 1500–2000
- Location: 22 Zakharyevskaya Street, Saint Petersburg, 191123, Russia
- Campus: Urban
- Nickname: Vitu
- Website: http://viit.vamto.mil.ru/

The Saint Petersburg Military Engineering-Technical University (Nikolaevsky) (Russian: Санкт-Петербургский Военный инженерно-технический университет, romanized: Sankt-Peterburgskiy Voennyy inzhenerno-tekhnicheskiy universitet, VITU), previously known as the Saint Petersburg Nikolaevsky Engineering Academy, was established in 1810 under Alexander I. The university is situated in the former barracks of the Cavalier-Guard Regiment where it was founded.

== Description ==
the Military Engineering-Technical University is a higher military educational institution preparing officers of engineering and building specialties for all branches of troops and navy. It is located in Saint Petersburg where the university was founded, near Engineers Castle, the Summer Garden, Suvorov Museum, Tauride Palace, and Smolny Convent.

Military Engineering-Technical University has six faculties preparing specialists in the following branches:

- Military construction,
- Military energy resource engineering,
- Naval base construction,
- Sanitary engineering,
- Mechanization of construction,
- Special courses for civilians.

The university trains experts in the field of construction of buildings and special structures, engineering and technical systems and power industry. It has an experimental base for testing various thermal-mechanical and power equipment, structures and construction materials, and carries out research and development activities. It provides military university trained officers for all the Engineering Troops of Russia, a counterpart of the U.S. Army Corps of Engineers.

== History ==
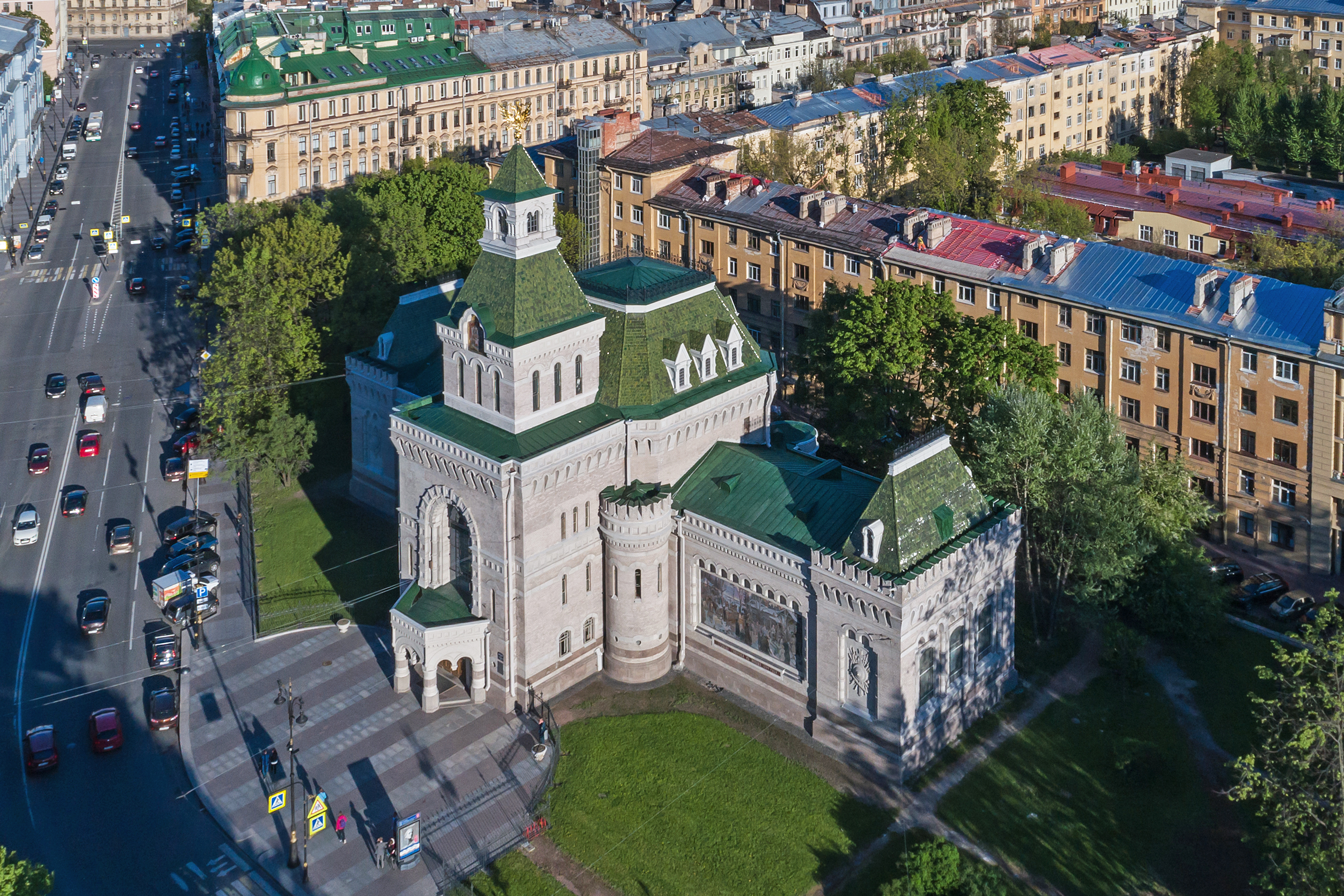
Suvorov Military Memorial Museum near VITU

This is one of Saint Petersburg's oldest higher military engineering schools, with its history as a higher learning institution beginning in 1810. The Saint Petersburg Military Engineering-Technical University was founded as the Saint Petersburg Military Engineering School in 1810 on the foundation of the military school of engineering conductors (engineering non-commissioned officers), after the addition of officer classes and the implementation of a five-year teaching term. In 1819, it was renamed as the Main Military Engineering School. As Stephen Timoshenko wrote in the book Engineering Education in Russia, the five-year system of higher education developed by the Main Military Engineering School was later adopted across Russia, using the example of the Institute of Railway Engineers, and continues to develop today. This engineering school was the alma mater of graduate Fyodor Dostoyevsky. In 1855, the officer classes of the Nikolaevsky Engineering School were reformed as the Nikolaevsky Engineering Academy.

After 1917, numerous transformations of the Nikolaevsky Engineering Academy and Engineering School were undertaken (but the higher learning institution survived). It was renamed as the Military-Engineering Academy, and then as the Military-Technical Academy. However, in 1932, an unsuccessful attempt was made to move the Engineering Faculty to Moscow; the move was completed later when the Sea Faculty returned to Leningrad in 1939. (As a result, a new Moscow Military Engineering-Administrative Academy was separated from the original Saint Petersburg higher learning institution). Only Nikolay Gerasimovich Kuznetsov could counteract Joseph Stalin`s policy against the Nikolaevsky Engineering Academy and School in 1939. He ordered that the university be revived, and that the Marine Engineering faculty be returned from Moscow. The attempts at bureaucratic moves (or Stalin's unfavorable attitude, 1932–1939) regarding the Saint Petersburg High School of Military Engineers can be examined in the historical context of the "Military Case" and the Great Purge, on the eve of the war against fascism. Also, Stalin's dislike of Fyodor Dostoyevsky was the reason for the unfavorable attitude against the university (because Stalin did not understand Dostoyevsky).

The pedagogical and scientific decline at the Saint Petersburg High School of Military Engineers had destructive consequences, but this was successfully corrected through the assistance of the Petersburg Polytechnical Institute. Nikolaevsky Engineering Academy was formally and legally reborn in 1939 as the Higher Naval Engineering Construction School on the base of the Leningrad Industrial Construction Engineers Institute (separate part of Saint Petersburg Polytechnical University), and expanded to include the Sea Engineering Faculty of the Moscow Military Academy. Higher Naval Engineering Construction School was renamed the Higher Naval Engineering Technical School. Leonid Kantorovich became a professor at the Military Engineering-Technical University, previously known as the Nikolaevsky Engineering Academy, when it was revived on part of the site of the Polytechnical Institute.

Academician Boris Galerkin donned a general's uniform in 1939, becoming a lieutenant general as the head of VITU's structural mechanics department. In September 1960, VITU university was called the Order of the Red Banner Higher Military Engineering School and became part of the construction troops. In 1974, the university was named after A.N. Komarovsky. In 1993, the university was reformed as the Military Engineering-Technical Institute, which received its present-day name in 1997 after merging with the Pushkin Higher Military Engineering Construction School.

=== The Second World War ===
Military Engineering-Technical University directly took part in World War II. The graduating students of the university fought heroically at all fronts of that war. They showed spiritual force and quality of engineering competence. The forts and numerous fortification buildings were established by the university's graduates, all of which played a vital part in defense (for example, the Brest Fortress). The unique Krasnaya Gorka fort was constructed by VITU graduates at the beginning of the 20th century, featuring 12-inch guns installed in concrete casemates. The system of forts played a key part in the Siege of Leningrad. As commanders of the Krasnaya Gorka fort, VITU graduates successfully stopped the fascist offensive in 1941. During the Siege of Leningrad, Boris Galerkin was the head of the city engineering defence department experts group. Also, he joined the military engineering commission of the Academy of Sciences. Hard non-stop work was undermining his health. Not long after the Victory, in July 1945, Galerkin died. Leonid Kantorovich was the professor of the VITU of the Navy, and there he was in charge of safety on the Road of Life; for his feat and courage he was awarded the Order of the Patriotic War.

== Traditions of Saint Petersburg High School of Military Engineers ==
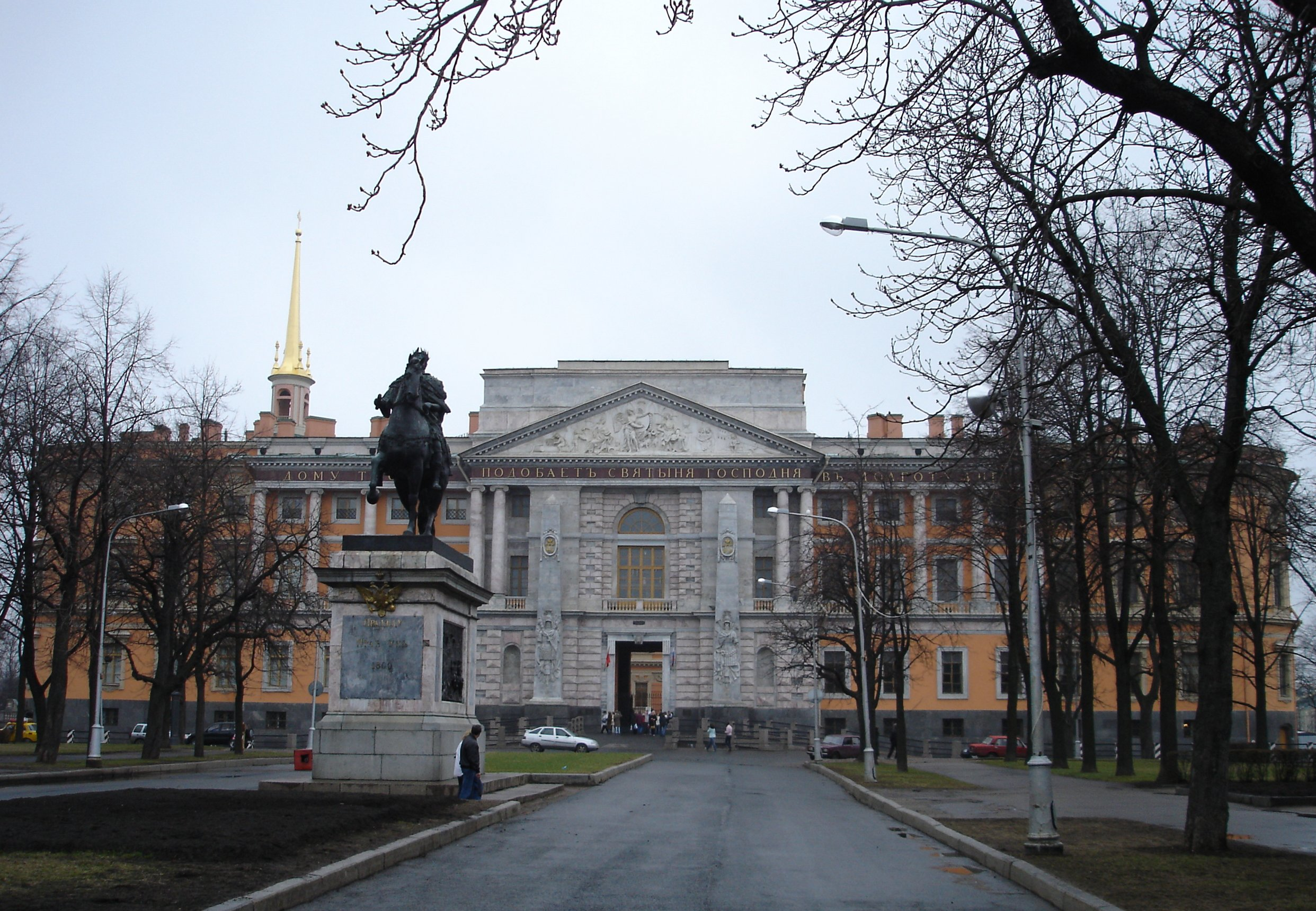
Engineers Castle (southern façade) with the Monument to Peter I in the foreground, favourite place of VITU's cadets

Military Engineering-Technical University prolongs, saves and develops the scientific and pedagogical traditions of Saint Petersburg High (higher learning institution) School of Military Engineers, the Nikolaevsky Engineering Academy and Nikolaevsky Engineering School, in the place of its own historical motherland.

== Alumni and faculty ==
In total, the university trained more than 45,000 military engineers. Among its alumni and faculty are:

- Leonid Artamonov, a Russian general, geographer, traveler, and military adviser to Menelik II; as one of the volunteer Russian officers, he was attached to the forces of Ras Tessema and authored Through Ethiopia to the White Nile.
- Alexander Vegener (Russian: Вегенер, Александр Николаевич), a Russian military pilot, engineer, aircraft designer, chief of the main air field, first chief of Zhukovsky Air Force Engineering Academy
- Konstantin Velichko (Russian: Величко, Константин Иванович), — a Russian/Soviet general military engineer, professor of fortification and author of numerous fortifications projects, for example the Red hill fort
- Boris Galerkin, a Russian/Soviet mathematician and engineer
- Dmitry Grigorovich, a Russian writer
- Fyodor Dostoyevsky, a Russian writer and essayist
- Alexander Dutov, a lieutenant general and one of the leaders of the Cossack counterrevolution
- Dmitry Karbyshev, a Red Army general and Hero of the Soviet Union (posthumously) who was taken prisoner during World War II, tortured by the Nazis, and died on February 17, 1945, in the concentration camp at Mauthausen
- Leonid Kapitsa (Russian: Капица, Леонид Петрович), was father for nobel laureate Pyotr Kapitsa, a Russian general military engineer, oversaw Kronstadt's forts construction
- Konstantin von Kaufman, the first governor-general of Russian Turkestan
- Amanullah Jahanbani, an Iranian senior general and senator.
- Leonid Kantorovich, a winner of the Nobel Prize in Economics, a Russian mathematician and economist, known for his theory and development of techniques for the optimal allocation of resources
- Roman Kondratenko, a Russian general famous for his steadfast defense of Port Arthur (now Lüshunkou) during the Russo-Japanese War
- Vladimir Korguzalov (Russian: Коргузалов, Владимир Леонидович), a Hero of the Soviet Union chief of engineers, major of Guard troops of 47th army of Voronezh front
- Alexander Kvist (Russian: Квист, Александр Ильич), a Russian military engineer of fortification
- César Cui, an army officer and a teacher of fortifications, as well as a composer and music critic, known as a member of The Five, the group of Russian composers under the leadership of Mily Balakirev dedicated to the production of a specifically Russian type of music
- Dmitri Dmitrievich Maksutov (1896–1964), a Russian/Soviet optical engineer and amateur astronomer. He is best known as the inventor of the Maksutov telescope.
- Alexander Lukomsky, a Russian military commander, General Staff, Lieutenant-General (April 1916) who fought for the Imperial Russian Army during the First World War and was one of the organizers of the Volunteer army during the Russian Civil War.
- Vladimir May-Mayevsky, a Russian army general and one of the leaders of the counterrevolutionary White movement during the Russian Civil War
- Dmitri Mendeleev, a Russian chemist and inventor, credited as the creator of the periodic table of elements
- Boris Mozhaev (Russian: Можаев, Борис Андреевич), a Russian writer and friend Aleksandr Solzhenitsyn
- Grand Duke Nicholas Nikolaevich of Russia (1856–1929)
- Mikhail Vasilievich Ostrogradsky, a Russian mathematician, mechanics expert, and physicist who is considered a disciple of Leonhard Euler and one of the leading mathematicians of Imperial Russia.
- Nicholas Petin (Russian: Петин, Николай Николаевич), a Red Army general, chief of engineers of Red Army
- Alexei Polivanov, a Russian military figure
- Ivan Sechenov, a Russian physiologist, named by Ivan Pavlov as "The Father of Russian physiology", who authored Reflexes of the Brain, introducing electrophysiology and neurophysiology into laboratories and teaching of medicine
- Eduard Totleben, a military engineer and Imperial Russian Army general who was in charge of fortification and sapping work during a number of important Russian military campaigns
- Baron Peter von Uslar a Russian general, engineer and linguist of German descent, known for his research of languages and ethnography of peoples of Caucasus.
- Pavel Yablochkov, a Russian electrical engineer, the inventor of the Yablochkov candle (a type of electric carbon arc lamp) and a businessman
- Shuliachenko Aleksey Romanovich (Russian: Шуляченко, Алексей Романович), a Russian engineer, general and chemist, known as the "grandfather of the Russian Cement"
- Golovin Kharlampiy Sergeevich (Russian: Головин, Харлампий Сергеевич), a rector of Saint Petersburg State Institute of Technology
- Nestor Buinitsky (Russian: Буйницкий, Нестор Алоизиевич), a Russian engineer, professor of fortification and lieutenant general.
