= Vladimir Kotlinsky =

Russian military commander (1894–1915)

- Владимир Карпович Котлинский
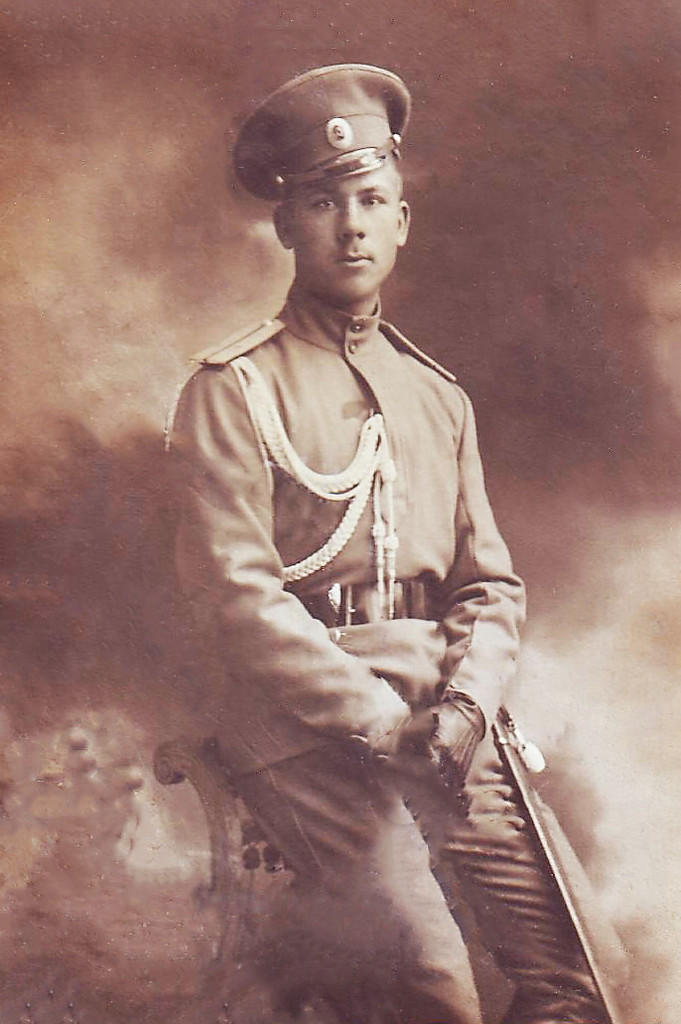
- Kotlinsky in 1915
- Born: July 22, 1894; Ostrov, Pskov, Russian Empire
- Died: August 6, 1915 (aged 21); Osowiec Fortress, Suwałki, Russian Empire
- Alma mater: Military Topographic School
- Military career
- Allegiance: Russian Empire
- Branch: Imperial Russian Army
- Service years: 1914–15
- Rank: Second Lieutenant
- Commands: 226th Zemlyansky Infantry Regiment
- Conflicts: World War I; Eastern Front; Attack of the Dead Men (DOW)
- Awards: See § Awards

Vladimir Karpovich Kotlinsky (Russian: Владимир Карпович Котлинский; 22 July [O.S. 10 July] 1894 – 6 August [O.S. 24 July] 1915) was a Russian Second Lieutenant and war hero during World War I. He was known for being the main commander during the famous Attack of the Dead Men as he led the counterattack of 60 to 100 men from the 226th Zemlyansky Infantry Regiment before being mortally wounded during the battle. He was posthumously awarded the 4th Class of the Order of St. George for his services in the battle.

== Childhood ==
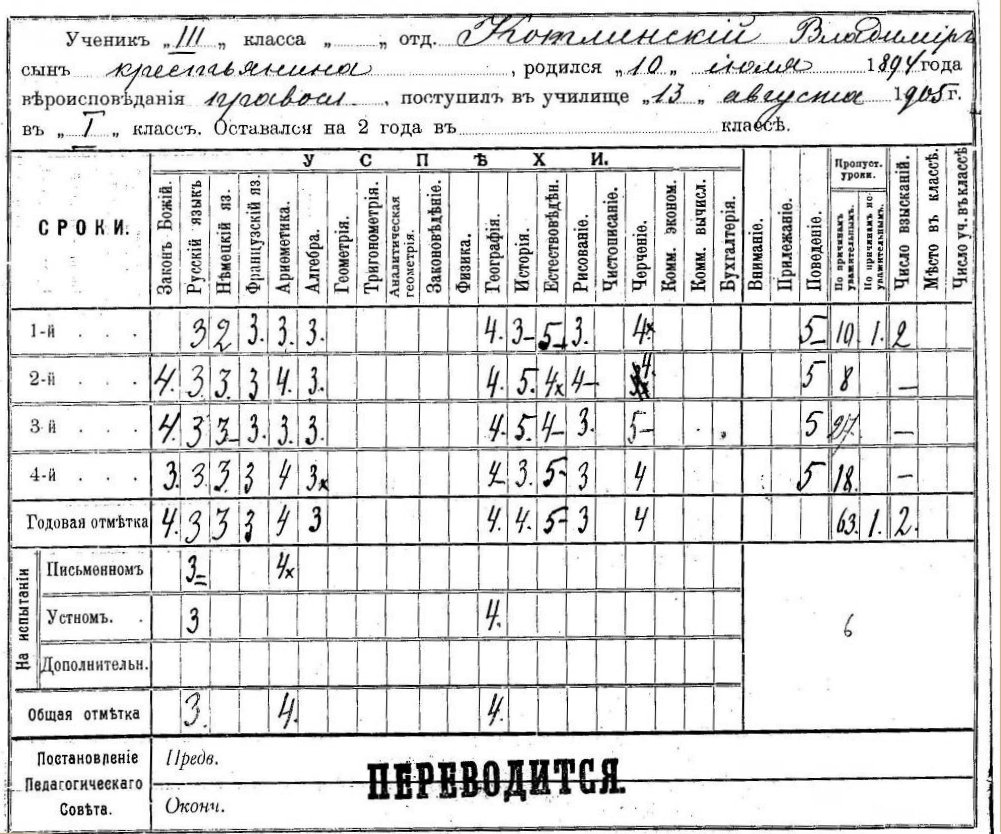
Kotlinsky's report card in third grade (1908)

Kotlinsky was born on August 3, 1894, at Ostrov. His father was a peasant from Verkaly, Minsk. His mother remained unknown but she was speculated to be Natalya Petrovna Kotlinskaya who was a telegram operator at the Pskov railway station. He also had a younger brother named Yevgeni (1898-1968). In 1905, he entered the Pskov Realschule and his third grade report card showed that Kotlinsky took interest in natural science and art with his lowest grades being Russian, German and French.

== Military career ==
After graduating from a Realschule in 1913, Vladimir Kotlinsky passed the exams at the Military Topographic School in St. Petersburg. In the summer of 1914, after his first year of service as a junker, they underwent standard geodetic practice near Rezhitsa in the Vitebsk Governorate.

On August 1, 1914, the day Germany declared war on Russia, is considered the first day of World War I. A month later, the school held an early graduation of junkers with distribution in parts. Vladimir Kotlinsky was assigned the rank of second lieutenant of the Corps of Military Topographers of the Russian Imperial Army with secondment to the 226th Zemlyansky infantry Regiment, which later became part of the garrison of the Osowiec Fortress. Despite this, not much is known about Kotlinsky's career prior to his service at the Attack of the Dead but the article The Feat of Pskov describes him as:

At the beginning of the war, a young man, lieutenant Kotlinsky, who had just graduated from the military topographic school, was seconded to the N regiment. This man seemed to have absolutely no idea what a sense of fear or even a sense of self-preservation was. Already in the past work of the regiment, he did a lot of good commanding one of the companies.

On July 24, 1915, he led the counterattack of the 13th company of the 226th Zemlyansky Infantry Regiment in repelling a German gas attack in what was known as the Attack of the Dead Men, but during the counter-attack, Kotlinsky was mortally wounded and died of his wounds that evening. On September 26, 1916, he was posthumously awarded the Order of St. George, fourth Class for his bravery during the attack:

For being seconded to the 226th Zemlyansky Infantry Regiment, on July 24, 1915, in the battle near the Osowiec fortress, when the Germans, with a force of about 5 regiments, using poisonous suffocating gases, occupied the part of the advanced positions left by us, realizing the danger of the situation, inspiring the lower ranks of his company, quickly rushed forward with it, with a bayonet blow he knocked the Germans out of the trenches they occupied and, with the support of private support, gradually knocking the enemy out of the trenches, restored the original position. At the end of this attack, Lieutenant Kotlinsky was mortally wounded.

== Legacy ==
On August 6, 2015, the "Monument to Compatriot Soldiers of the First World War" was opened in Pskov and Kotlinsky was featured within the monument as it "reflects the features of Vladimir Kotlinsky, a native of Pskov". A street in Pskov was named after Kotlinsky by the Pskov City Council on March 30, 2019.

== Awards ==
- Order of Saint Anna, 3rd and 4th Classes
- Order of St. George, 4th Class
- Order of Saint Stanislaus, 3rd Class with swords and bow
