= 11th Landwehr Division =

- 11. Landwehr-Division
- Active: February 5, 1915 - February 1919
- Disbanded: 1919
- Country: German Empire
- Branch: Imperial German Army
- Type: Infantry
- Engagements: World War I; Attack of the Dead Men

The 11th Landwehr Division (11. Landwehr-Division) was a unit of the Imperial German Army in World War I. They participated in the Attack of the Dead Men.

== Order of battle ==
=== Order of battle dated February 15, 1915 ===
- 33rd Landwehr Infantry Brigade
  - Landwehr Infantry Regiment No. 75
  - Landwehr Infantry Regiment No. 76
  - Landwehr MG Company No. 75
  - Field Machine Gun Platoon No. 25
  - Fortress Machine Gun Platoon / XX Army Corps
- 70th Landwehr Infantry Brigade
  - Landwehr Infantry Regiment No. 5
  - Landwehr Infantry Regiment No. 18
  - Field Machine Gun Platoon No. 13
  - Field Machine Gun Platoon No. 14
  - 3rd Landwehr Squadron/Guard Corps
  - 1st Reserve Squadron/XX Army Corps
  - 1st Landwehr Squadron/ IX Army Corps
  - 1st and 2nd Landwehr Field Artillery Batteries/IX Army Corps
  - 1st and 2nd Landsturm Field Artillery Batteries/ XVII Army Corps
  - Puttkammer Battery/Reserve Field Artillery Regiment No. 4
  - 7th and 8th Batteries/Foot Artillery Regiment “von Linger” (East Prussian) No. 1

=== Order of battle dated May 8, 1918 ===
- 33rd Landwehr Infantry Brigade
  - Landwehr Infantry Regiment No. 75
  - Landwehr Infantry Regiment No. 76
- 70th Landwehr Infantry Brigade
  - Landwehr Infantry Regiment No. 18
  - Infantry Regiment No. 424
  - Bicycle Company No. 780
  - 1st Squadron/Dragoon Regiment “von Wedel” (Pomeranian) No. 11
- Artillery Commander No. 131
  - Reserve Field Artillery Regiment No. 98
- Divisional Signals Commander No. 511
