= Attack of the Dead Men =

Battle at Osowiec Fortress during WWI

- Part of the Eastern Front of World War I
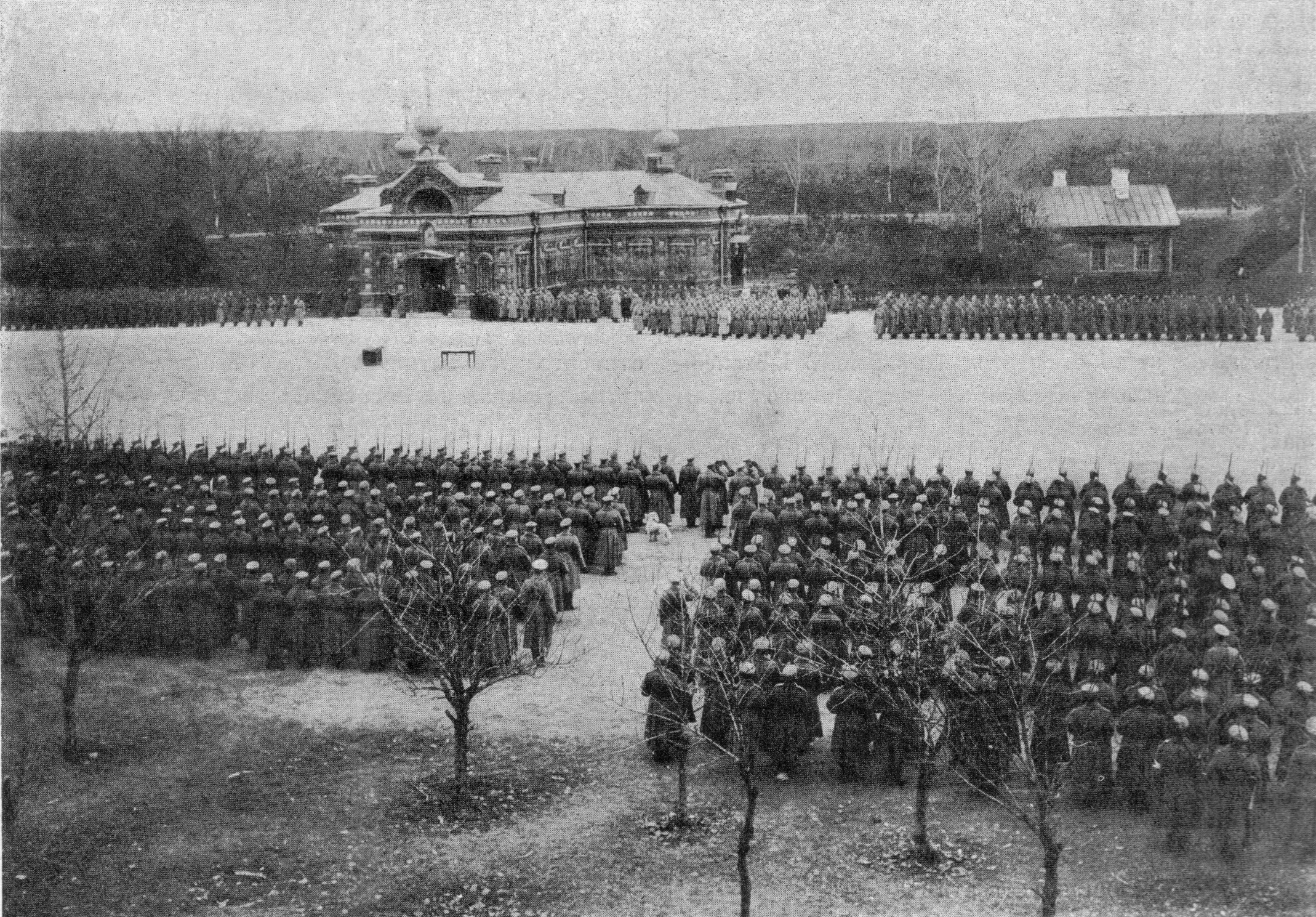
- The Russian garrison assembled at the Church of the Osowiec Fortress, 1915.
Date	August 6, 1915
Location	Osowiec Fortress, Congress Poland, Russian Empire (now Poland)
Result	Russian victory
Territorial changes	German forces routed and withdrew; Russian evacuation on August 18

Belligerents
German Empire	Russian Empire

Commanders and leaders
(German Empire) Paul von Hindenburg (German Empire) Rudolf von Freudenberg	Vladimir Kotlinsky (DOW); Władysław Strzemiński (WIA)

Units involved
(German Empire) 11th Landwehr Division	226th Zemlyansky Infantry Regiment

Strength
14 battalions; ~7,000–8,000 men	~900 men; 500 regulars; 400 militia; • ~60–100 in the counterattack

Casualties and losses
Heavy	~800 dead from gas (almost all present were wounded or killed)

The Attack of the Dead Men, (Note: German: Der Kampf der toten Männer; Polish: Atak umarłych; Russian: Ата́ка мертвецо́в, romanized: Atáka mertvetsóv.) or the Battle of Osowiec Fortress, was a battle of World War I that took place at Osowiec Fortress (in present-day northeastern Poland), at 4:00 AM on August 6, 1915.

The incident received its grim name from the bloodied, corpse-like appearance of the Russian combatants after German artillery had bombarded them with a mixture of poison gases, chlorine and bromine. While coughing up blood and often pieces of their inner organs, the surviving Russian soldiers covered their faces with cloths, counter-attacked, and routed the German troops.

== Background ==
The Osowiec Fortress, located 23 kilometers from the border with East Prussia, was strategically positioned to protect the vital corridor between the Nemen and Vistula-Bug rivers. First attacked by German forces in September 1914, the fortress was again attacked in February and March 1915. In early July 1915, under the command of Field Marshal Paul von Hindenburg, a third attempt to capture the fortress was undertaken as part of a wider German offensive.

=== Attack ===
The German command opted to employ chemical warfare, using chlorine and bromine gases to flush out the Russian defenders and ensure an easy capture of the fortress. By late July 1915, 30 gas artillery batteries had been deployed to the German front lines, each equipped with several thousand gas shells. The use of gas was intended to dispose of the Russian garrison, which lacked adequate gas protection or masks.

The final assault plan called for multiple infantry units to advance after the gas had dispersed. The 76th Landwehr Regiment was tasked with attacking Sosnya and the Central Redoubt, while maneuvering to cut off the rear of the Sosnya position. The 18th Landwehr Regiment and the 147th Reserve Battalion were assigned to advance on either side of the railway, coordinating their attack on the Zarachnaya position with the 76th Regiment.

Meanwhile, the 5th Landwehr Regiment and the 41st Reserve Battalion were ordered to assault Białogrony, penetrate the defenses, and storm the Zarachny Fort. In reserve, the 75th Landwehr Regiment and two additional reserve battalions were positioned to provide support for the 18th Landwehr Regiment's assault along the railway on Zarachnaya.

== Battle ==
=== German assault ===
At approximately 4:00 AM on August 6, German forces began a massive artillery bombardment, followed by the release of chlorine and bromine gases after waiting ten days for favorable winds.

A dense, toxic cloud drifted across the Russian positions, causing mass casualties among the defenders. The gas blanketed an area approximately 8 kilometers wide and 20 kilometers deep, devastating both the environment and the Russian garrison. Weapons and equipment corroded almost instantly, while trees withered and died upon exposure.

The 9th, 10th, and 11th Companies of the garrison were completely annihilated. Only a handful of soldiers from other units managed to survive the attack. Secondary gas clouds lingering over the battlefield claimed even more lives. From the 12th Company, only 40 men survived, while 60 defenders of Białogronda escaped death—but all were severely affected by acute chlorine gas poisoning. Of the original 800-strong Russian garrison, only 100 remained, and nearly all suffered debilitating effects from the gas. After the initial chemical bombardment, over twelve battalions of the 11th Landwehr Division, some 7,000 men, moved forward to occupy the supposedly abandoned Russian positions, expecting little resistance.

=== Russian counterattack ===
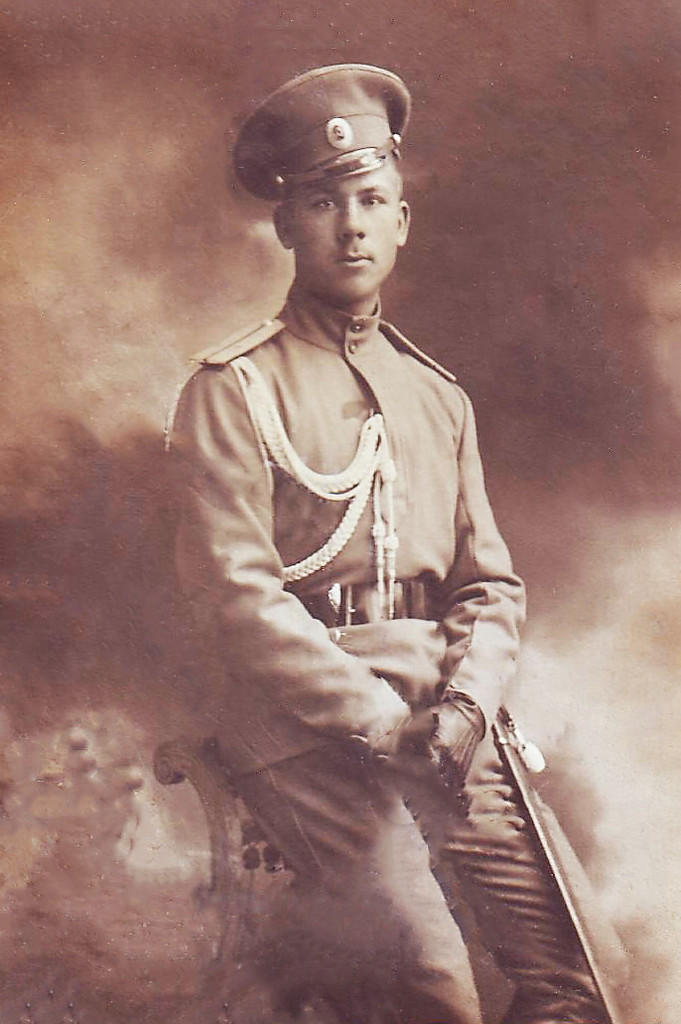
Lieutenant Vladimir Karpovich Kotlinsky, commandant of the Osowiec fortress during the attack.

The German troops encountered the first wave of Russian defenders as they launched a desperate counter-charge. These were the remnants of the 13th Company of the 226th Infantry Regiment—soldiers who had survived the initial gas attack. The Germans recoiled in horror at the sight of the advancing Russians, whose uniforms were bloodied. Many were coughing violently, expelling blood and fragments of lung tissue. The chlorine gas, reacting with the moisture in their lungs, had formed hydrochloric acid, which was slowly dissolving their organs.

The Germans fled from the second-line trench network in a mass panic and broke ranks with such haste that they were entangled in their own barbed wire traps while under Russian attack, resulting in many casualties. As the German forces fell back, the remnants of the Russian artillery battery concentrated their fire onto the first-line trench network, which was now occupied by the Germans.

The 13th Company, under the command of Lieutenant Kotlinsky, launched an assault on the positions held by the 18th German regiment along the railway, successfully forcing them into retreat. Lieutenant Kotlinsky was mortally wounded and was unable to continue leading the attack, and died later that night. Władysław Strzemiński then assumed command on instruction of Kotlinsky, leading the 2nd Osovetska Sap Company. Despite suffering from the severe effects of the lingering gas attack, Strzemiński rallied the remaining troops and led them in a desperate bayonet charge. Strzemiński pressed the attack, successfully reclaiming the 1st and 2nd sections of the Sosnenskaya position from the German forces. The German troops had been completely driven out of the Sosnenskaya position and were routing by 11:00 AM. The Russian defenders had repossessed the defences.

=== Aftermath ===
Despite the efforts of the defenders, the Russians were unable to stem the German advance. The fortress was now threatened with encirclement and the capture of Kaunas and Novogeorgievsk also took precedence. With little choice, the Russians demolished much of the area and retreated on August 18.

== Legacy ==
Russian metal band Aria released a song inspired by the battle, titled "Attack of the Dead", on their 2014 album Through All Times.

Swedish metal band Sabaton released a song about the battle, titled "The Attack of the Dead Men", on their 2019 album The Great War.

The video game World of Warships and its developer, Wargaming, produced a short film based on the events of the battle.

== See also ==
- Angels of Mons
