= Osowiec Fortress =

19th century Russian Empire fortress in Poland

Coordinates: 53°28′20″N 22°39′06″E

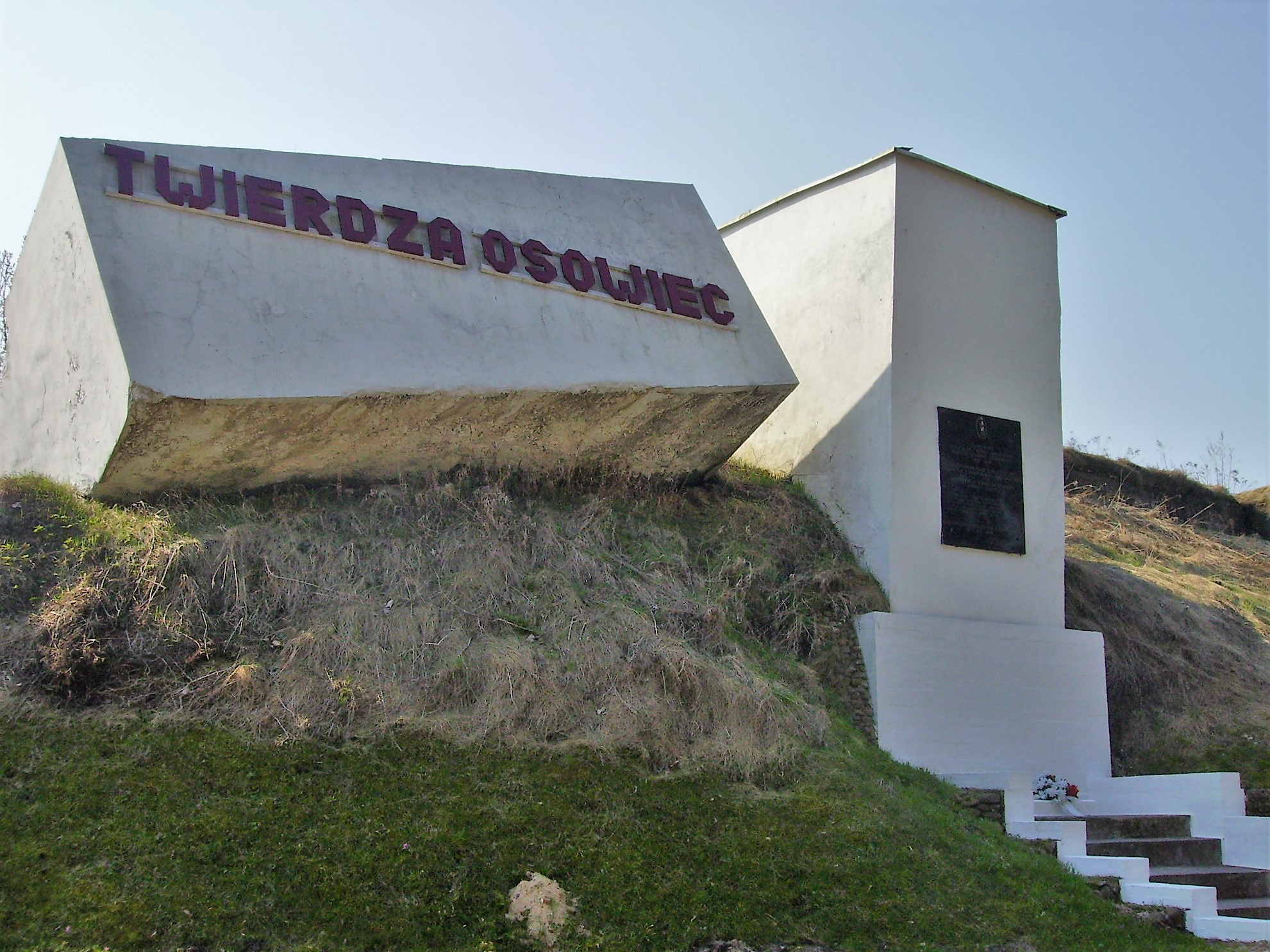
Monument in Osowiec Fortress

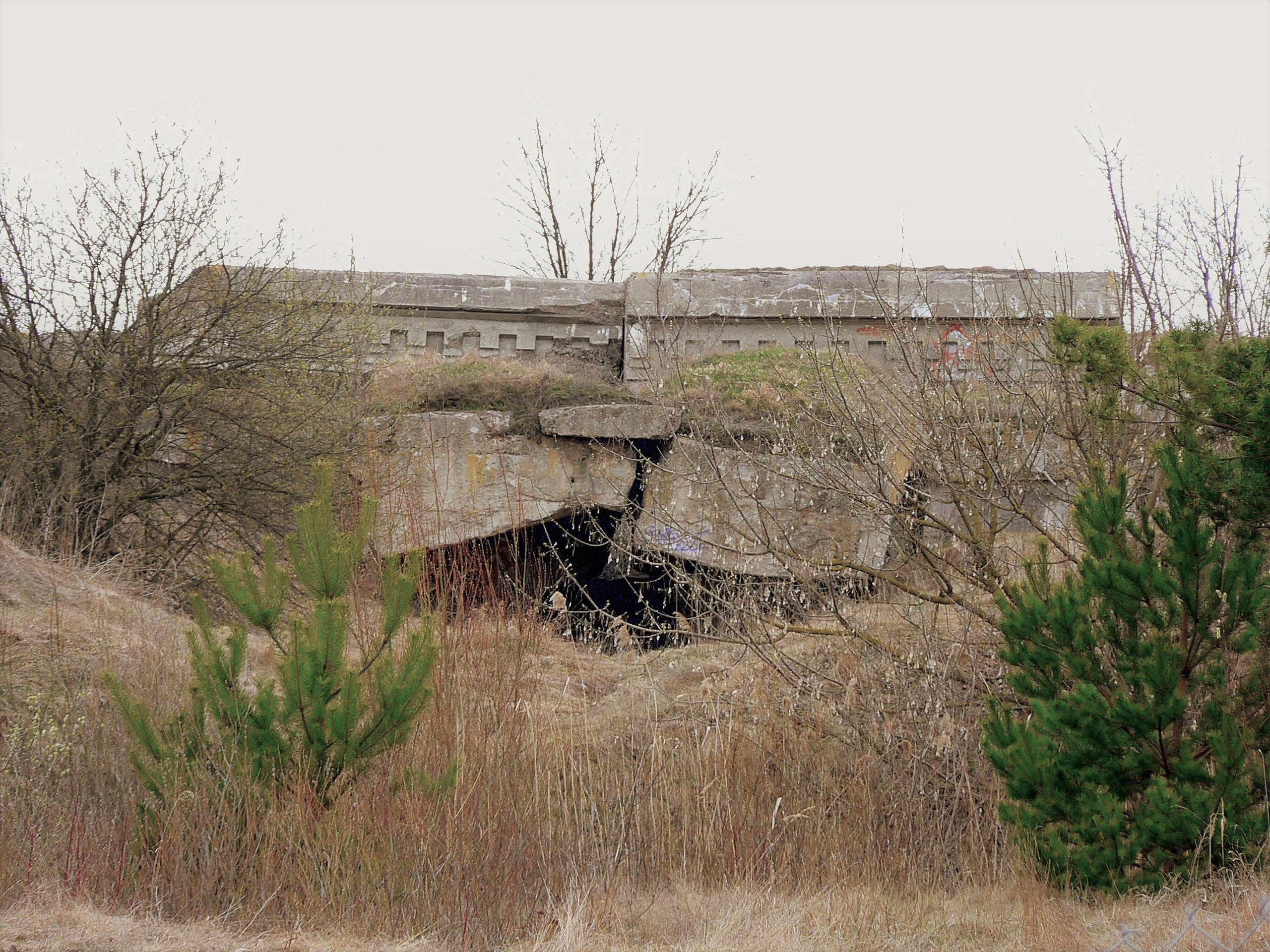
Fort II of Osowiec Fortress

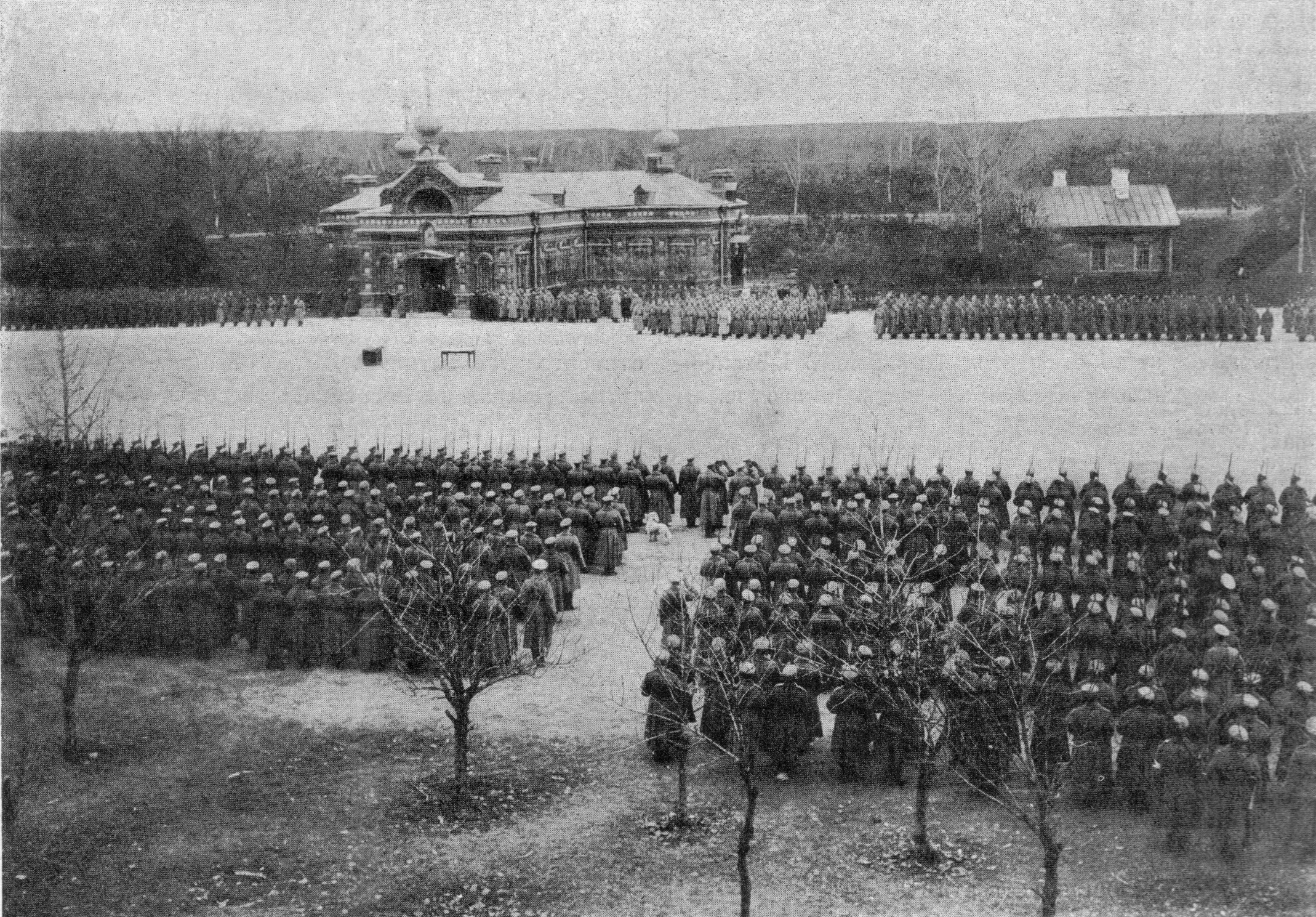
Soldiers outside the Osowiec fortress church, 1915

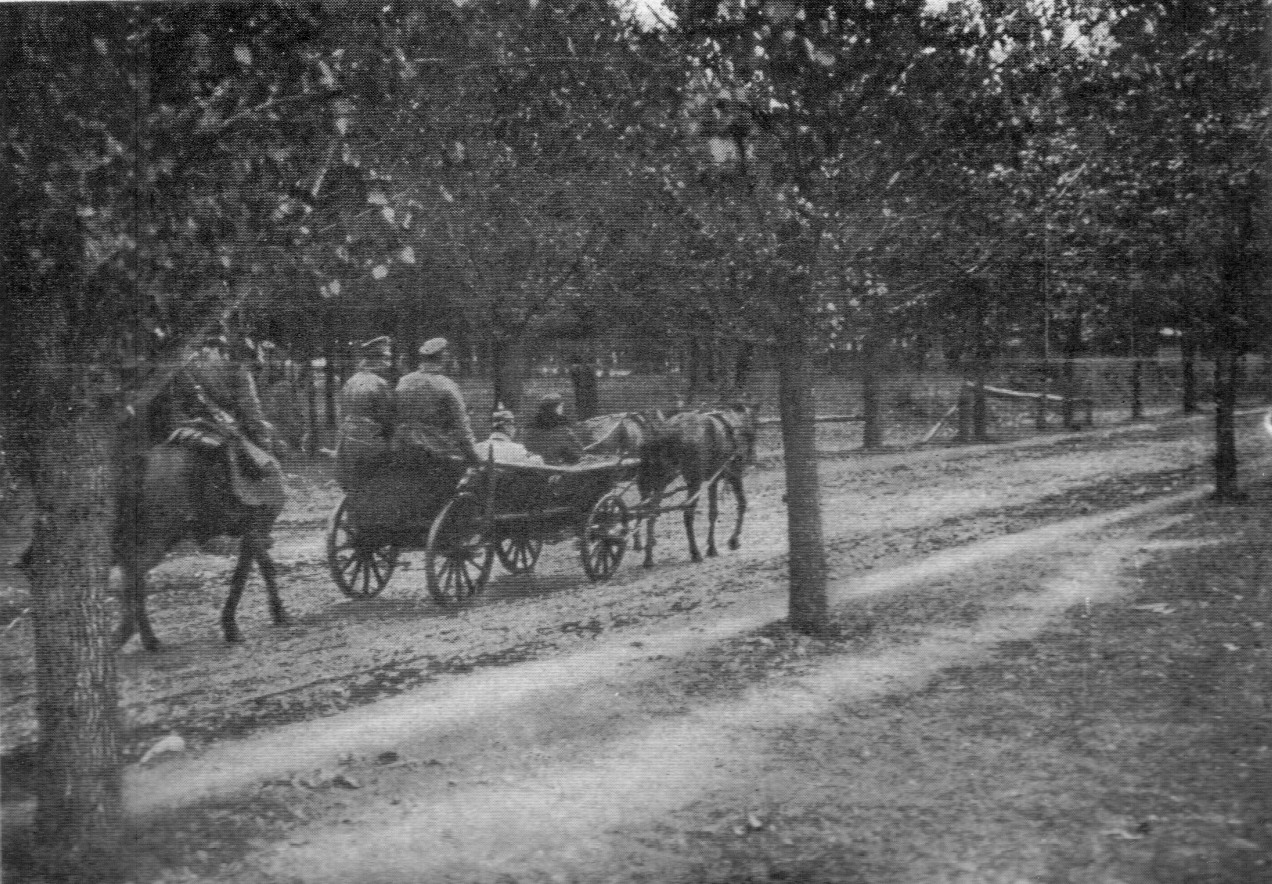
German officer taken prisoner in Osowiec fortress, 1914

Osowiec Fortress (Polish: Twierdza Osowiec; Russian: Крепость Осовец, romanized: Krepost' Osovets) is a 19th-century fortress built by the Russian Empire, located in what is now north-eastern Poland. It saw heavy fighting during World War I when it was defended for several months by its Russian garrison against German attacks.

The fortress was built in the years 1882–1892 as one of the defensive works to protect the western borders of Russia against Germany, and continuously modernised afterwards to cope with advances in heavy siege artillery. In 1889–1893, military engineer Nestor Buinitsky took an important part in the creation of the fortress. It was located on the river Biebrza about 50 km from the border with the German province of East Prussia, in the one place where the marshlands of the river could be crossed, hence controlling a vital chokepoint. The extensive marshlands and bogs that surrounded it made attacks upon it difficult. The strategic Belostok–Lyck–Königsberg rail line also ran through the fortress and crossed the Biebrza river there. The fortress saw heavy fighting during the beginning of World War I in the eastern front from September 1914 until the Russian Army abandoned it in August 1915. In the interwar years the fortress was used by the Polish Army. During the German invasion of Poland in 1939 it was bypassed and did not see much fighting.

Today, some parts of the fortress are accessible to tourists, especially the parts within the boundaries of Biebrza National Park. The visitor information center of the park is located in Osowiec-Twierdza, a small settlement located within the boundaries of the fortress. Other parts of the fortress still belong to the Polish Army and access is restricted.

== First World War ==
=== First German assault (September 1914) ===
In September 1914, Russian field defenses surrounding the fortress were attacked by 40 infantry battalions of the German 8th Army; the attackers enjoyed significant numerical superiority. By 21 September, the German advance brought the fortress proper within range of German artillery; further reinforced with 60 additional guns of calibres up to 203mm, but these could only be brought into action on 26 September. On the same day, the city was attacked, 8,000 garrison repelled the attack of 12,000 German army, losing 139 people, German losses up to 6,000. Two days later, a German frontal assault was repelled by Russian artillery. The day afterwards, two Russian flanking counter-attacks forced German artillery to relocate, taking the fortress outside of German artillery range.

=== Second battle (February–March 1915) ===
Attempting to cut the railway line between Białystok and Warsaw, the Germans attacked the Osowiec fortress, which was lightly defended by a few Russian battalions. Two days of heavy bombardment by the Germans commenced on 14 February, followed by a second bombardment during the last week of the month. However, German infantry attacks were repelled, and the situation devolved into positional warfare for the next several months.

It is sometimes incorrectly claimed that Russian counter-battery fire destroyed two German heavy mortars; these guns were withdrawn for operations elsewhere.

=== Third battle (July–August 1915) ===
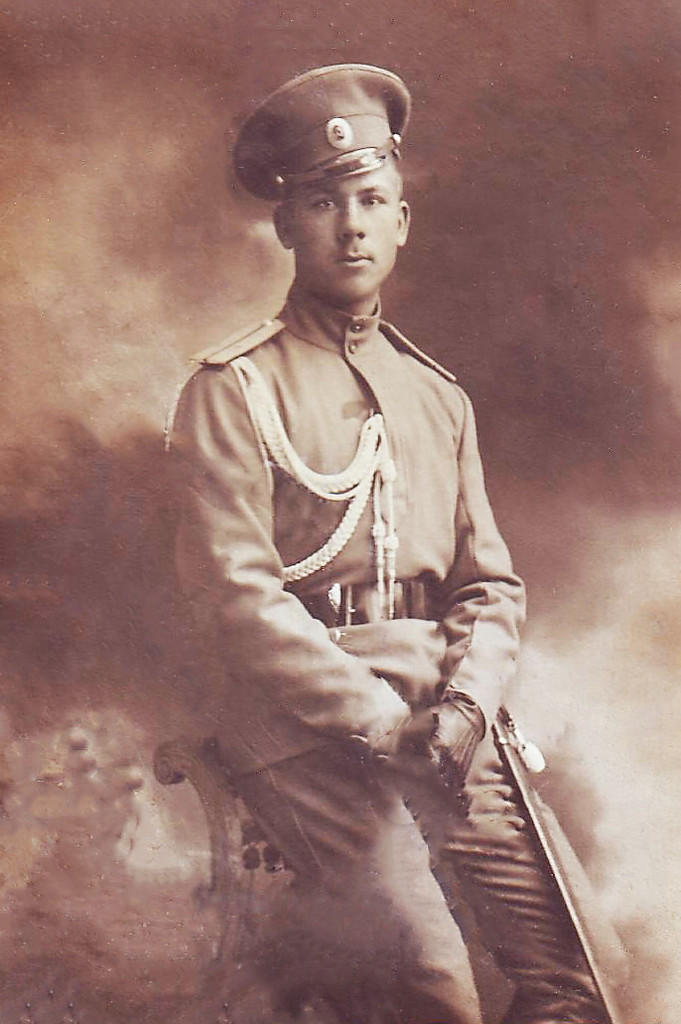
Lieutenant Vladimir Karpovich Kotlinsky, commandant of the Osowiec fortress during the attack

The Germans launched a full frontal offensive on the fortress at the beginning of July; the attack included 14 battalions of infantry, one battalion of sappers, 24–30 heavy siege guns, and 30 batteries of artillery equipped with poison gases led by Field Marshal Paul von Hindenburg. Russian defences were manned by 500 soldiers of the 226th Infantry Regiment Zemlyansky, and 400 militia.

The Germans knew the Russians did not have any gas masks so they chose to use chlorine gas. The Germans waited until 04:00 on 6 August for favourable wind conditions, when the attack opened with regular artillery bombardment combined with chlorine gas. The ensuing battle was known as the Attack of the Dead Men. The Russians put on wet rags on their faces to filter some of the gas. Most died but approximately one hundred men survived the gas attack. Even while suffering severe chemical burns the Russians were able to repel the attack due to German forces panicking at the sight of the Russian men, covered in blisters and coughing up bits of their lungs, with the Germans subsequently retreating. The Russian garrison suffered heavy losses, but some soldiers survived even after the final charge, and chlorine gas barrage. This offensive by the remaining Russian troops was dubbed the "Attack of the Dead Men", as the near deceased soldiers resembled the undead, still charging despite being badly injured.

The Russians did not hold Osowiec for much longer. The Germans threatened to encircle the fortress with the capture of Kaunas and Novogeorgiesk. The Russians demolished much of Osowiec and withdrew on 18 August.

== Second World War ==
After the First World War, the Second Polish Republic refurbished parts of Osowiec and used it to house Polish army units, including the Central School of Non-Commissioned Officers of the Border Protection Corps.

The 135th Reserve Infantry Regiment was formed from the school after Germany invaded Poland at the beginning of the Second World War. The Poles abandoned the fortress on 13 September. The Germans captured it and passed it to the Soviet 20th Motor Rifle and Machine Gun Brigade on 25 September. Osowiec was subsequently garrisoned by the Soviet 10th Army. The Germans recaptured Osowiec on 27 June 1941 during Operation Barbarossa; one use of the fortress was as an ammunition dump there. On 14 August 1944, the Soviet 49th and 50th Armies captured three of the forts during the Osovets Offensive of Operation Bagration. Fort II remained in German hands until January 1945, when it was abandoned during the Vistula–Oder Offensive.

== Post-war ==
In 1953, the fortress was regarrisoned by a Polish Air Force ammunition depot, which was absorbed into the 11th Regional Materiel Base in 1998. In 2011, the Osowiec garrison became part of the 2nd Regional Logistics Base.
