= Castle of Sesimbra =

Ancient castle in Sesimbra, Setúbal, Portugal

- Castelo de Sesimbra
- Setúbal District, Near Sesimbra in Portugal
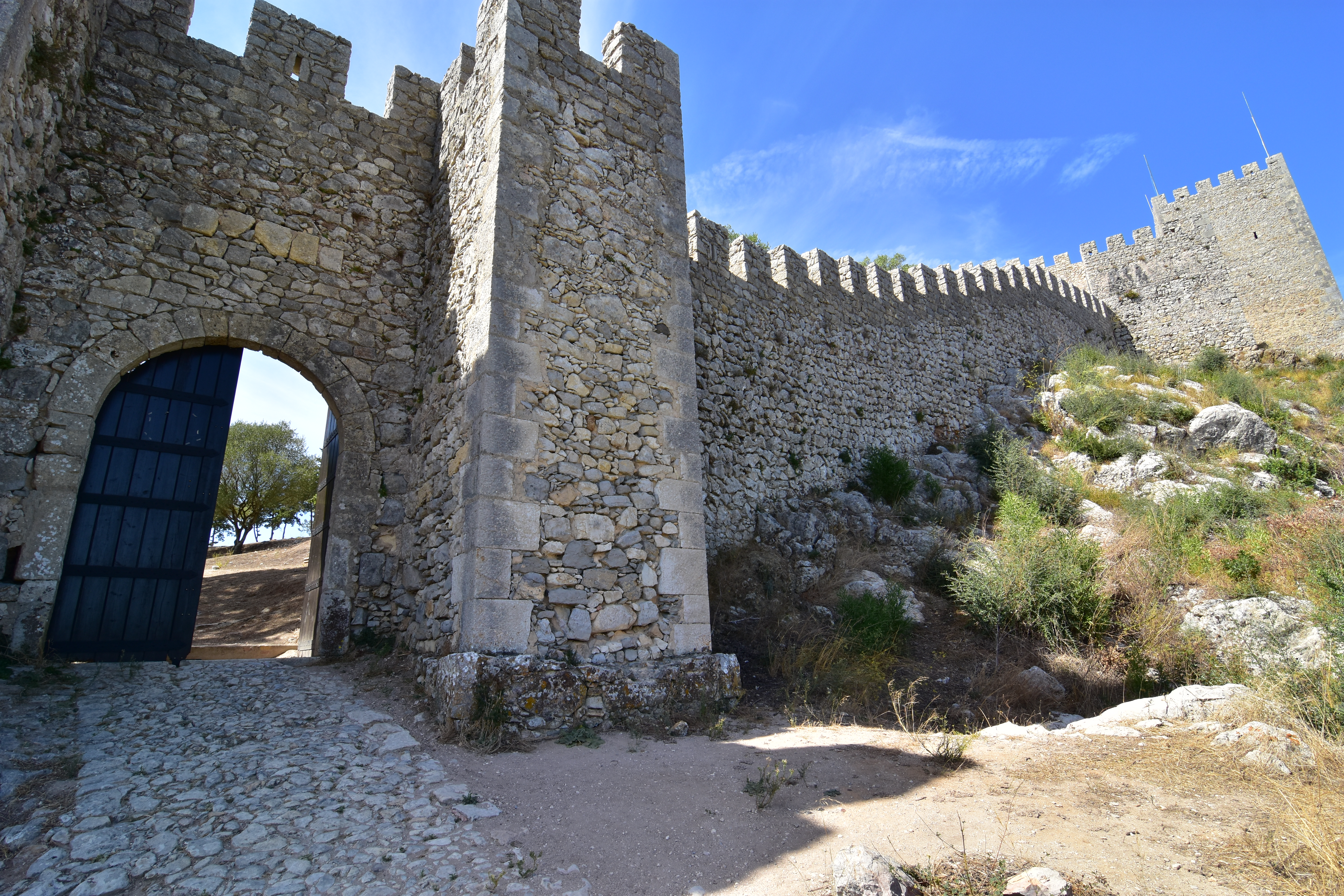
- Main entrance of the Castle

Site information
- Type: Castle
- Owner: Sesimbra Municipality
- Open to the public: Yes (07.00-18.00)
- Condition: Good

Location
- Coordinates: 38°27′10″N 9°06′24″W

Site history
- Fate: Restored

The Castle of Sesimbra, also known as Castle of the Moors, is a castle located in the town of Sesimbra, in the Setúbal District of Portugal. It was classified as a National Monument on 16 June 1910.

== History ==
The medieval castle stands in a dominant position on a cliff, over a cove which constitutes a natural harbour in the Setúbal peninsula between the estuaries of the Tagus river and the Sado river, a few miles from Cape Espichel. It was built on a site occupied in prehistoric times. In the 9th century it was a Muslim settlement during the period of Muslim occupation of Iberia, when it was known as Alcáçova. In 1165 it was conquered by D. Afonso Henriques, the first King of Portugal. In 1191 it was occupied by the Almohads, Moroccan Berbers, who almost entirely destroyed it in the process. The final reconquest took place in 1199, under King Sancho I, with the help of Frankish Crusaders.

Given its strategic importance, numerous enlargements to the castle were carried out immediately after the reconquest and throughout the Middle Ages. In 1323 a second reinforcement of the walls was made and the West Tower was built, this being needed as a lookout to identify Barbary pirates. In 1384 the castle served as a refuge for John of Avis and his troops during the war with Castile (1383–85).

From the fifteenth century, the population gradually began to move down from the hills to settle by the bay and pursue fishing and boatbuilding activities. By 1516 there were already signs of abandonment. The ramparts were reinforced in 1693 and other improvements made and, in 1721, the Church of Santa Maria do Castelo, which was built by Afonso I, was restored. However, the castle was already in a bad condition when it was effectively ruined by the earthquake of 1755. In 1875, part of the grounds was converted into a cemetery.

The advanced state of ruin of the castle was not addressed until between 1933 and 1945, when conservation work was carried out by the Direção-Geral dos Edifícios e Monumentos Nacionais (DGEMN-General Directorate of Buildings and National Monuments). Further restoration was carried out in 1998. The Castle of Sesimbra is now under the management of the Municipality of Sesimbra. The walls can be easily explored on foot and there are also two permanent exhibitions on its history, a shop and a cafeteria.

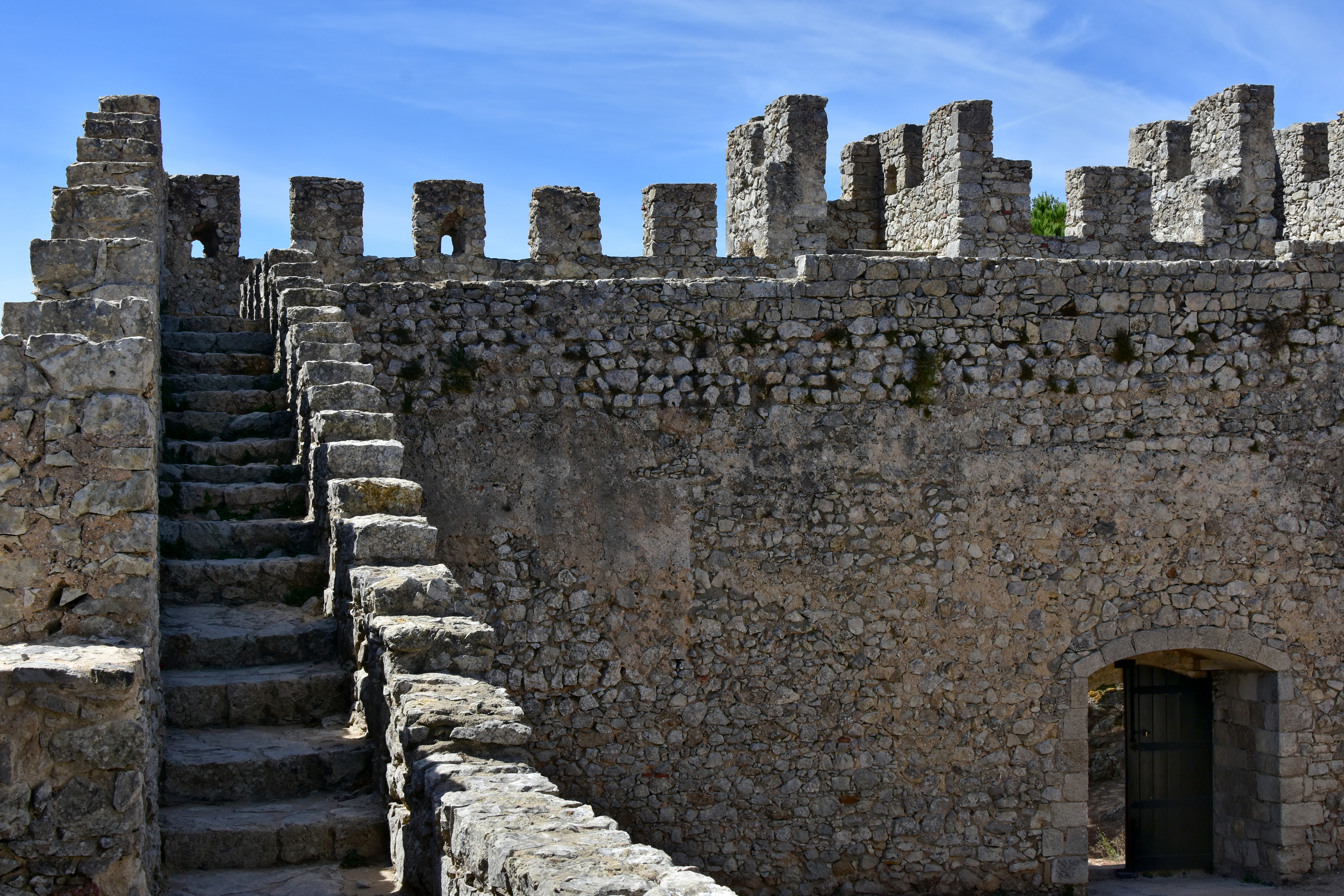

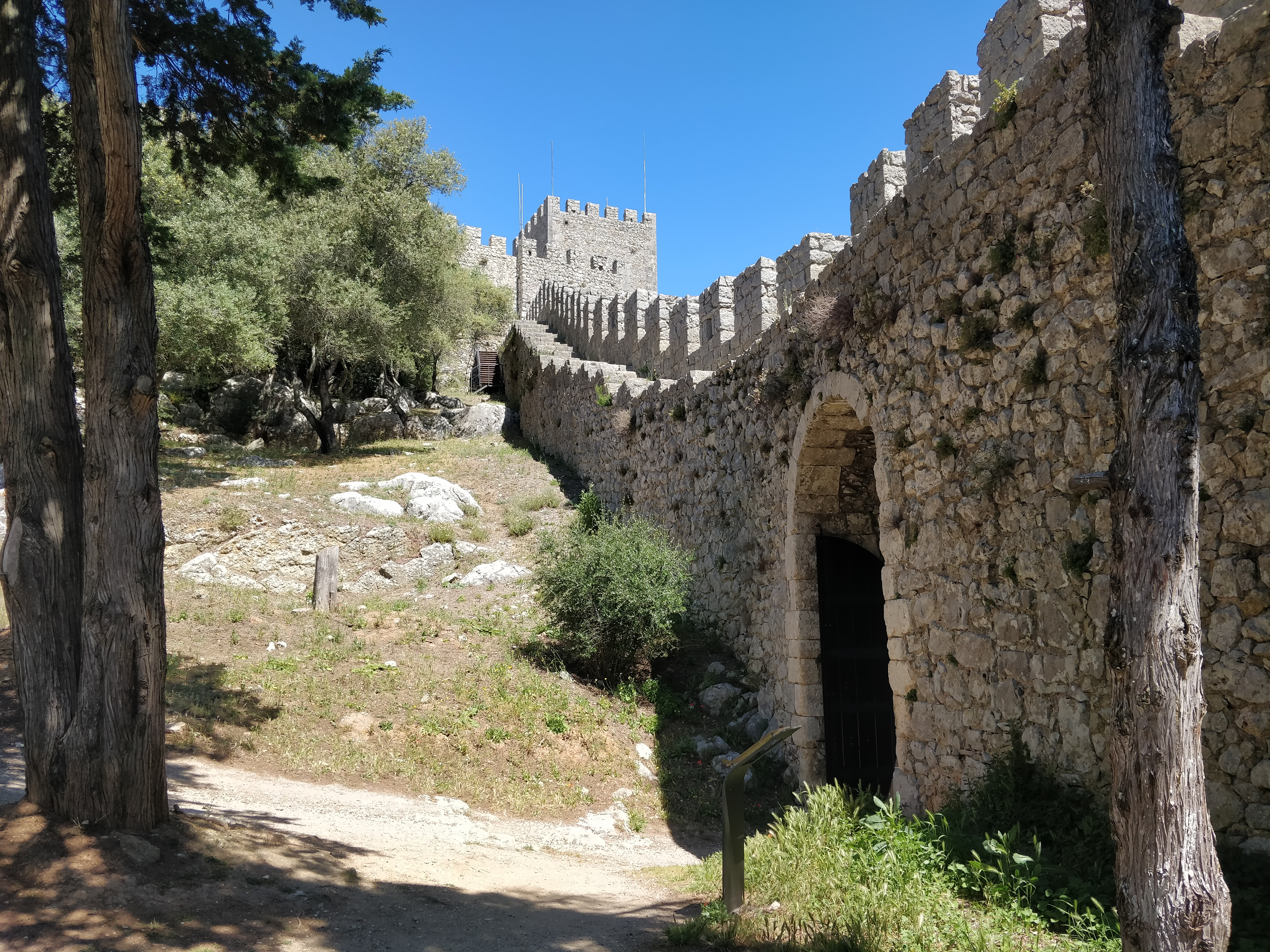

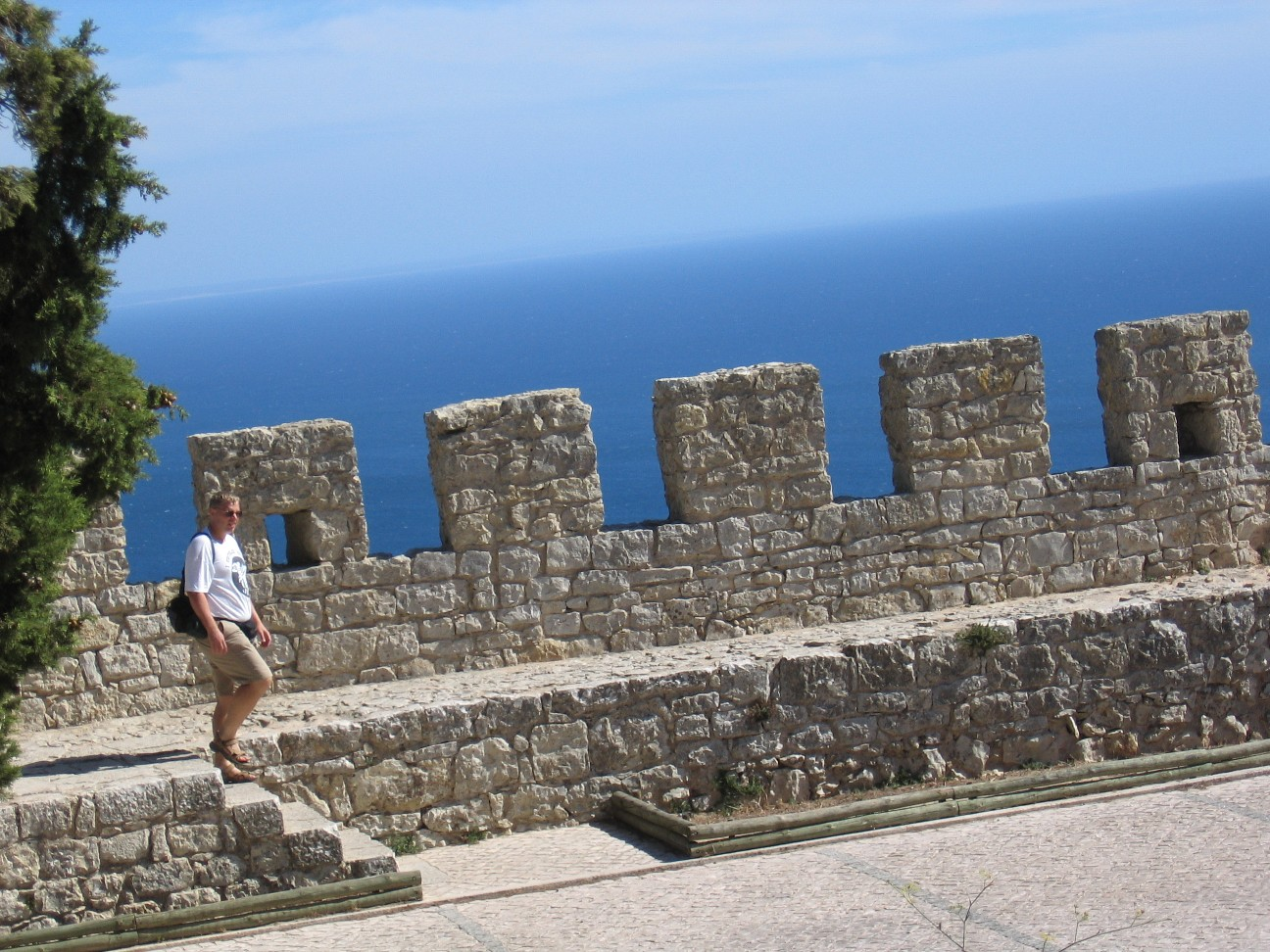
Battlements

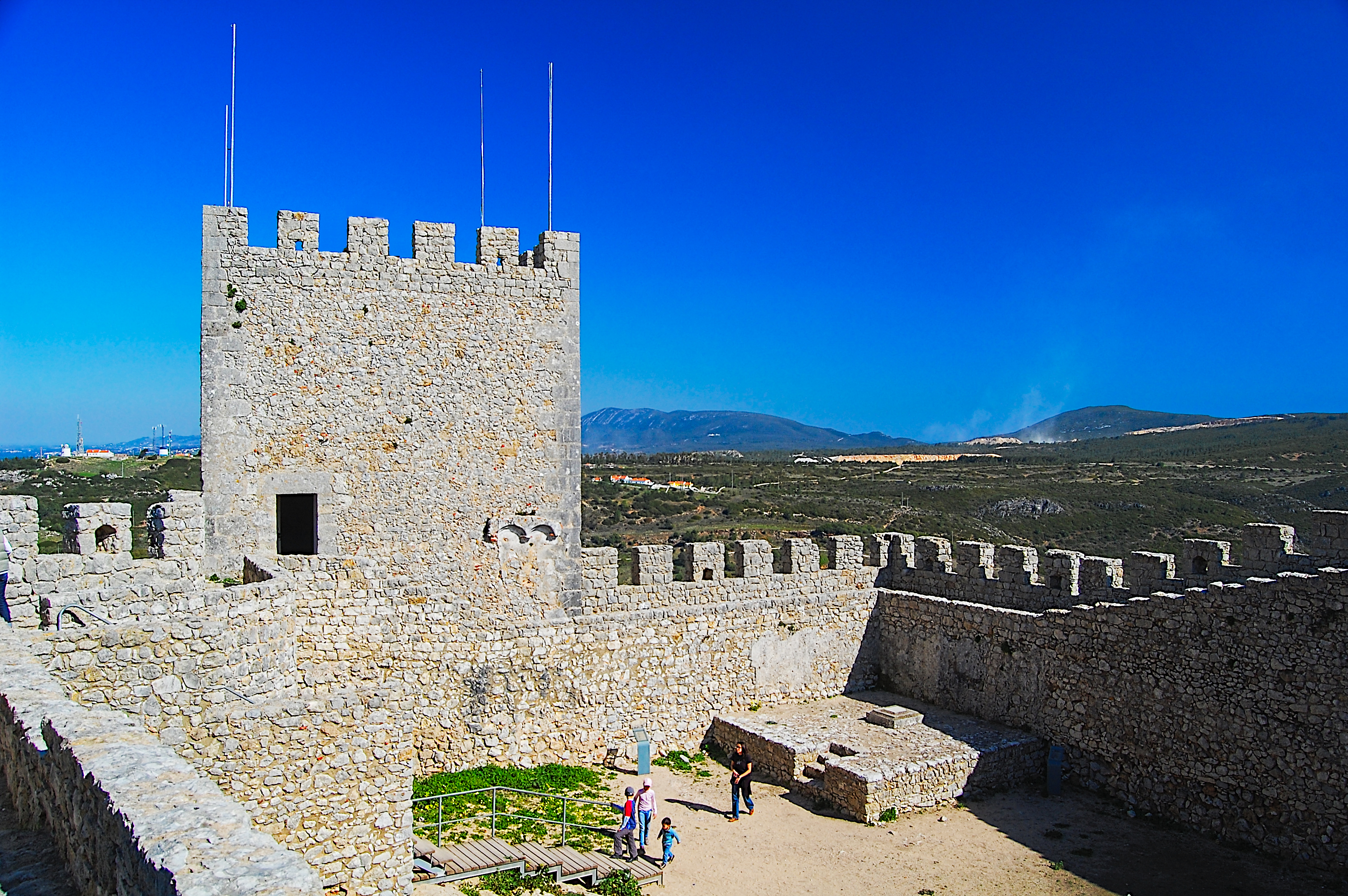

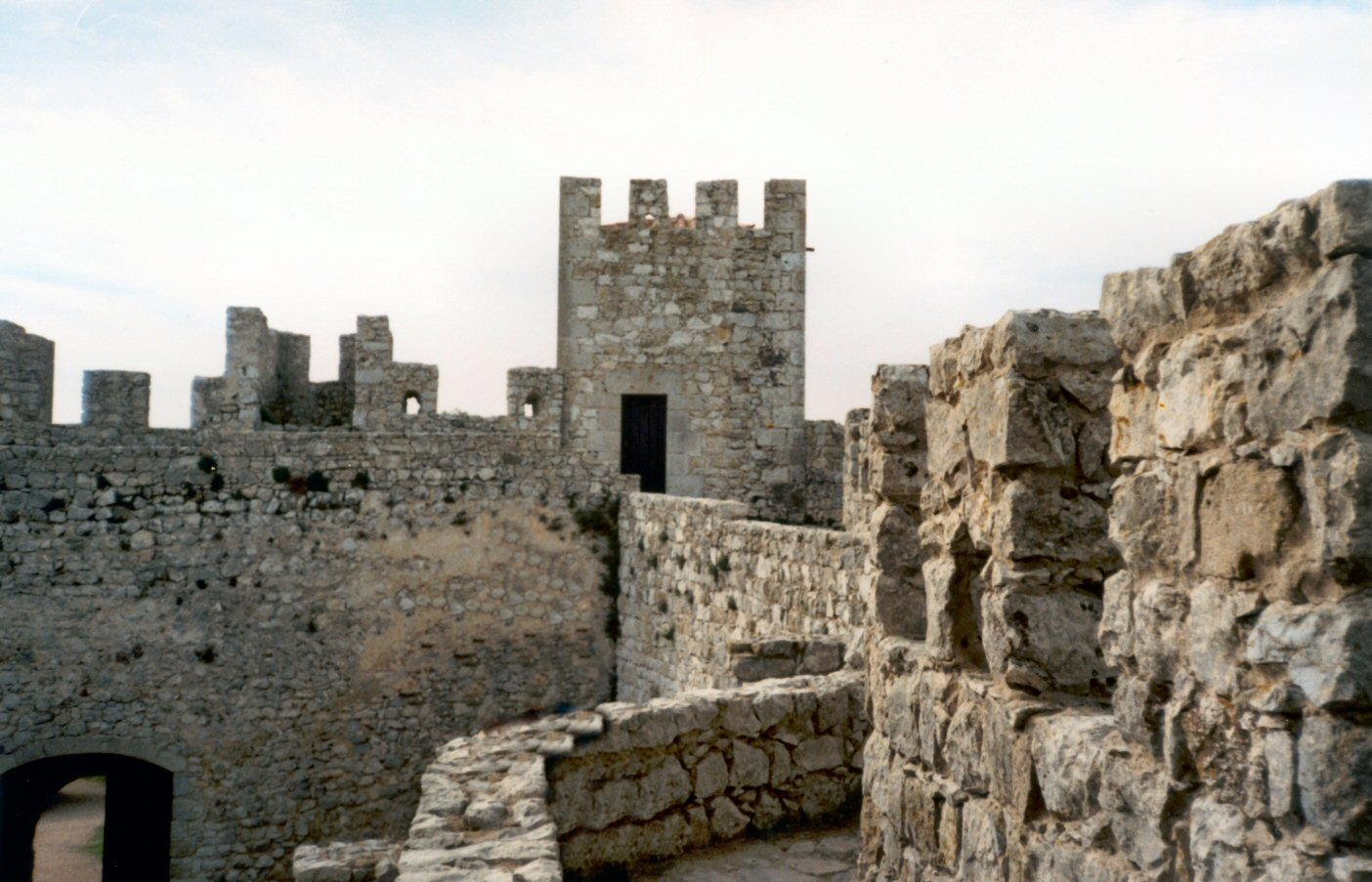
Inside view

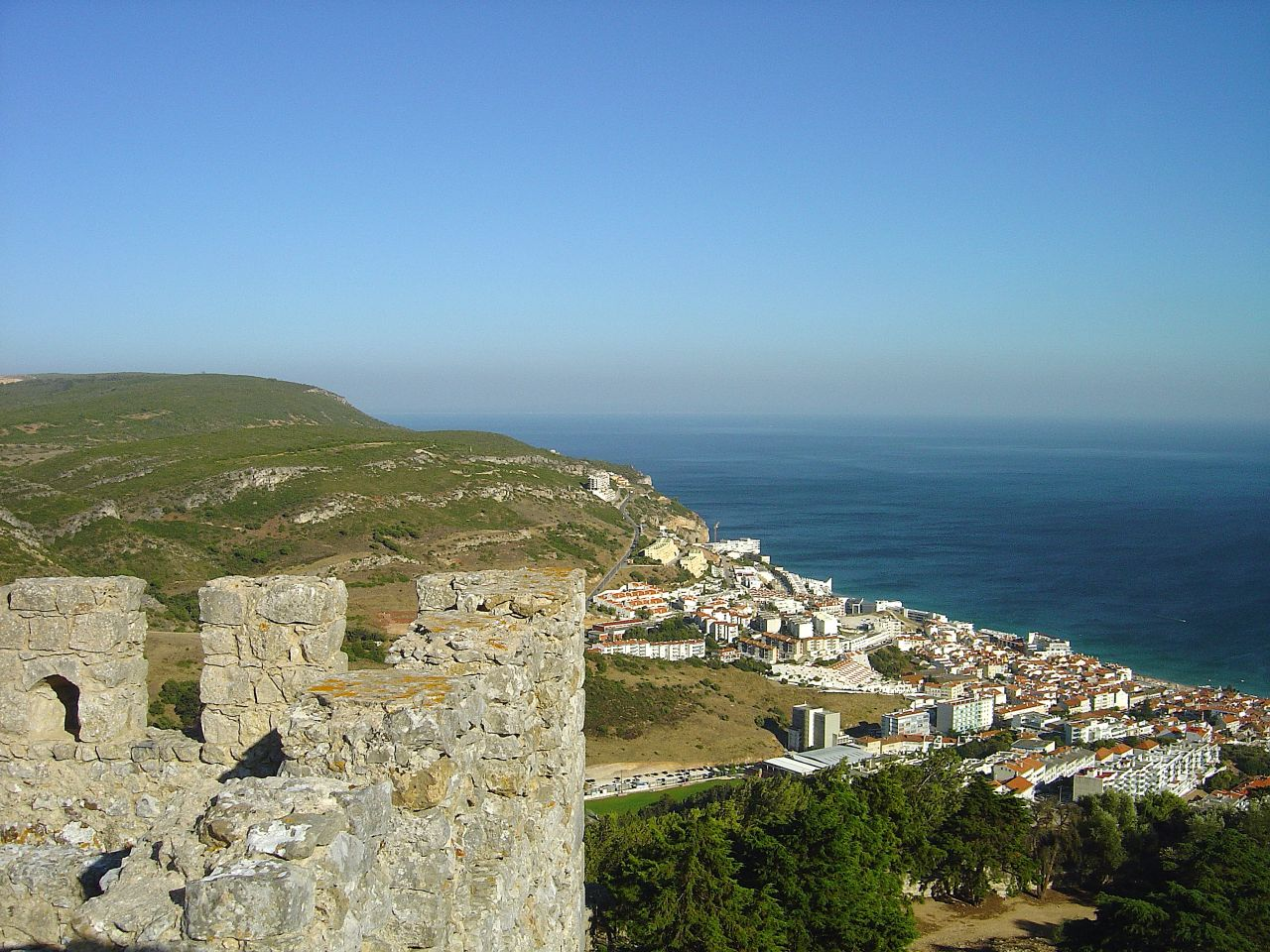

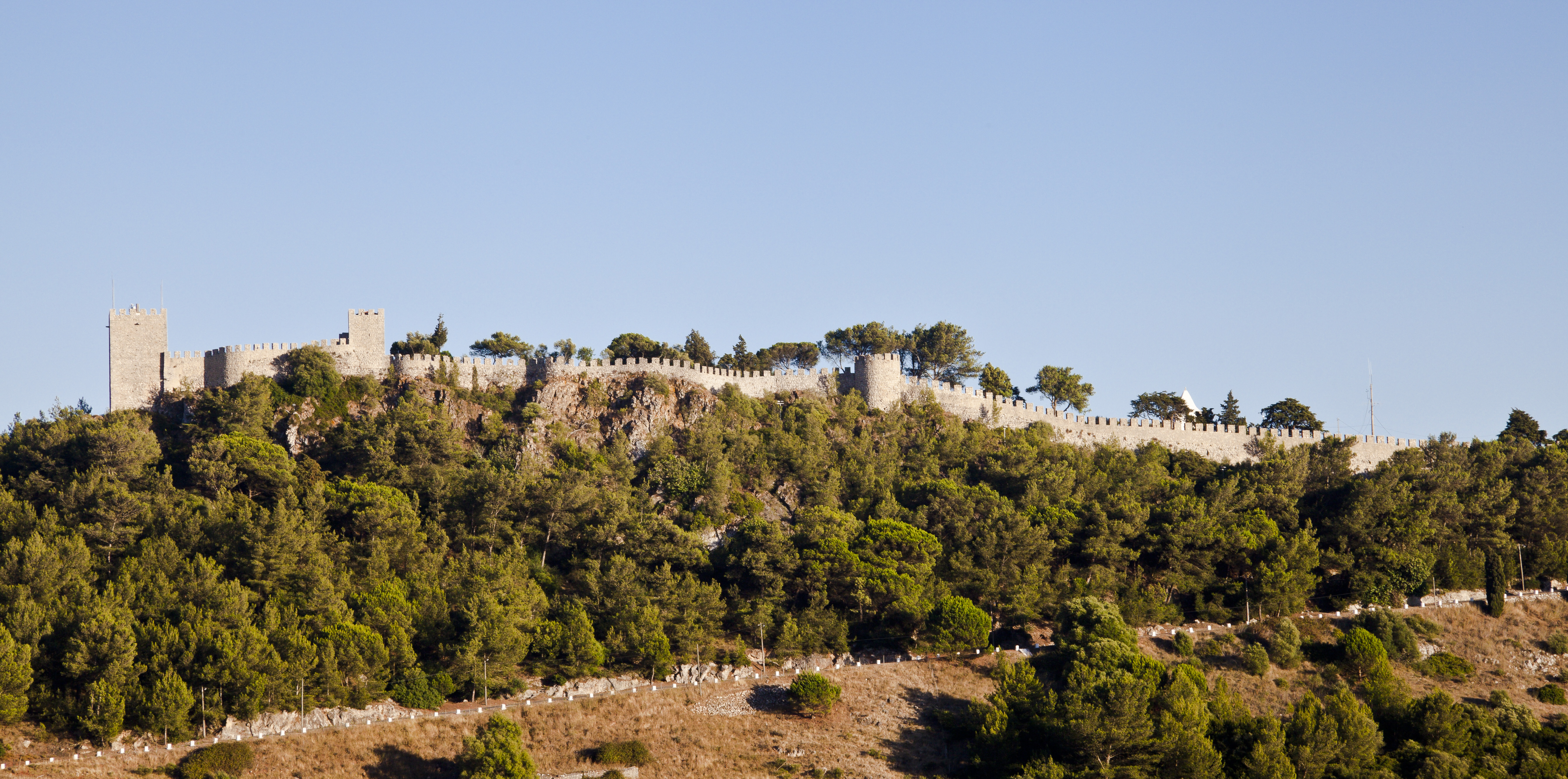
Exterior view from Northwest

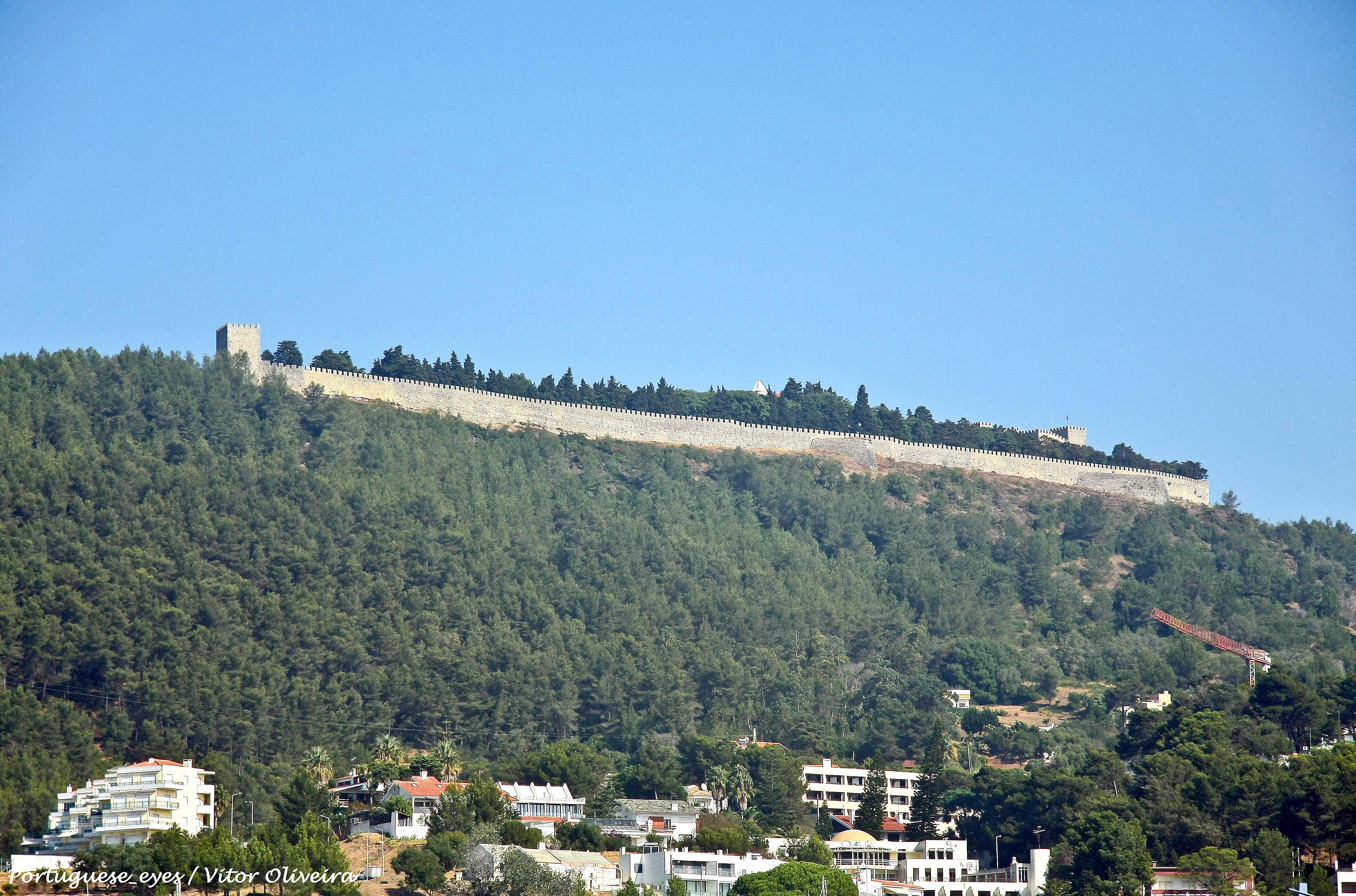
Exterior view from Southeast

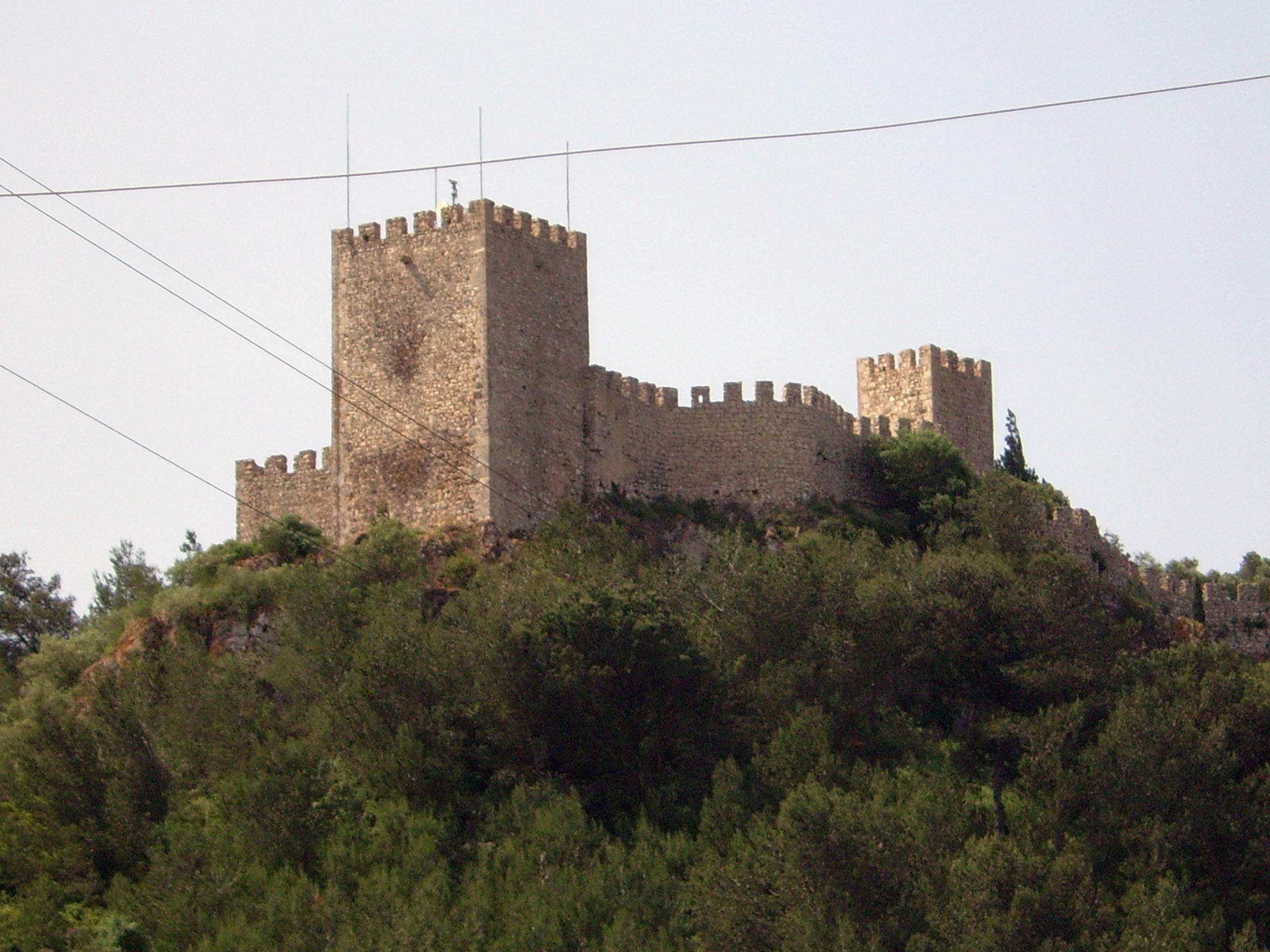
The keep

== See also ==
- Fort of São Teodósio da Ponta do Cavalo
- Fortress of Saint James of Sesimbra

Two coastal forts in Sesimbra.
