= Stéphanie Obertin =

Luxembourgish politician (born 1974)

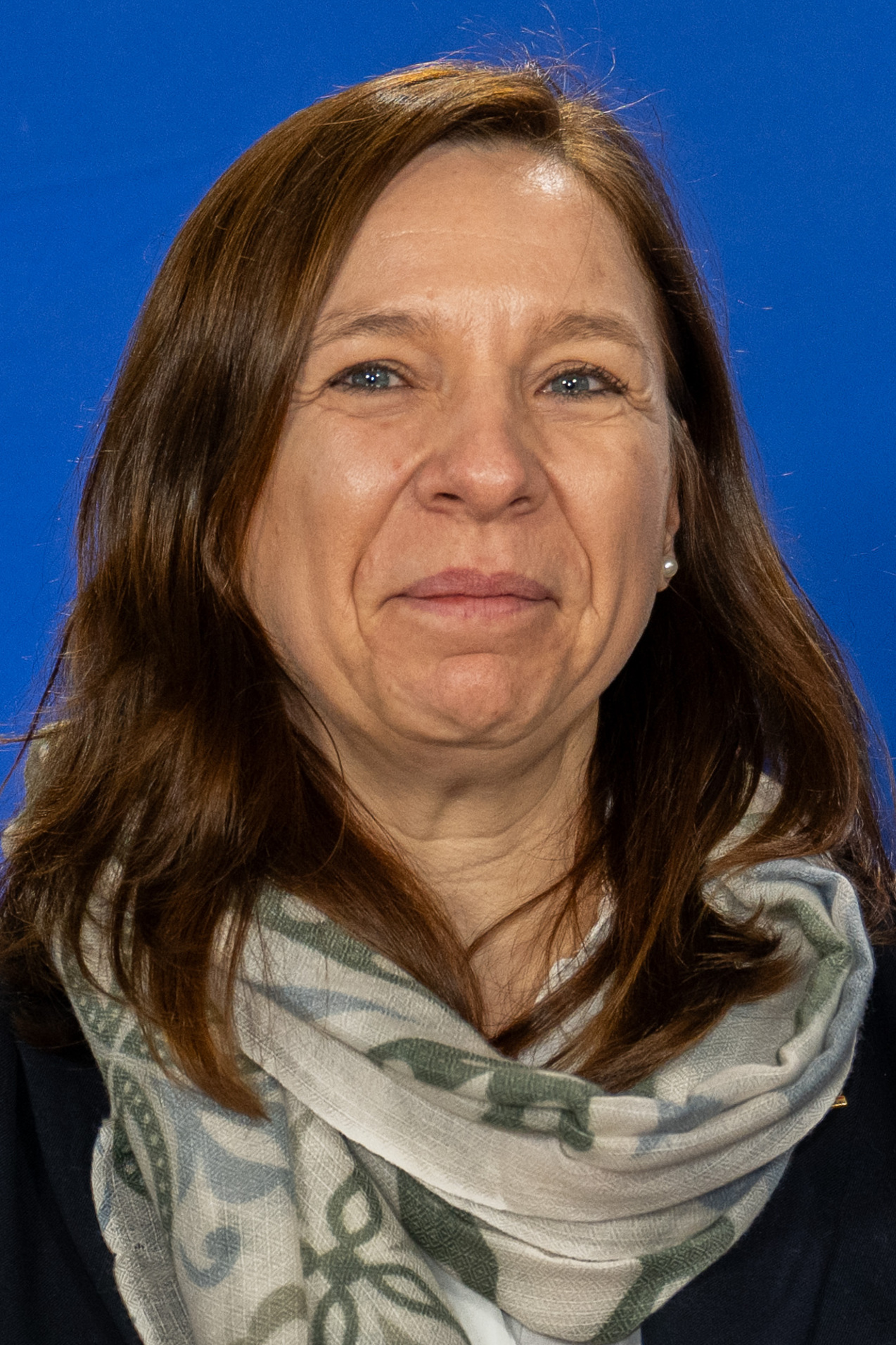
- Obertin in 2024

Minister for Digitalisation Minister for Research and Higher Education
- Incumbent
- Assumed office 17 November 2023
- Prime Minister: Luc Frieden
- Preceded by: Xavier Bettel (Digitalisation); Claude Meisch (Higher Education and Research)

Personal details
- Born: 13 May 1974 (age 51) Luxembourg City, Luxembourg
- Party: Democratic Party

Stéphanie Obertin (born 13 May 1974) is a Luxembourgish politician of the Democratic Party and physician who has been serving as Minister for Digitalisation and Minister for Higher Education and Research since 17 November 2023.

== Life ==
=== General practitioner ===
After finishing her secondary studies at Lycée Michel Rodange with a specialication in mathematics, Obertin studied medicine in Strasbourg and Nancy. She worked as general practitioner in Bonnevoie for 16 years. She also worked as cooperating doctor in the emergency department of CHL. She was president of the General Practitioners of Luxembourg from 2019 to 2022.

=== Politician ===
Obertin first entered politics in 2018, as a DP candidate in that year's general election in the Centre constituency. She received 10,797 votes, placing 17th out of 21 candidates on the DP list and failing to be elected. During the coalition talks for the Bettel II government, she was a member of the negotiation team for the DP, in the working group covering issues of social, family and health politics.

In the 2023 general election, Obertin was one of a number of candidates working in the health sector, underlining a strategy of the four bigger political parties in Luxembourg following the COVID-19 pandemic. Obertin received 13,701 votes, being placed 11th on the Centre list of the DP, once again not being elected to the Chamber. This explains why her nomination as member of the government came as a surprise, even to herself. As five years before, she was member of the working group covering health politics during the coalition talks.

Since 17 November 2023, Obertin is part of the Frieden-Bettel Government, a coalition between the Christian Social People's Party (CSV) and the Democratic Party (DP), serving as Minister for Digitalisation and Minister for Higher Education and Research.

=== Personal life ===
Obertin is single, has two sisters and lives in Rameldange. She plays tennis since her youth and enjoys running and walking in nature.
