= Fort São Domingos da Baralha =

- Forte de São Domingos da Baralha
- Sesimbra, Portugal
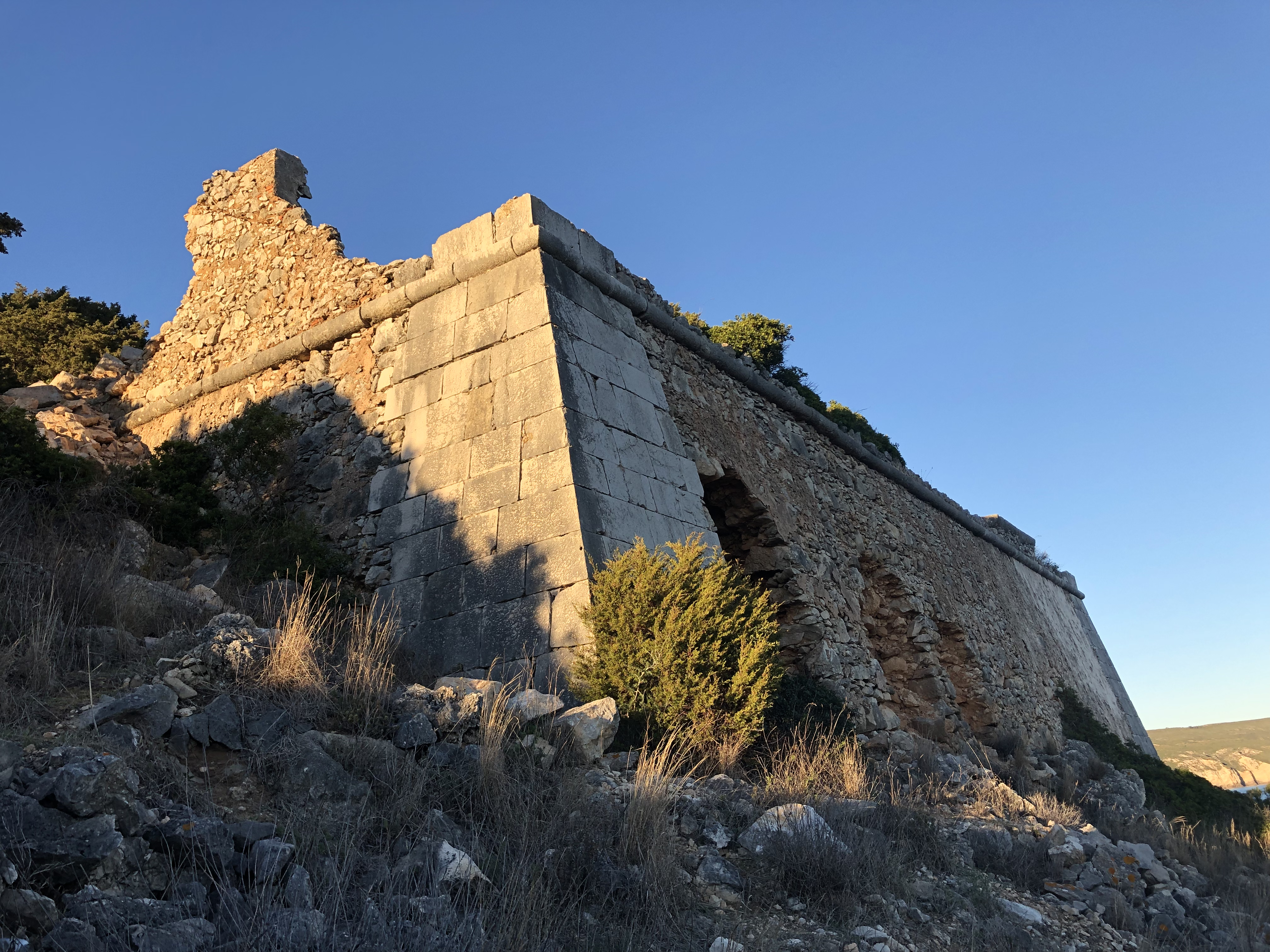

Site information
- Type: Bastion fort
- Open to the public: Yes
- Condition: Ruined

Location
- Coordinates: 38°24′48″N 9°11′25″W

Site history
- Built: 1655
- Events: Peninsular War

The Fort São Domingos da Baralha (Forte de São Domingos da Baralha in Portuguese) or Baralha Fort (Forte da Baralha in Portuguese) is located next to Baleeira beach, between Cape Espichel and Sesimbra, in the District of Setúbal, in Portugal. It was built in 1665 as part of Portugal's defensive strategy implemented by John IV, construction having begun in the reign of Afonso VI, thus contributing to the protection and surveillance of the coast.

Considered at the time part of the first line of defense of the Arrábida coast, this fort is currently abandoned and in ruins.

== History ==
As part of the reformulation of the kingdom's defensive strategy implemented by King John IV, it was ordered to be built in the 17th century, and its construction began in the reign of D. Afonso VI, being concluded under the reign of Peter II. Its purpose was not only to protect this part of the Arrábida coastline, but also to control and monitor populations, contributing to the presence of the Crown in this location.

It was built in an isolated rural area, 27 meters above sea level, with a rectangular plan, with service buildings and a cistern integrated into the building's platform. Its built surface corresponded to 408 m^{2} with an adjacent land of 10,392 m^{2}, making a total of 10,800 m^{2}.

It was under the jurisdiction of the command at the fortress of Sesimbra, along with the forts Santiago, São Teodósio, Nossa Senhora do Cabo and the São Pedro das Areias Brancas (or da Foz).

On June 21, 1808, during the Peninsular War, it was attacked by the United Kingdom, Portugal's allies against the French invaders. This attack aimed to block any impetus from the French navy, seeking to disable this fortified point on the Portuguese coast that could eventually serve the French. After the attack on the fort, the 8 artillery pieces it was equipped with were thrown into the sea. Regarding the soldiers of this fortification, there are reports that they did not make any attempt to defend the fort, since they knew that the English were allies of Portugal.

The fort contains the ruins of the chapel Senhor Jesus dos Navegantes.

After the Portuguese Civil War, the fort was abandoned. Maintaining it was not considered reasonable, thus, with the passing of time, the fort decayed, exposed to the weather.

In the 1980s, the possibility of assigning this property to the Sesimbra city hall was proposed, however, this did not happen. Therefore, in an effort to preserve the history of this fort, the coat of arms that surmounted the entrance portal was removed by the city services, becoming part of the reserves of the City Museum of Sesimbra.

It is currently used as a stopping point on the Chã dos Navegantes pedestrian route (PR1-SSB), along with the ruins of the Senhor Jesus dos Navegantes chapel, which is located about 400 meters from the Fort. On this route, it is thus possible to appreciate the magnificence presented by the curtain wall and the cistern integrated into the platform of the Fort.

== Gallery ==
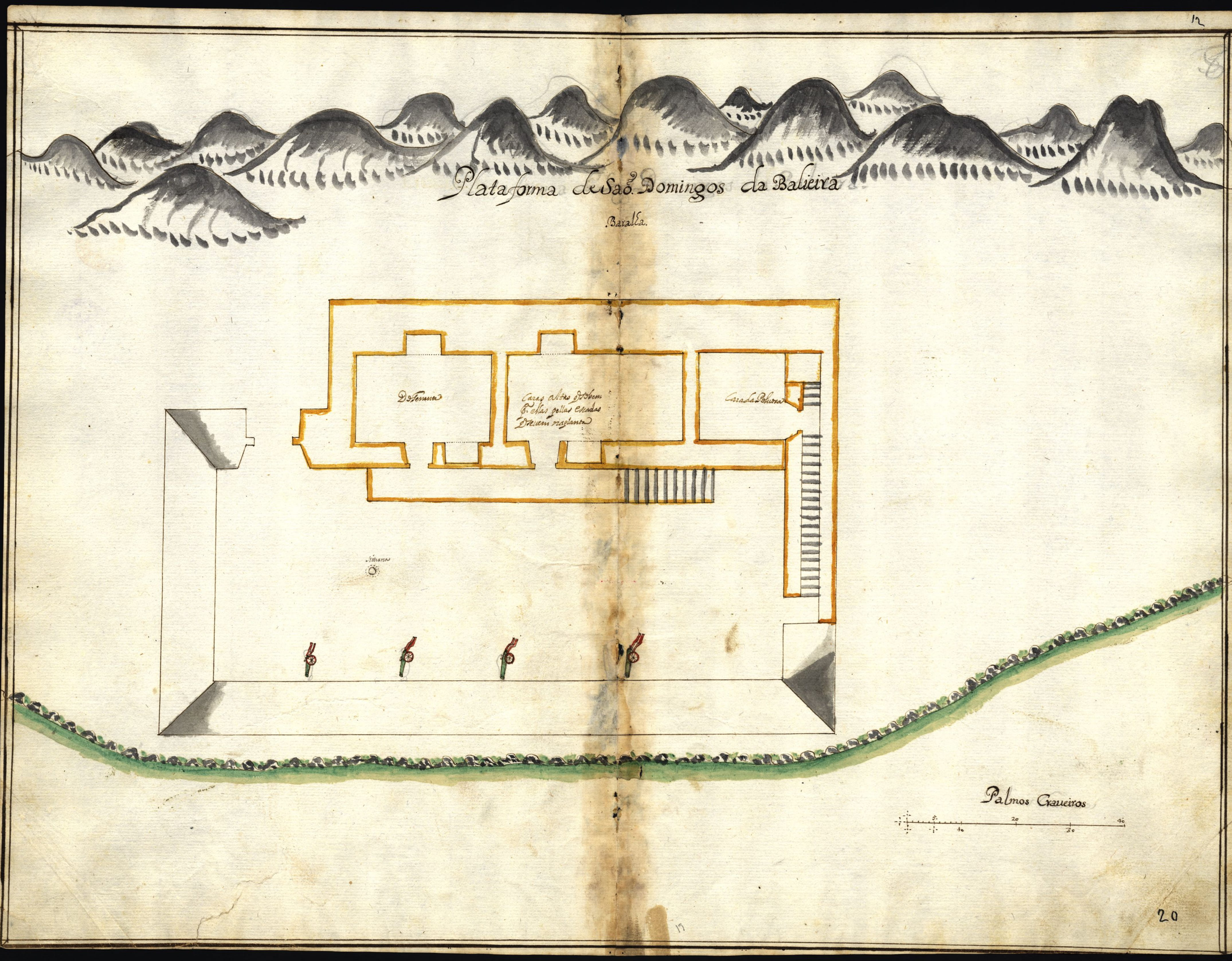
18th century plan of the fort.

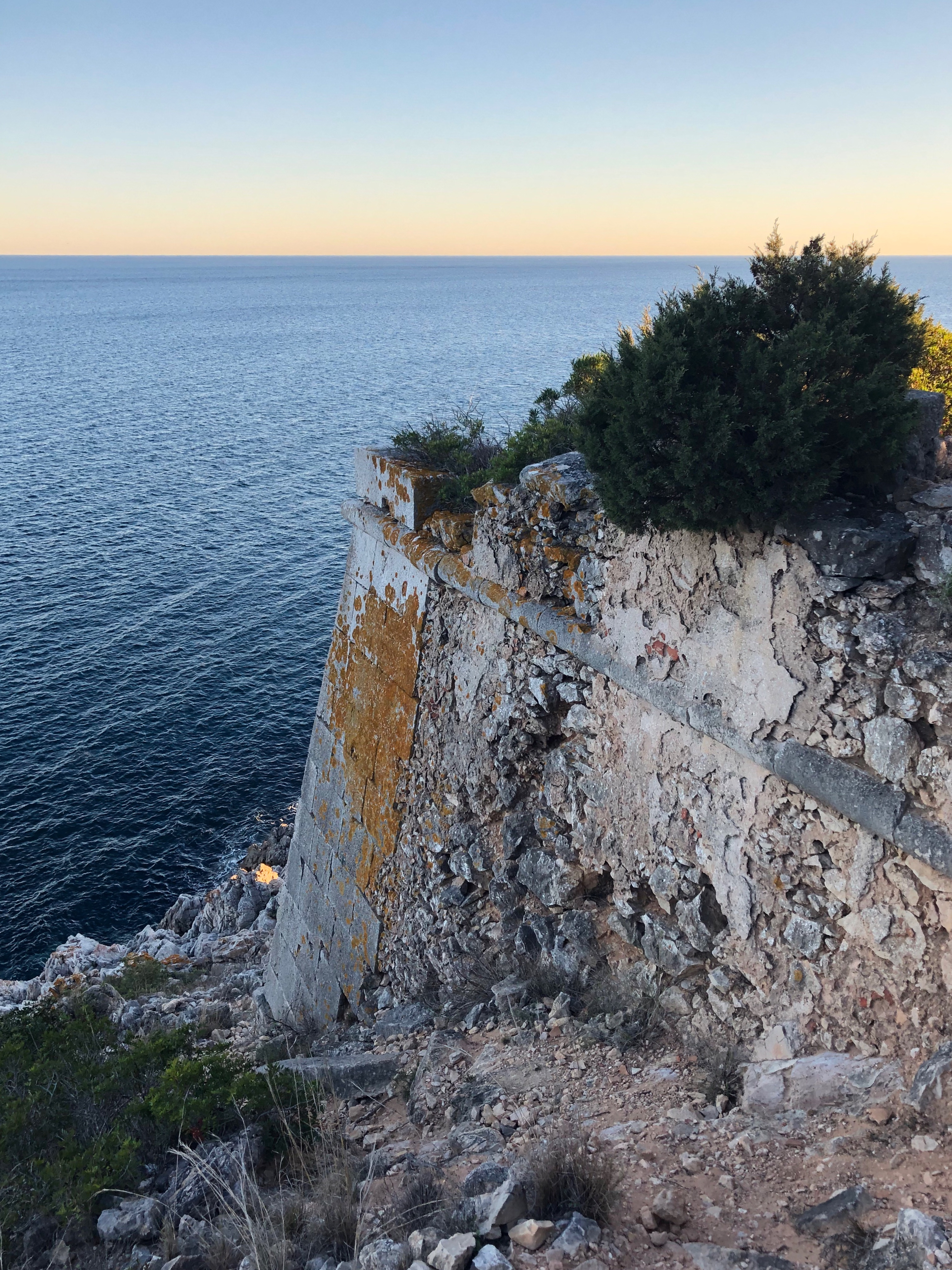
Remains of the eastern wall section.

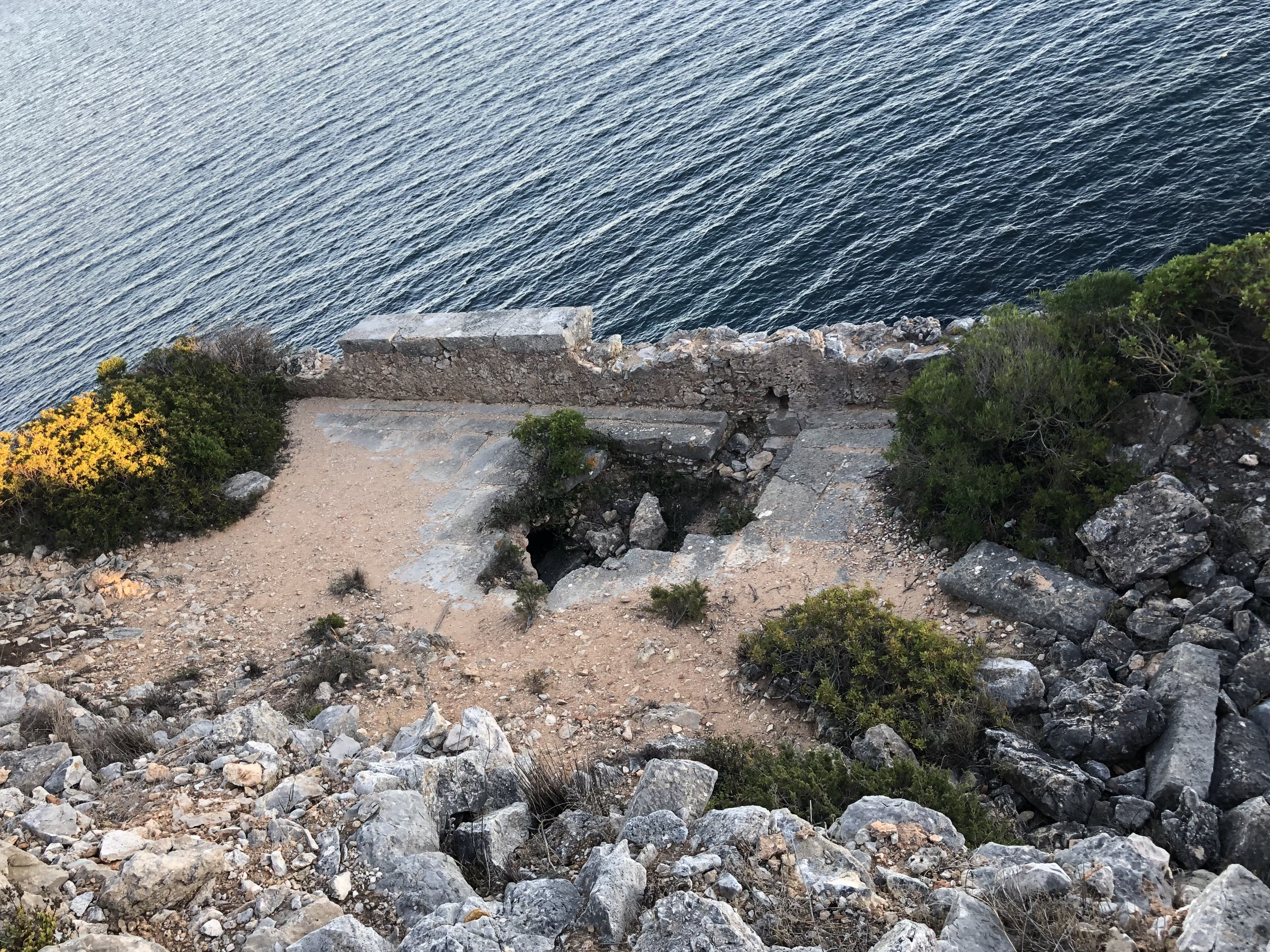
Platform.

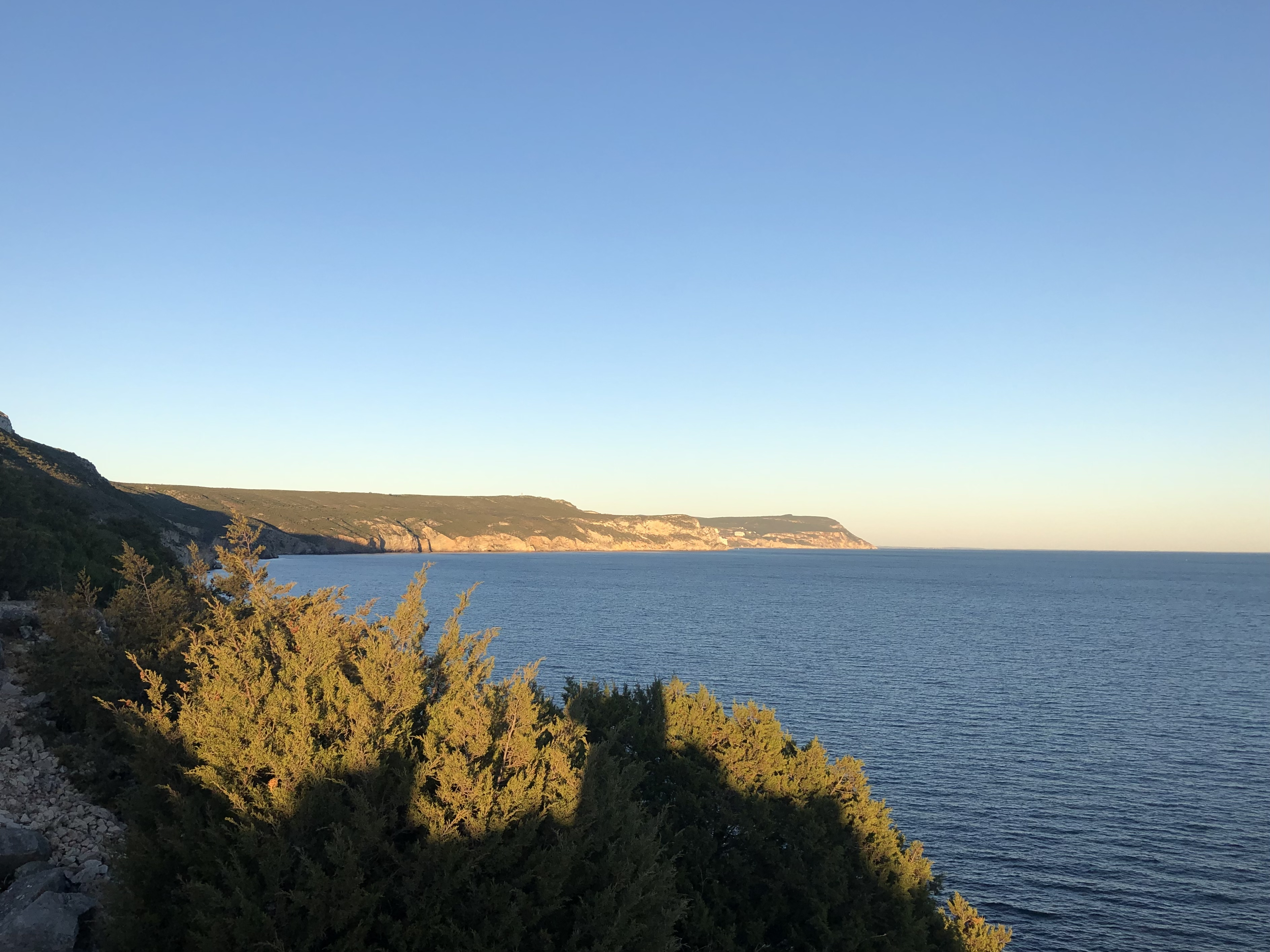
View from the fort.
