= Senningen =

Sennengen Luxembourgish: Senneng
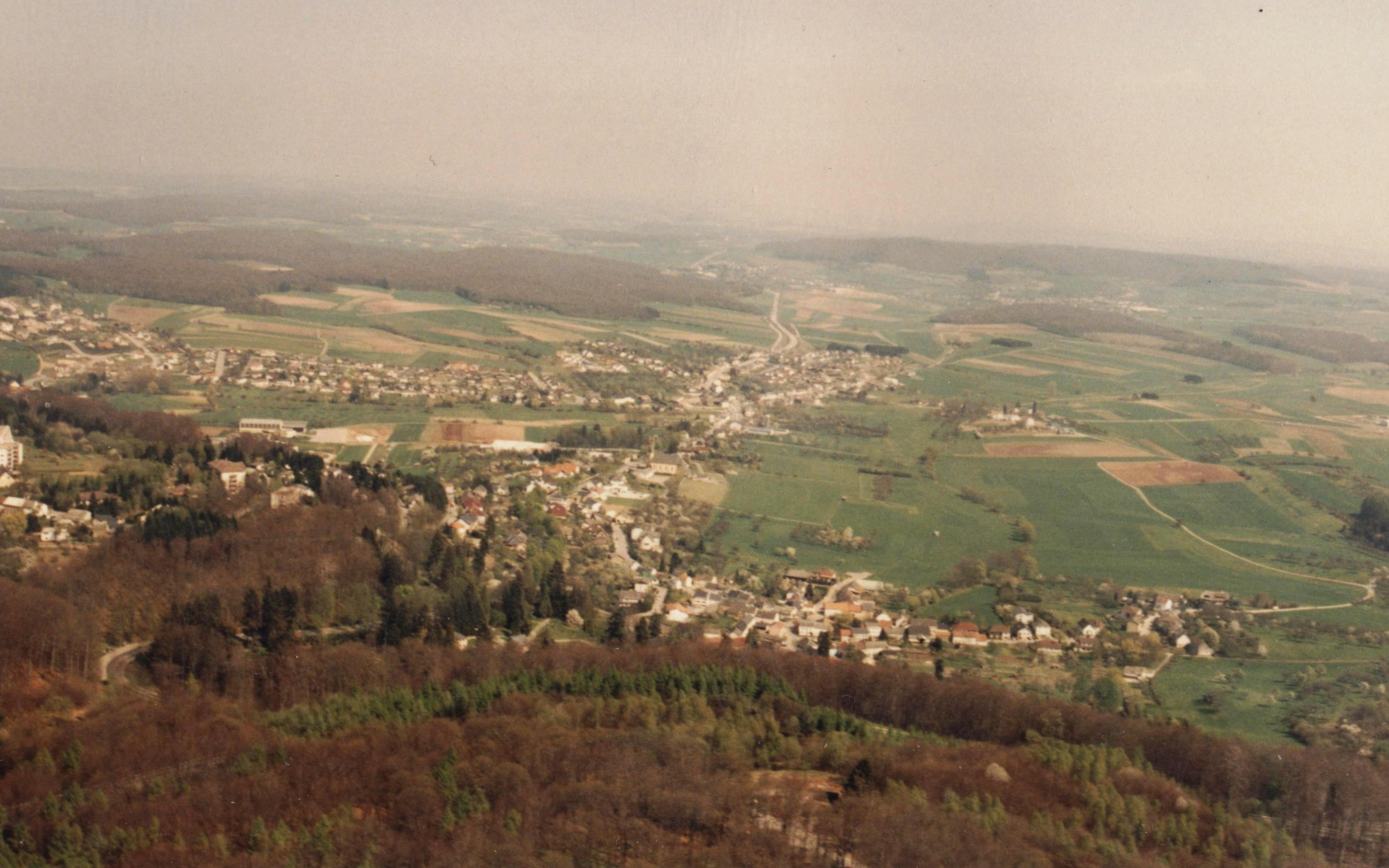
- Sennengen Town

- Location in Luxembourg
- Country: Luxembourg
- Commune: Niederanven

Population (2023)
  - Total: 727
- Time zone: UTC+1 (GMT+1)
- Postcode: L 6961

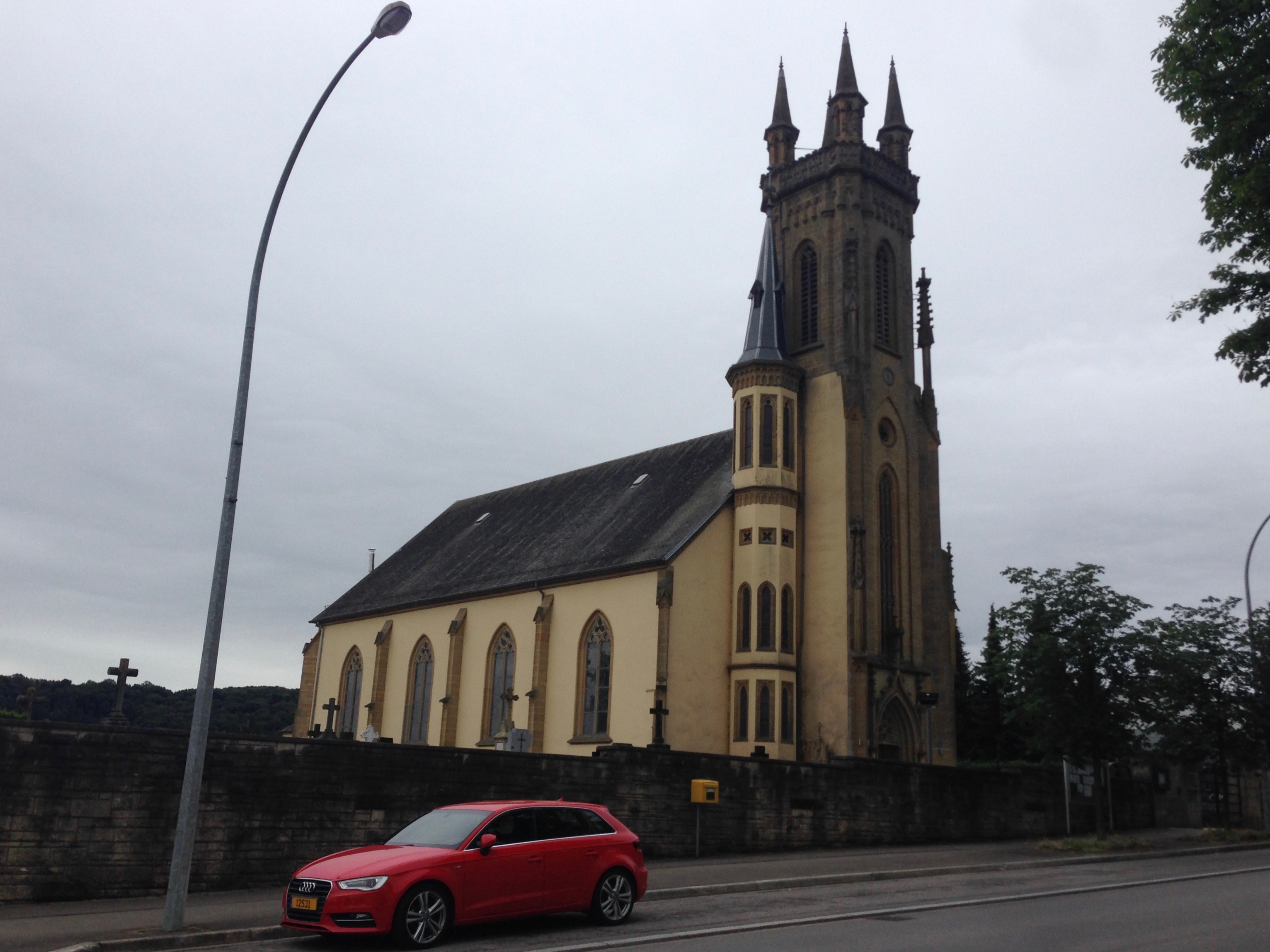
The Church of the Assumption of the Virgin Mary, Niederanven between Niederanven and Senningen

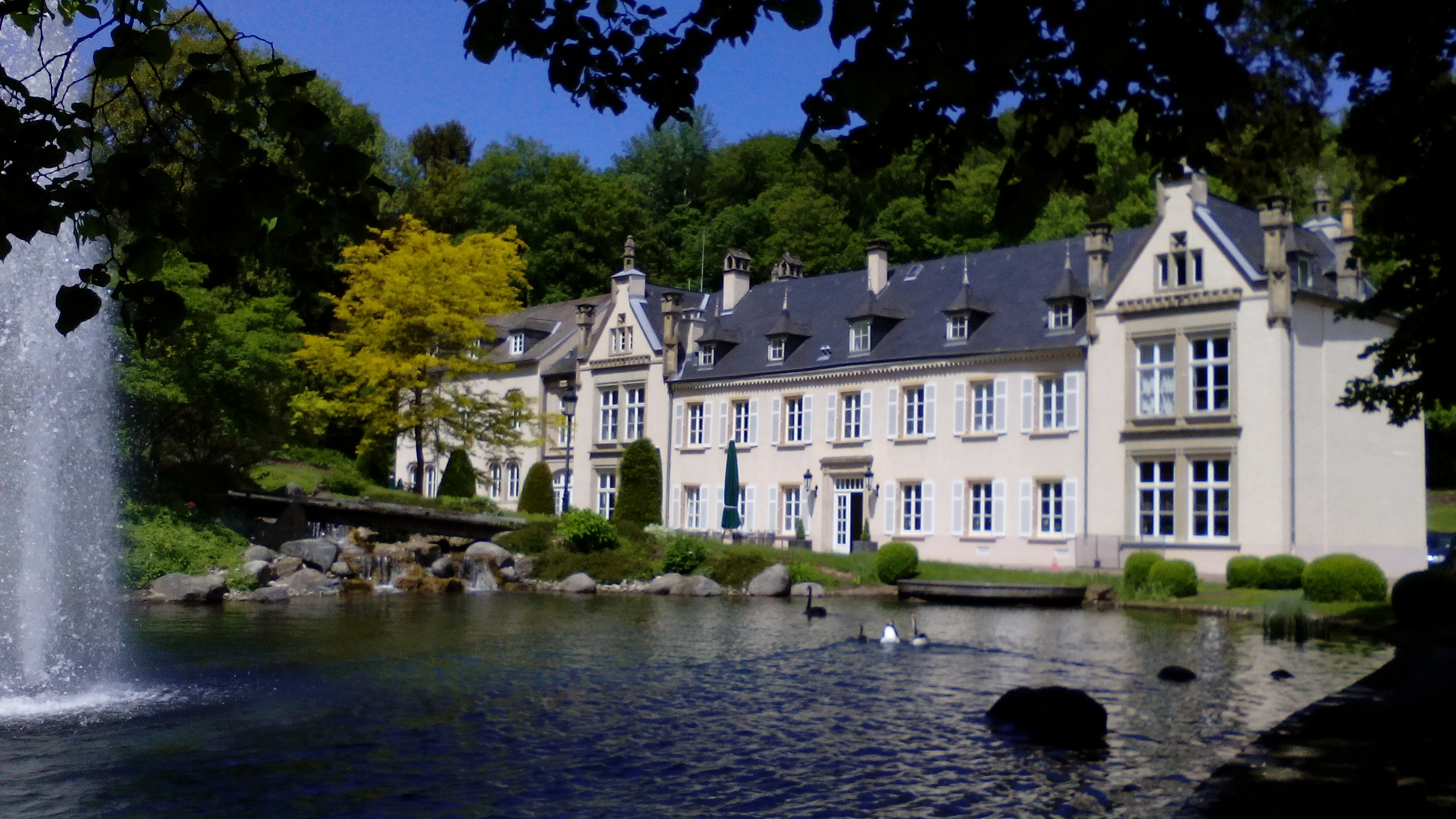
Senningen castle (2018).

Senningen (German pronunciation: [ˈzɛnɪŋən]; Luxembourgish: Senneng), is a small town in the commune of Niederanven, in central Luxembourg. As of September 2026, the town has a population of 758.

== History ==
The town developed following the late-17th-century establishment by monks of a paper mill within the town powered by the fast flowing Senninger Brook. Following a fire in 1750, Pierre Bourgeois, a French immigrant, ordered the facilities of the mill enlarged and the residential property on the site rebuilt in the classical style. Output was under the ownership of Jacques Lamort throughout the early 1800s, with mechanisation improvements to the mill and the canalisation of the Senninger Brook. However, as a result of economic problems, the mill was finally closed in 1882. The same year, the site was bought by Ernest Derveaux who demolished the mill and transformed the owner's residence into a revival-style castle, Senningen Castle, (French: Le château de Senningen), which included neo-Gothic wings, and a landscaped surrounding park with ornamental plants and trees and lake with a fountain.

From 1940 to 1944, the Nazis used the castle as a convalescent home for artists during the occupation of Luxembourg. In 1952, the Luxembourg army used it for one of its battalions until 1968. Since then, the site has acted as the seat of Luxembourg's National Communications centre, as well as a conference centre for use during State visits, with a press room and cabins for interpreters. Additional renovation work was completed in 2004. The Luxembourg government used the site for European Council summits during its 1991 and 1997 presidencies of the Council of Ministers.

On 24 May 2007, Senningen Castle hosted Russian President Vladimir Putin and Luxembourg Prime Minister Jean-Claude Juncker for an official visit.

The Centre National de Crise (CNC) national crisis centre next to the castle complex was inaugurated in 2021.
