= Ernster =

Village in Luxemburg

Coordinates: 49°41′N 6°15′E

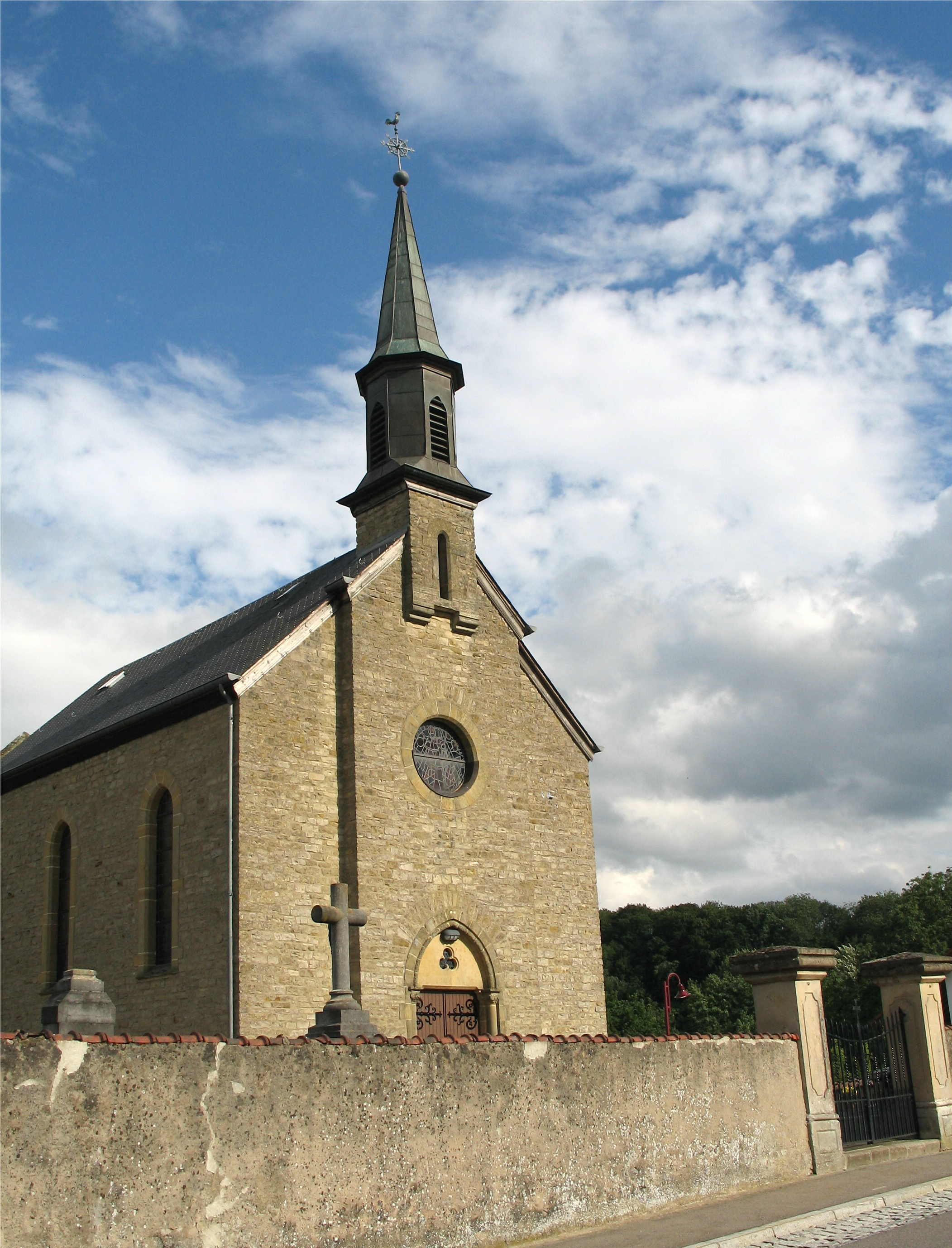
KieIer

Ernster (German pronunciation: [ˈɛʁnstɐ]; Luxembourgish: Iernster) is a small town in the commune of Niederanven, in central Luxembourg. As of September 2026, the town has a population of 464.
