= Fort of São Teodósio da Ponta do Cavalo =

17th Century fort in Portugal

- Forte de São Teodósio da Ponta do Cavalo
- Sesimbra in Portugal
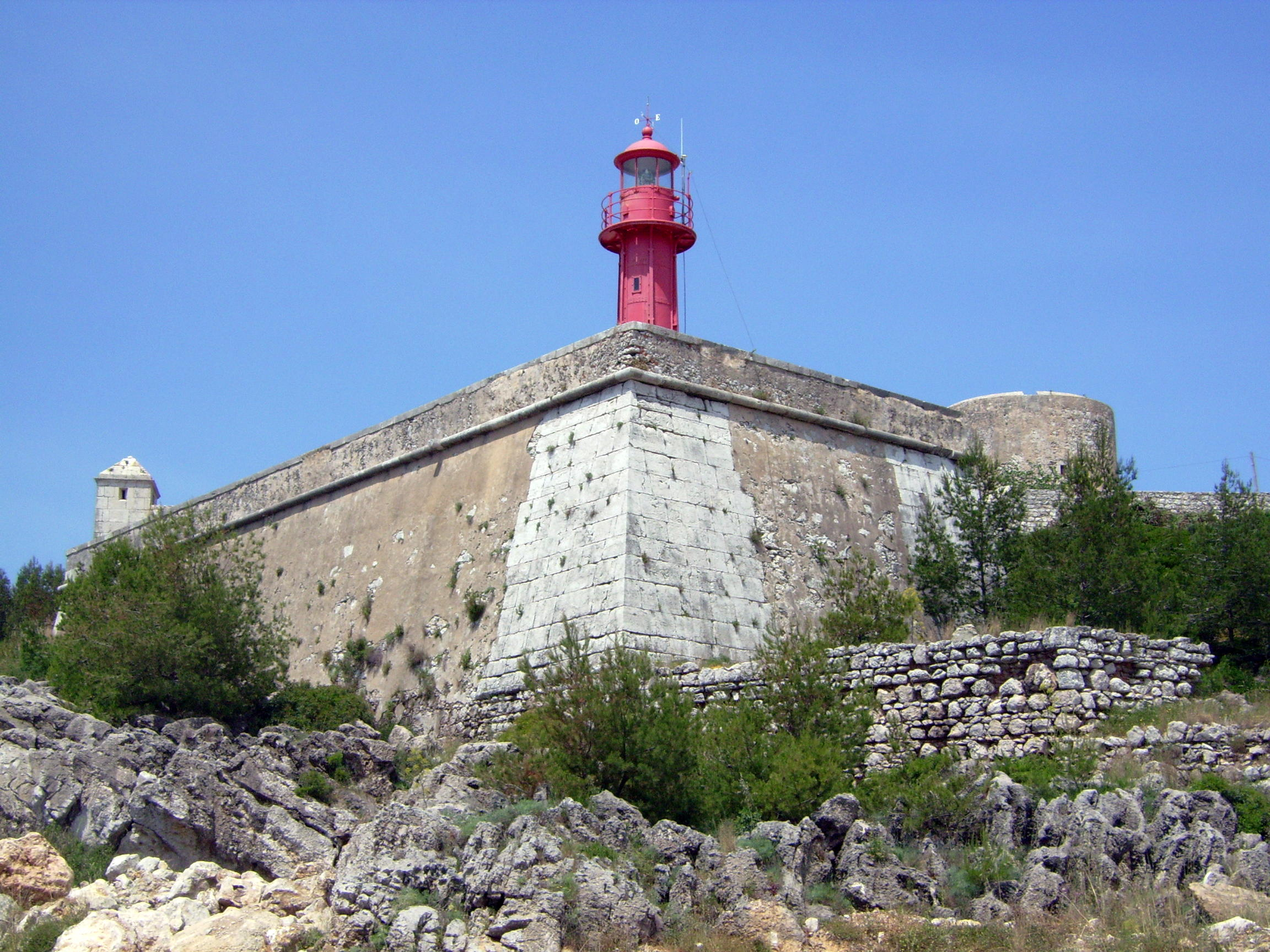
- View of the fort and the Fort of Cavalo Lighthouse

Site information
- Type: Bastion fort
- Operator: Portuguese Navy
- Open to the public: no
- Condition: Well maintained

Location
- Coordinates: 38°26′06″N 9°07′00″W

Site history
- Built: 1652
- Built by: Sebastião Pereira de Frias
- In use: until 1834
- Materials: Brick and stone masonry

The Fort of São Teodósio da Ponta do Cavalo is a coastal fort located in a dominant position at the extreme west of the Bay of Sesimbra in the Setúbal District of Portugal. It was built between 1648 and 1652.

== History ==
During the period of the Portuguese Restoration War (1640-68), King John IV undertook a project to modernize the coastal defences of the country. This included the remodelling of existing fortresses and reinforcing their firepower, together with the construction of new fortresses located in strategic positions. The Fort of São Teodósio was part of the defensive line of the stretch of coast, known today as the Costa Azul (Blue Coast), stretching from Albarquel to Sesimbra, which was designed to assist with the defence of the important maritime settlement of Setúbal.

The fort was named in honour of the Crown Prince, Dom Teodósio, Prince of Brazil. It was executed by the military engineer Sebastião Pereira de Frias. Built in the Mannerist style from stone and brick, it has an irregular polygonal plan, with two square bastions and a circular tower in the centre.

The fortification was badly damaged by the earthquake in 1755 but never lost its strategic importance. In the 19th century it was garrisoned at the time of the Peninsular War, during the first French invasion led by General Junot (1807-08). Abandoned by troops in 1822, it was again used during the Liberal Wars (1828-34), but fell into disrepair thereafter. In 1895 a lighthouse was installed inside the fort.

In the twentieth century, the original layout of the fort was altered to accommodate construction of a harbour and its access road. It is now occupied by the Portuguese Navy, which is also responsible for managing the lighthouse. Visits are not possible.
