= Fort of Cavalo Lighthouse =

Lighthouse in Portugal

Fort of Cavalo Lighthouse Farol do Forte do Cavalo
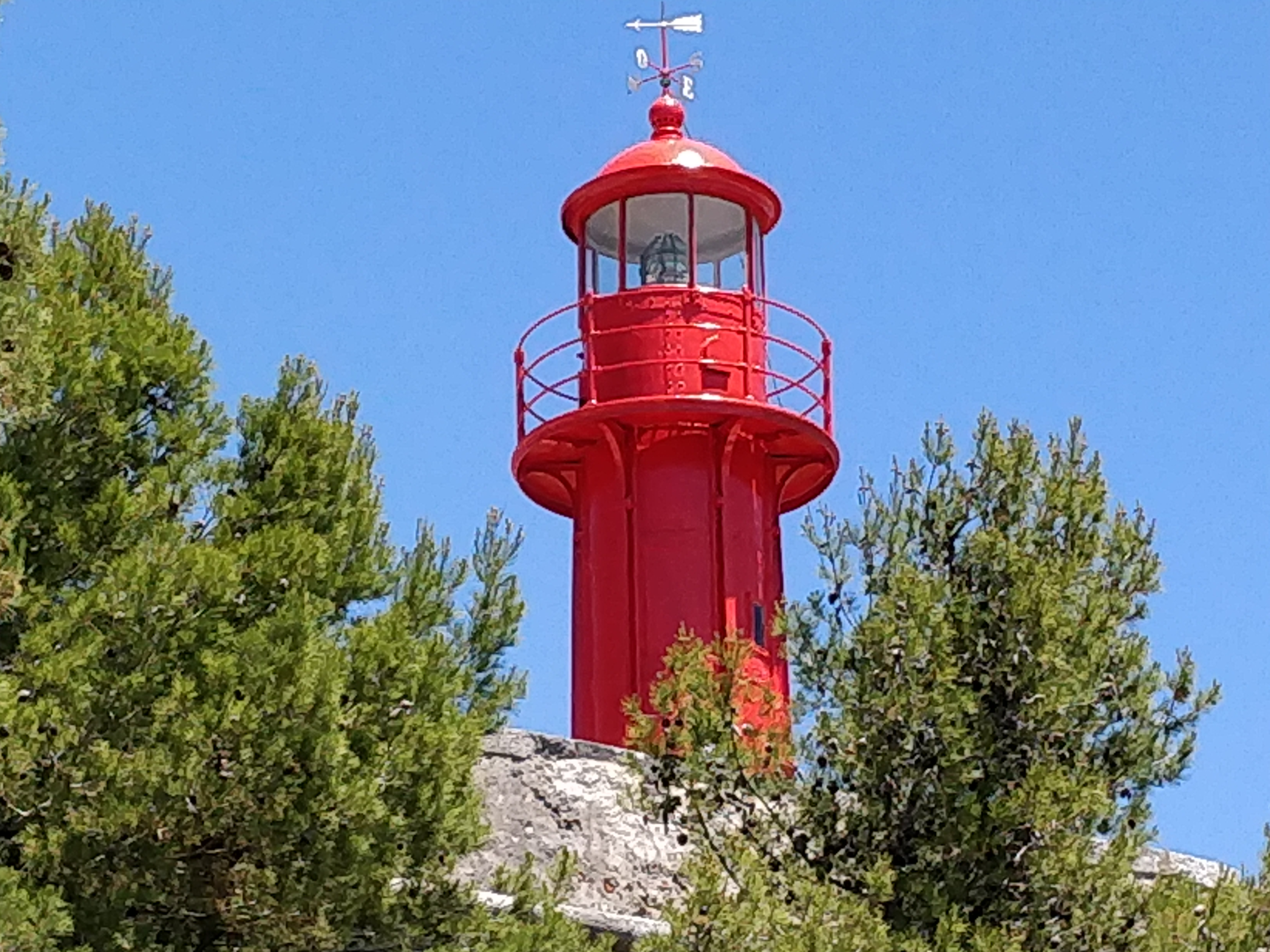
- Location: Fort of San Teodósio, Sesimbra, Portugal
- Coordinates: 38°26′05″N 9°06′59″W

Tower
- Constructed: 1895-6
- Construction: cast iron
- Automated: 1983
- Height: 7 metres (23 ft)
- Operator: Portuguese Navy
- Heritage: Immovable Cultural Heritage of Public Interest

Light
- Focal height: 35 m (115 ft)
- Lens: LED Optics
- Range: 14 nautical miles
- Characteristic: Oc W 5s

The Fort of Cavalo Lighthouse is located in the Fort of São Teodósio da Ponta do Cavalo, on the western edge of Sesimbra, in the Setúbal District of Portugal. It started operations in 1896.

== History ==
Work on installing the lighthouse and lodgings for the lighthouse keepers on the upper battery of the fort began on 12 November 1895. It began to operate on 15 September 1896 with a fixed red light beacon using a 6th-order dioptric-catadioptric Fresnel lens. The tower is cylindrical and made of iron, with vertical reinforcing strips and was originally painted white. It is 7 metres high and the light is at an altitude of 35 metres.

In the context of World War I (1914–1918), the light was not used between 1916 and 1918. In 1927 the light was modified to a fixed white light, with regular occultations. For this purpose a mechanical clockwork device was installed. In 1953 the lighthouse began to use gas to fuel the light, with acetylene gas being introduced in 1958. In 1959 the tower was painted its present red colour. The lighthouse was electrified in 1972 with a mains supply and remodelled in 1983 to use 12V/40W halogen lamps. It now has a fifth-order Fresnel reflective dioptric lens, with a focal length of 187.5 millimetres and a range of 14 nautical miles.

On 14 February 1940 the Ministry of War handed over the fort of S. Teodósio and adjacent land to the Ministry of Finance. At the same time the Ministry of Finance handed over the lighthouse and keeper's accommodation to the Ministry of the Navy.

== See also ==
- List of lighthouses in Portugal
- Directorate of Lighthouses, Portugal
