= Fortress of Saint James of Sesimbra =

Fortress in Portugal

Fortress of Saint James
- Fortaleza de Santiago
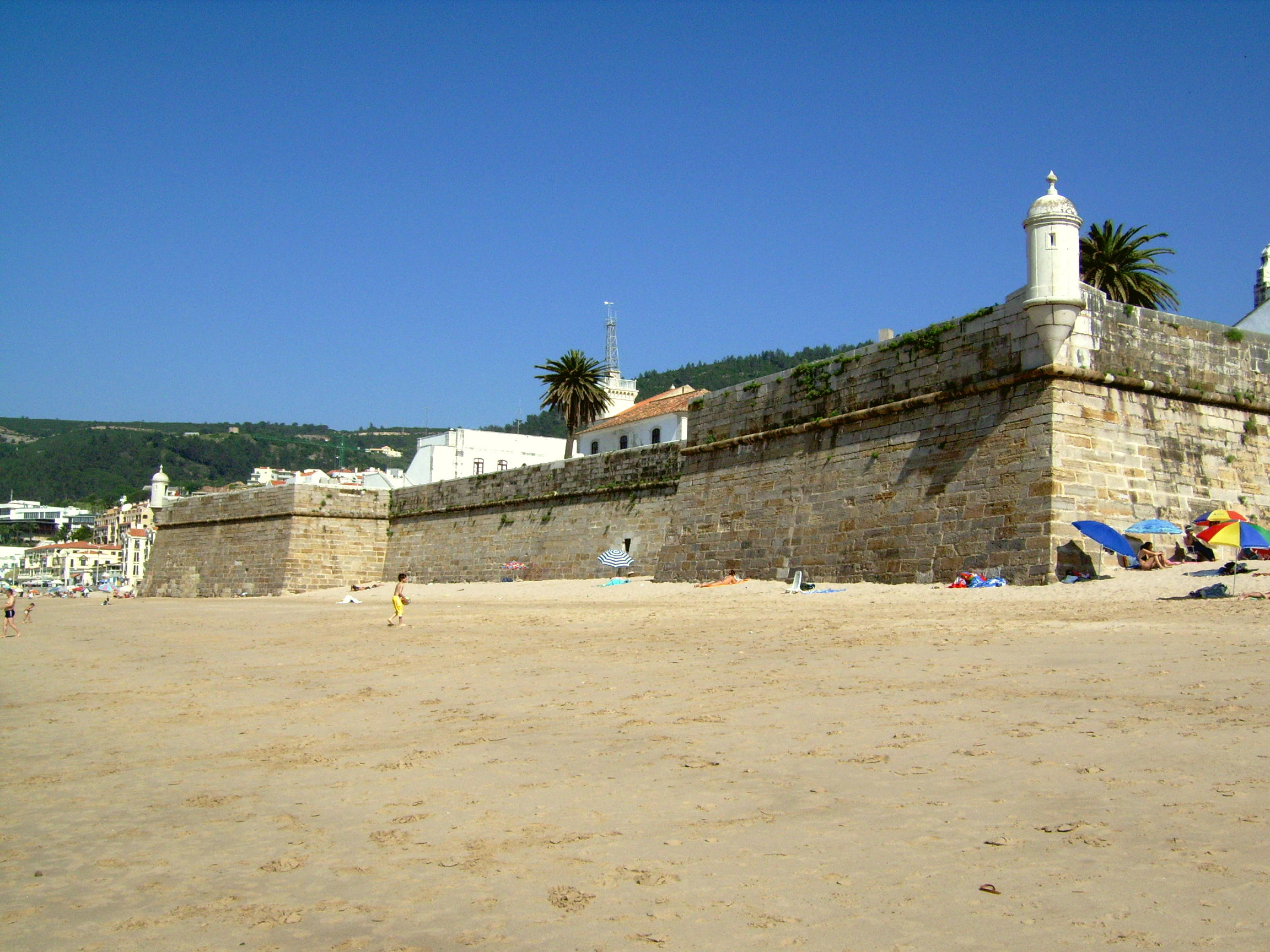
- Fortress viewed from the beach

General information
- Status: Preserved
- Type: Fortification
- Architectural style: Vauban/Renaissance
- Location: Sesimbra, Portugal
- Coordinates: 38.4429°N 9.1011°W
- Inaugurated: 1648
- Owner: Portuguese State

The Fortress of Saint James of Sesimbra (also known as the Fortress of Santiago) is a fortress located in the parish of Santiago in the coastal town and municipality of Sesimbra, in the Setúbal District of Portugal. It was built between 1642 and 1648 on the site of an earlier 16th-century Manueline fort.

== History ==
During the Anglo-Spanish War (1585-1604), the Battle of Sesimbra Bay between two English naval forces and a Spanish fleet took place on June 3, 1602. The English managed to sink two Spanish vessels, forcing the Spaniards to withdraw to the fishing village of Sesimbra, where they attacked the existing fort and caused heavy damage.

The present fort was constructed when King John IV ordered the strengthening of Portugal’s Atlantic defences in the face of attacks by the Spanish navy during the Restoration War (1640-68). In many cases this involved restructuring earlier forts and increasing their firepower. The king appointed João de Cosmander, a Dutch Jesuit military engineer, to supervise construction of the new fortress on the site of the earlier fort built by King Manuel I, with the intention that it would be capable of protecting the fishing harbour of Sesimbra from piracy and from Spanish attacks. Cosmander also worked on the Castle of Campo Maior, the Castle of Belver, and the Castle of Elvas, all major forts in Portugal.

The fort, which is oriented east-west along the beach, has a very solid structure with an austere appearance. It was developed with a polygonal star-shaped plan, with a rectangular central body and bastions, with cylindrical bartizans. The interior area was divided to make space for the residence of the Governor, the garrison barracks, cisterns, a warehouse and a chapel dedicated to Saint James. The north side of the fortress, facing the village, presents a less military appearance. The round arch gate is topped with a coat of arms with the national shield and inscription indicating the date of inauguration, 1648.

In 1712, King John V decided to install the Military Government of the region in the fortress. At that time the fort also served as a summer residence for the "Boys of Palhavã", the infant bastard sons of the king. The structure suffered damage as a result of the earthquake on 1 November 1755 that struck much of Portugal, after which it underwent reconstruction work on the north wall, the Door of Arms and the barracks of the Captain. In 1781 the north wall was replaced. In 1815 the fortification was in a state of ruin and further repairs were carried out. In 1832 the garrison left the fort, but it was subsequently re-occupied, with the last record of military occupation being 1846. In 1879 it was ceded to the Guarda Fiscal (Fiscal Guard) and passed on to the Customs Department in 1889.

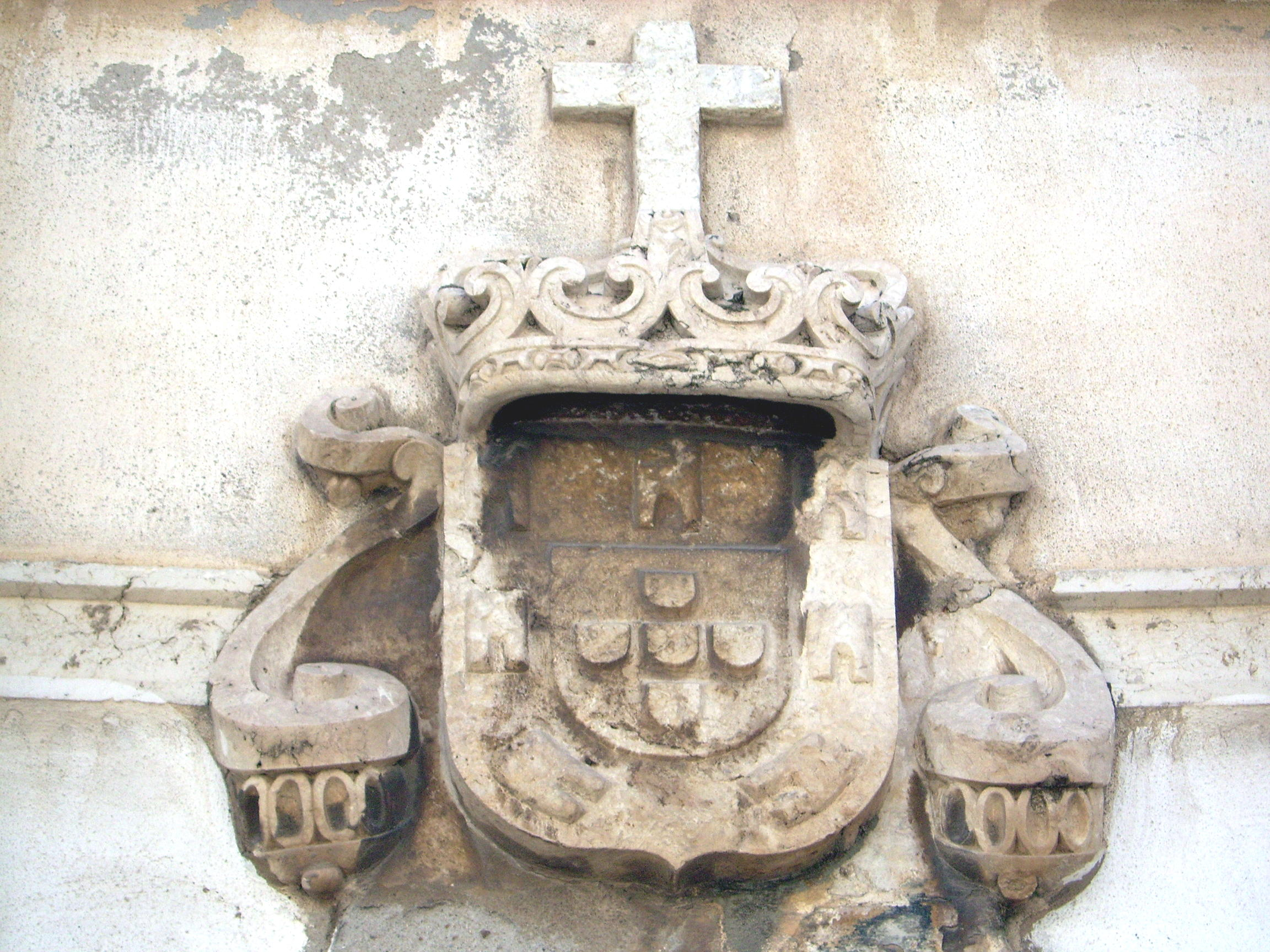
Coat of Arms over the main entrance

Some restoration work was carried out in 1930 and again in 1934-35. From 1938 it served as a summer camp for children of members of the Fiscal Guard. In the 1960s it was proposed for conversion into a hotel but no action was taken. Further repairs were carried out in 1976 and on several occasions after that, but the main restoration and conservation work began in 2011 after the fort had been handed over to the municipality. This work was funded by the European Regional Development Fund (ERDF), for about €1.5 million. The fort, which was re-opened to the public in July 2014, now houses the Museum of the Sea of Sesimbra (2015), a museum devoted to the local fishing industry, as well as a restaurant, a souvenir shop and a tourist information kiosk.
