= Rameldange =

Coordinates: 49°39′N 6°14′E

Rameldange (French pronunciation: [ʁamɛldɑ̃ʒ]; Luxembourgish: Rammeldang; German: Rammeldingen [ˈʁaml̩dɪŋən]) is a small town in the commune of Niederanven, in central Luxembourg. As of September 2026, the town has a population of 931.
