= Niederanven =

Niederanven Nidderaanwen
- Commune
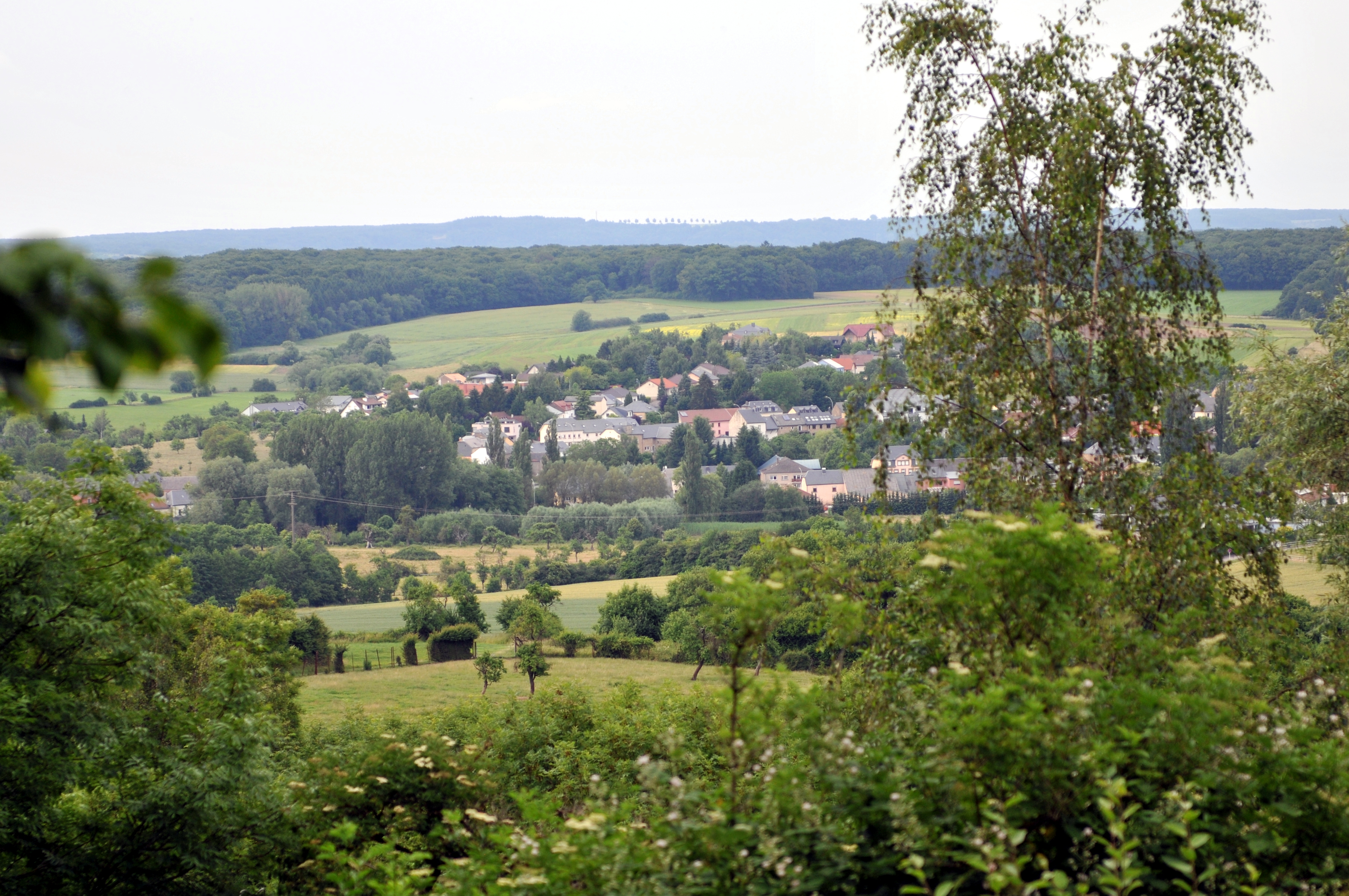

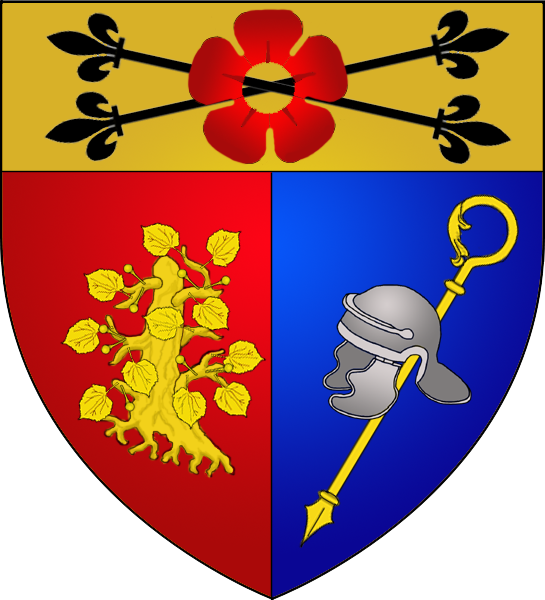
- Coat of arms Brandmark

- Map of Luxembourg with Niederanven highlighted in orange, and the canton in dark red
- Coordinates: 49.6514°N 6.2556°E
- Country: Luxembourg
- Canton: Luxembourg

Government
  - Mayor: Frédéric Ternes

Area
  - Total: 41.36 km^{2} (15.97 sq mi)
  - Rank: 12th of 100
- Highest elevation: 429 m (1,407 ft)
  - Rank: 28th of 100
- Lowest elevation: 241 m (791 ft)
  - Rank: 47th of 100

Population (2026)
  - Total: 7,143
  - Rank: 24rd of 100
  - Density: 172.7/km^{2} (447.3/sq mi)
  - Rank: 47th of 100
- Time zone: UTC+1 (CET)
  - Summer (DST): UTC+2 (CEST)
- LAU 2: LU0000305
- Website: niederanven.lu

Niederanven (German pronunciation: [ˈniːdɐˌʔanvn̩], lit. 'Lower Anven'; Luxembourgish: Nidderaanwen [nidəˈʀaːnvən]) is a commune in Luxembourg, located north-east of Luxembourg City, and derives its name from principal town, Niederanven. As of 2023, it has a population of 6,660.

The commune of Niederanven is the intersection for the A1 motorway and N1. Luxembourg Airport is located within the boundaries of the communes of Niederanven and Sandweiler.

As of 2025, Niederanven was ranked as the wealthiest commune in Luxembourg, in terms of both average and median income.

== Geography ==
As of September 2026, the town of Niederanven, which lies in the north-east of the commune, has a population of 1,556. Other towns within the commune include Ernster, Hostert, Oberanven, Rameldange, Senningen and Senningerberg, as well as the hamlet of Waldhof.

== Population ==
Historical population

Year	Pop.	±%
1821	1,580	—
1851	2,354	+49.0%
1900	1,950	−17.2%
1910	1,811	−7.1%
1922	1,762	−2.7%
1935	1,616	−8.3%

Year	Pop.	±%
1947	1,568	−3.0%
1960	1,760	+12.2%
1970	2,042	+16.0%
1981	3,393	+66.2%
1990	4,631	+36.5%
2000	5,592	+20.8%

Year	Pop.	±%
2005	5,409	−3.3%
2010	5,435	+0.5%
2015	5,737	+5.6%
2020	6,312	+10.0%
2021	6,349	+0.6%

Source data

== Twin towns – sister cities ==
Niederanven is a founding member of the Douzelage, a town twinning association of towns across the European Union. This active town twinning began in 1991 and there are regular events, such as a produce market from each of the other countries and festivals. As of 2019, its members are:

- Agros, Cyprus
- Altea, Spain
- Asikkala, Finland
- Bad Kötzting, Germany
- Bellagio, Italy
- (Republic of Ireland) Bundoran, Ireland
- Chojna, Poland
- Granville, France
- Holstebro, Denmark
- Houffalize, Belgium
- Judenburg, Austria
- Kőszeg, Hungary
- Marsaskala, Malta
- Meerssen, Netherlands
- Oxelösund, Sweden
- Preveza, Greece
- Rokiškis, Lithuania
- Rovinj, Croatia
- Sesimbra, Portugal
- Sherborne, England, United Kingdom
- Sigulda, Latvia
- Siret, Romania
- Škofja Loka, Slovenia
- Sušice, Czech Republic
- Tryavna, Bulgaria
- Türi, Estonia
- Zvolen, Slovakia

== Notable people ==
- Émile Speller (1875–1952), a Luxembourgish military officer and the commander of the country's Gendarmes and Volunteers Corps
- Jeng Kirchen (1919 in Hostert – 2010), a Luxembourgish road racing cyclist
