= Sesimbra =

Municipality in Setúbal, Portugal

- Municipality
- View of Sesimbra

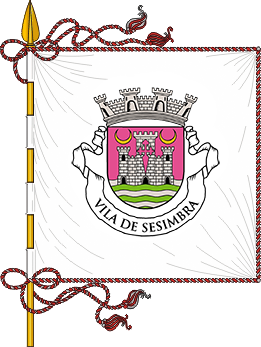
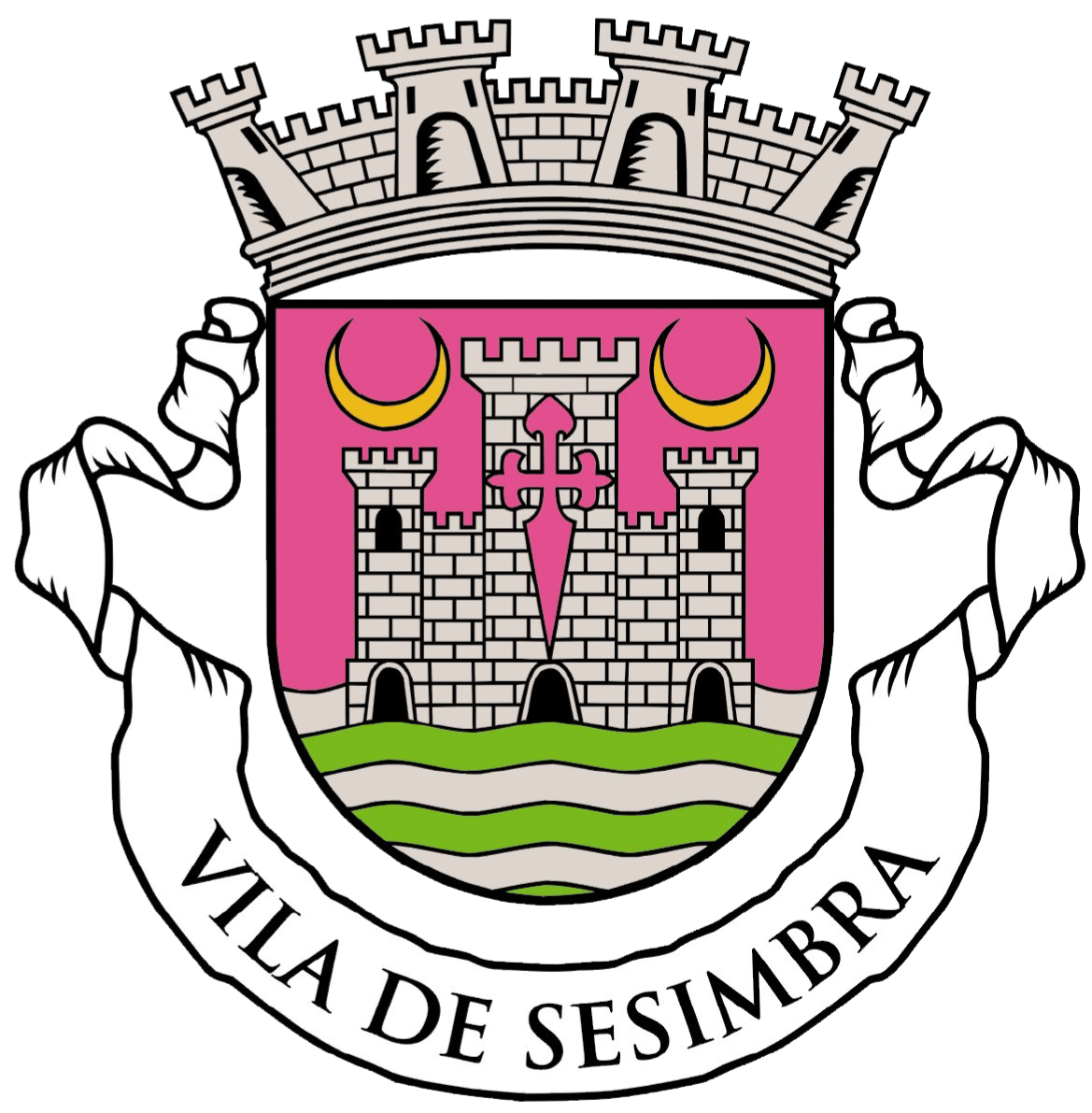
- Flag Coat of arms
- Interactive map of Sesimbra
- Coordinates: 38°26′37.4″N 9°5′58.7″W
- Country: Portugal
- Region: Lisbon
- Metropolitan area: Lisbon
- District: Setúbal
- Parishes: 3

Government
  - President: Francisco Jesus (CDU)

Area
  - Total: 195.47 km^{2} (75.47 sq mi)

Population (2011)
  - Total: 49,500
  - Density: 253/km^{2} (656/sq mi)
- Time zone: UTC+00:00 (WET)
  - Summer (DST): UTC+01:00 (WEST)
- Local holiday: May 4
- Website: http://www.cm-sesimbra.pt

Sesimbra (Portuguese pronunciation: [sɨˈzĩbɾɐ]) is a municipality of Portugal, in the Setúbal District, lying at the foothills of the Serra da Arrábida, a mountain range between Setúbal and Sesimbra. Due to its particular position at the Setúbal Bay, near the mouth of the Sado River and its natural harbour, it is an important fishing town. The population in 2011 was 49,500, in an area of 195.47 km². The present Mayor is Francisco Jesus.

== General information ==
Besides professional fishing and sport fishing (mainly of swordfish), the most significant revenues in Sesimbra come from tourism. The town is known for its beaches, fish restaurants and nightlife.

The original recorded name was Cempsibriga, a compound of the widespread Celtic element -briga "high place, fortification" and the Lusitanian or Celtic tribal name Cempsi (maybe from the Celtic root *kemm).

Close by, on a mountaintop, 240 m (787.40 ft) above sea level, lies strategically (the ruins of) the Moorish castle. It was taken from the Moors, during the Portuguese Reconquista in the year 1165 by king Afonso Henriques with the help of Frank Crusaders. The battlements afford a panorama over Sesimbra, its harbour and the surrounding countryside. In addition to the castle, Sesimbra has two forts dating back to the 17th century; the Fortress of Saint James of Sesimbra in the centre of town and the Fort of São Teodósio da Ponta do Cavalo. The former contains a museum covering Sesimbra's history as a fishing village.

During the Age of Discoveries, Sesimbra became an important seaport. Even king Manuel I lived here for a while. In the 17th century the fort Fortaleza de Santiago was built along the beach, as part of Portugal's coastal defence. On 3 June 1602 an English fleet defeated a Spanish galley fleet and in addition captured a large Portuguese carrack and severely damaged the fort. It was even used in the 18th century by Portuguese kings as a seaside retreat.

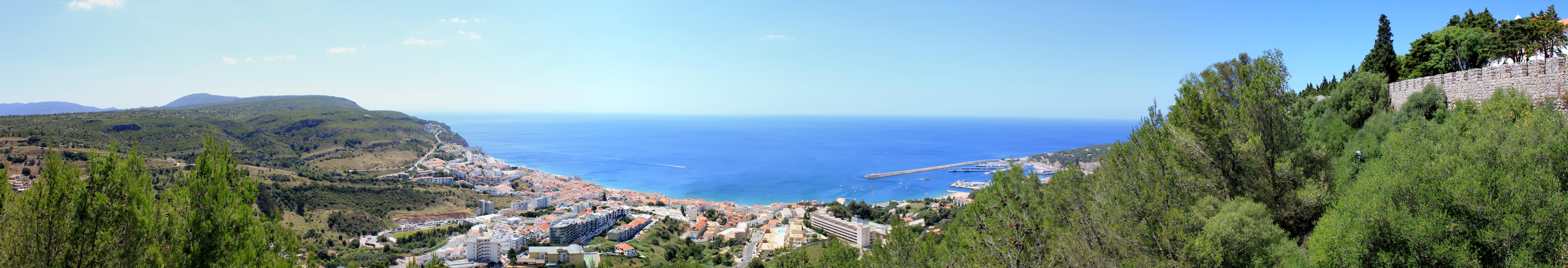
Panoramic view of Sesimbra, Portugal.

A tourist travelling to Sesimbra can appreciate its beaches, traditional fish restaurants and the Arrábida National Park. Sesimbra is a popular diving location close to Lisbon and the most famous dive site is the wreck of the River Gurara, a Nigerian cargo ship, that sunk in 1989 with the loss of 45 sailors.

Close to the Moorish castle is the church Nossa Senhora do Castelo. It stands on the spot where king Sancho I built a Romanesque chapel in the early 13th century, leading to the creation in 1388 of the parish of Nossa Senhora do Castelo de Sesimbra. The present church was built in 1721. When a new church was built in the village, this church passed into disuse and fell into ruins. It was restored between 1965 and 2001. The walls of the church are inlaid with azulejos. The 17th century-pulpit was made from local pink marble. The gilded triumphal arch of the 18th century-choir is decorated with Manueline motives. On the left side of the choir stands in a niche the gilded and polychromed statue of the Madonna of the Castle on a giant shell.

Sesimbra serves as the landing point for the submarine communications cables, such as SAT-3/WASC and Atlantis-2.

There is a local radio station in the municipality, Sesimbra FM.

== Parishes ==
Administratively, the municipality is divided into 3 civil parishes (freguesias):

- Castelo
- Quinta do Conde
- Santiago

== International relations ==
=== Twin towns - Sister cities ===
Sesimbra is a founding member of the Douzelage, a unique town twinning association of 24 towns across the European Union. This active town twinning began in 1991 and there are regular events, such as a produce market from each of the other countries and festivals. Discussions regarding membership are also in hand with three further towns (Agros in Cyprus, Škofja Loka in Slovenia, and Tryavna in Bulgaria).

Altea, Spain - 1991
Bad Kötzting, Germany - 1991
Bellagio, Italy - 1991
(Republic of Ireland) Bundoran, Ireland - 1991
Granville, France - 1991
Holstebro, Denmark - 1991
Houffalize, Belgium - 1991
Meerssen, the Netherlands - 1991
Niederanven, Luxembourg - 1991
Preveza, Greece - 1991
Sesimbra, Portugal - 1991
Sherborne, United Kingdom - 1991
Karkkila, Finland - 1997
Oxelösund, Sweden - 1998
Judenburg, Austria - 1999
Chojna, Poland - 2004
Kőszeg, Hungary - 2004
Sigulda, Latvia - 2004
Sušice, Czech Republic - 2004
Türi, Estonia - 2004
Zvolen, Slovakia - 2007
Rokiškis, Lithuania - 2018
Marsaskala, Malta - 2009
Siret, Romania - 2010

== Notable people ==
- Sebastião Rodrigues Soromenho (ca.1560–1602) a Portuguese explorer appointed by the King Philip II of Spain to sail along the shores of California in the years 1595 and 1596 to map the American west coast line
- twins Marco Paixão & Flávio Paixão (born 1984) Portuguese footballers, both with about 450 club caps
- Carlos Manuel (born 1976), former footballer

== Gallery ==
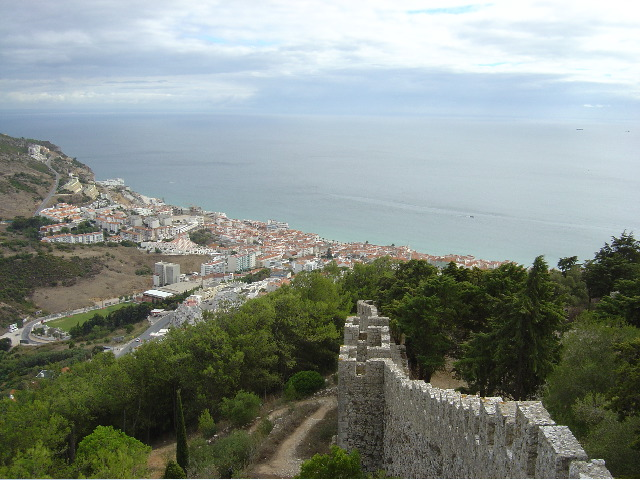
View of Sesimbra

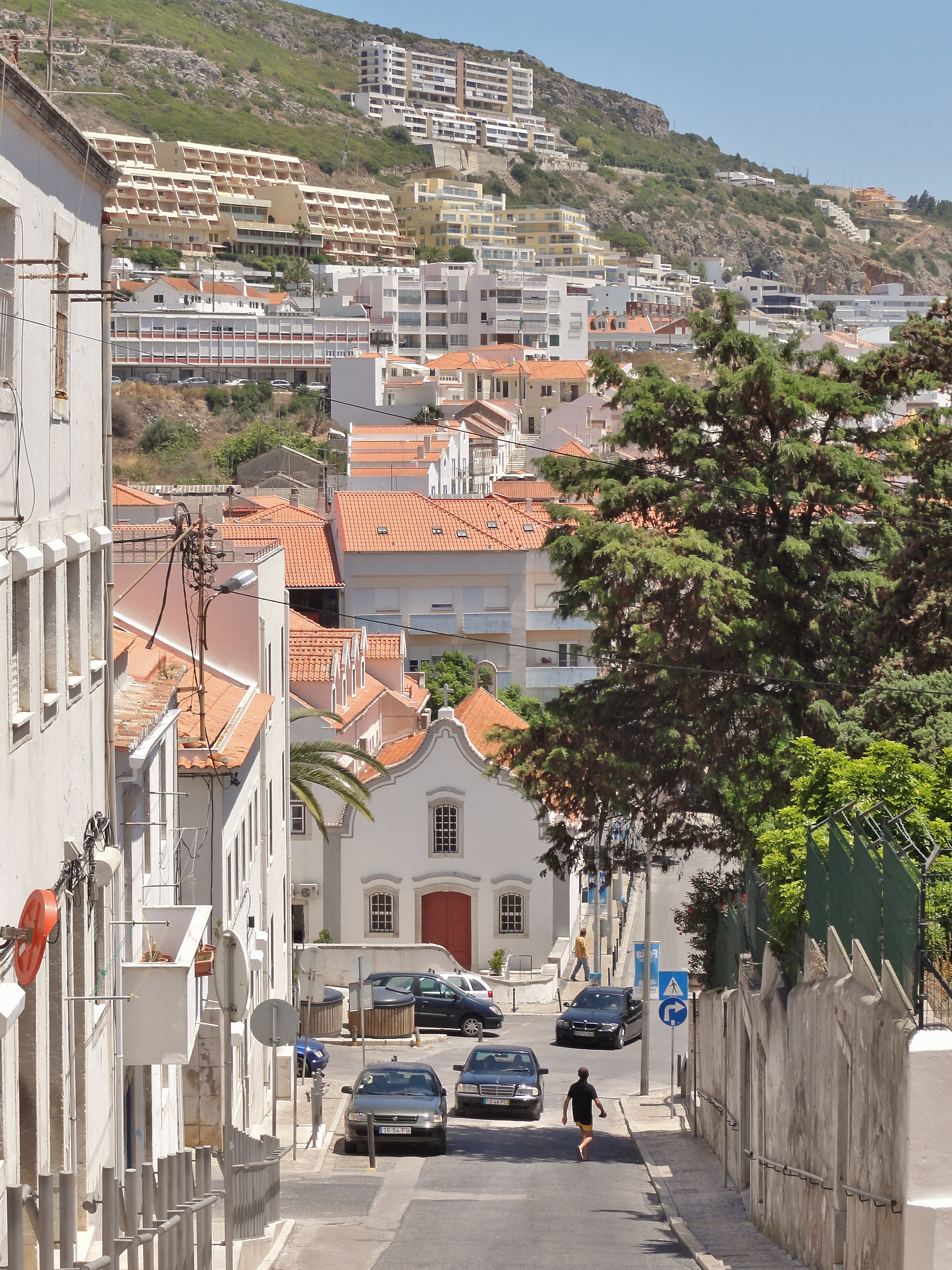
Sesimbra view from Almirante Sande Vasconcelos street

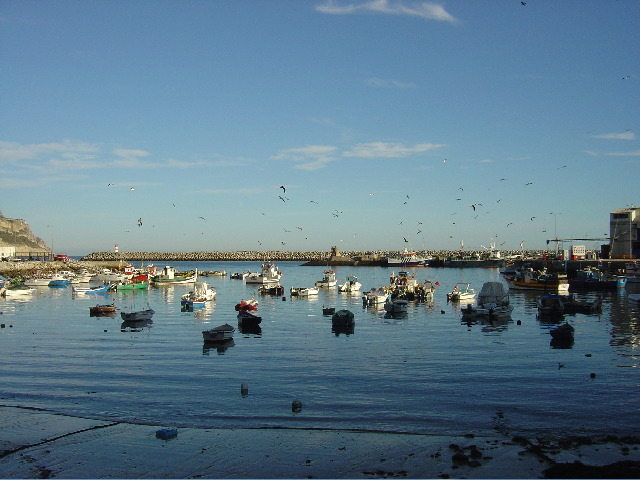
Sesimbra's harbour

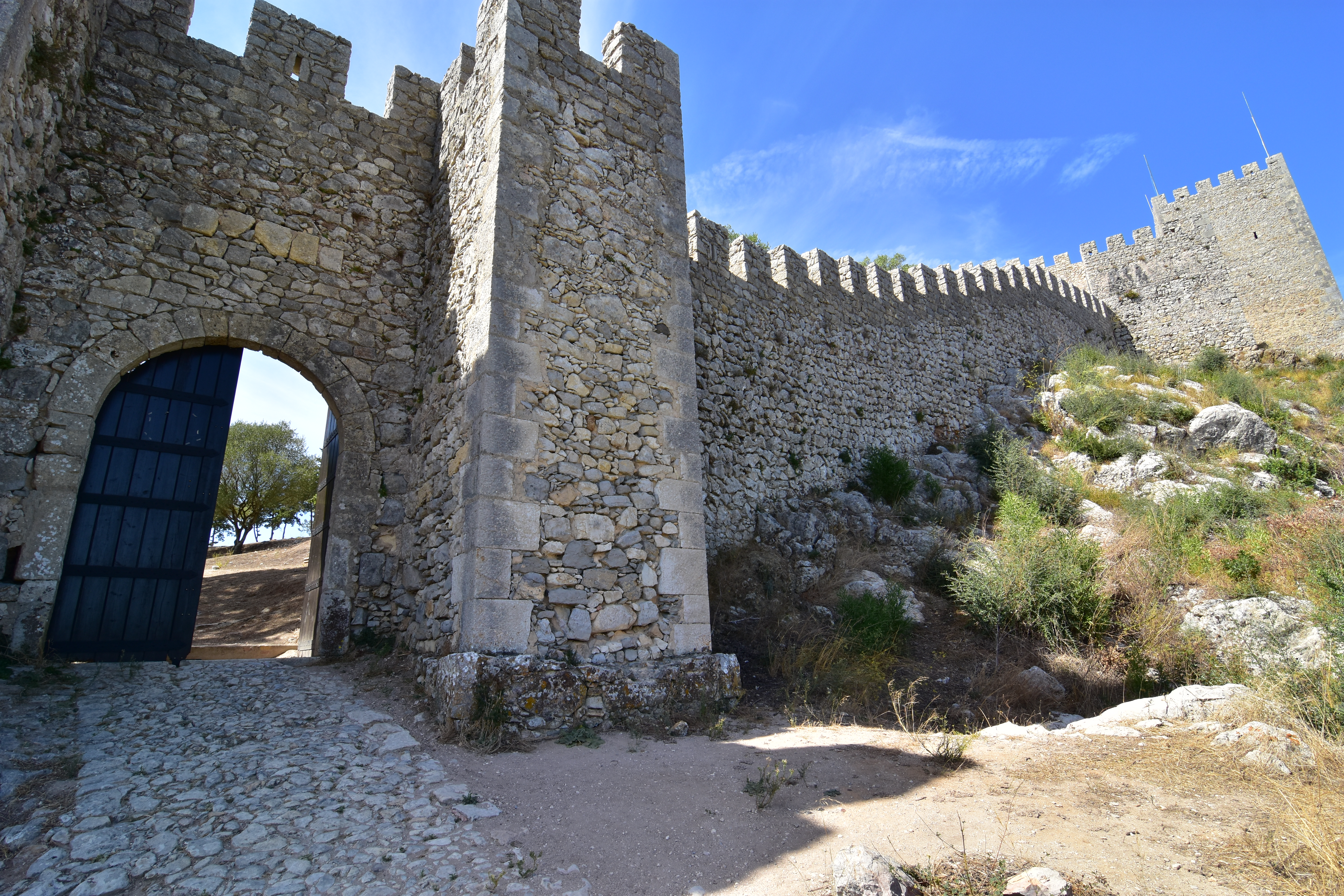
Moorish castle

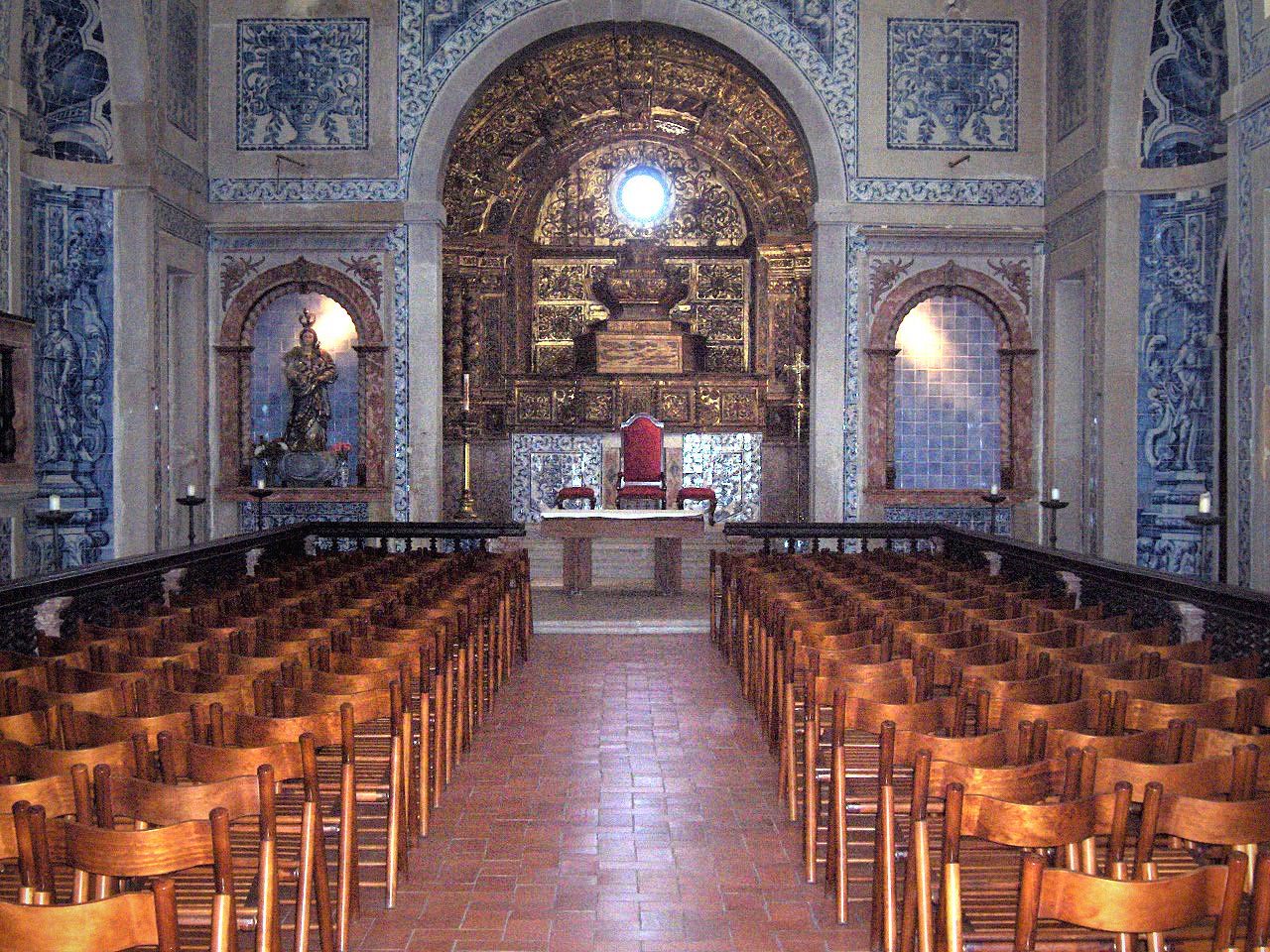
Church of Nossa Senhora do Castelo

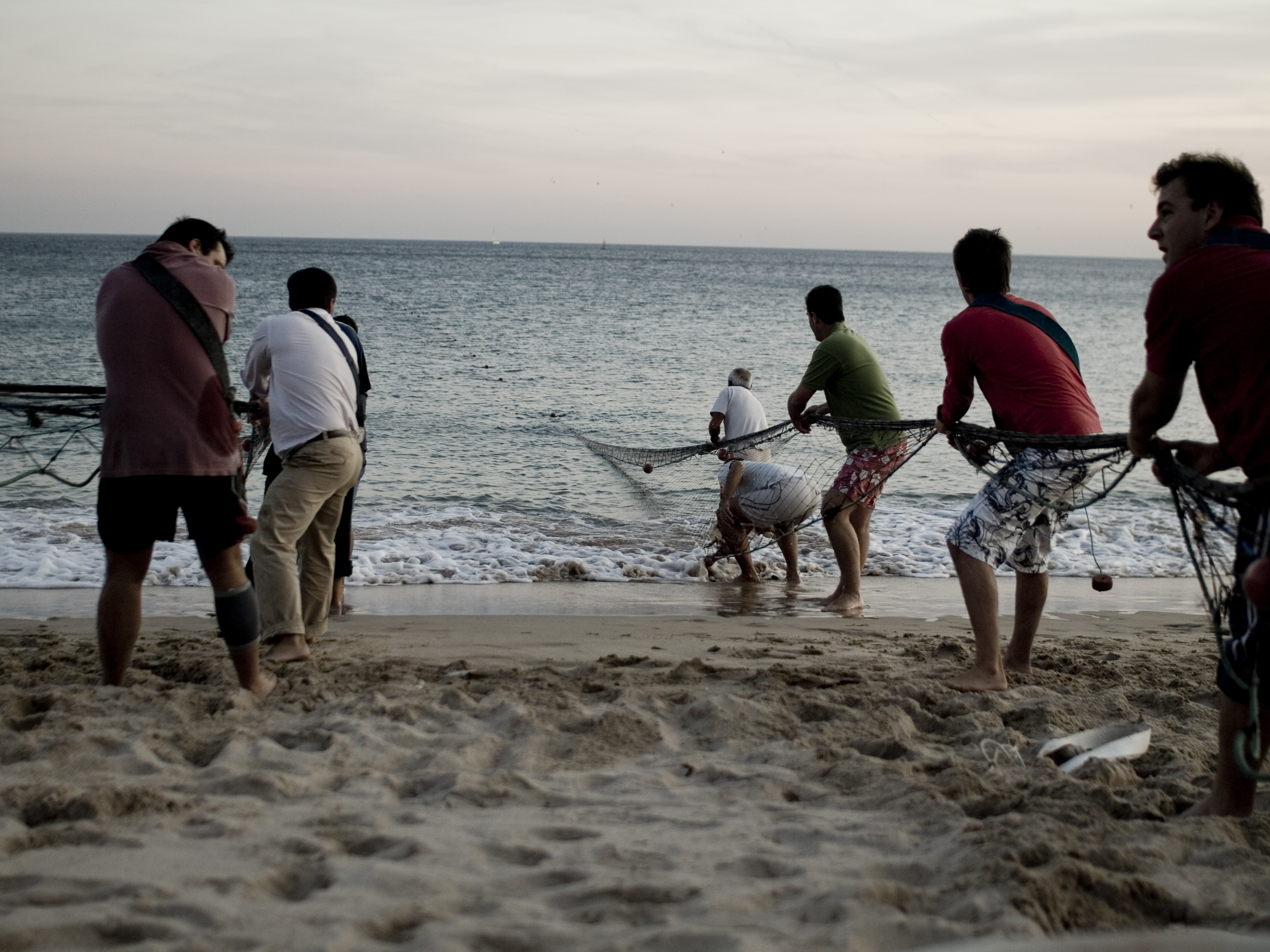
Fishermen in Sesimbra

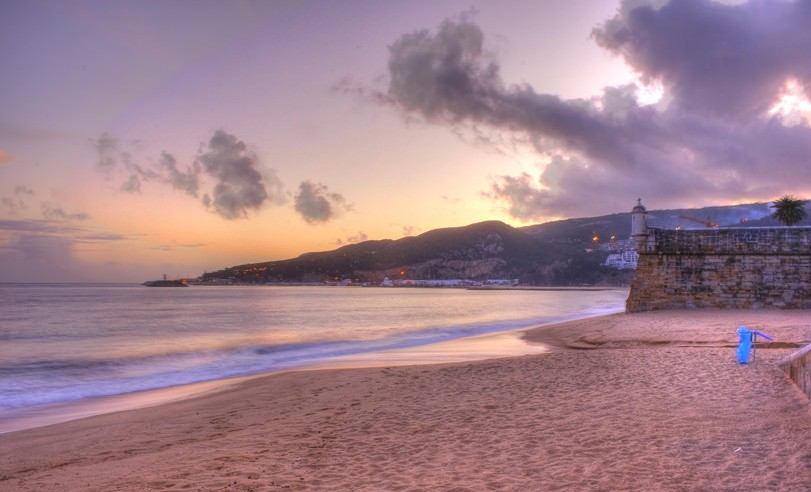
Sesimbra, Portugal

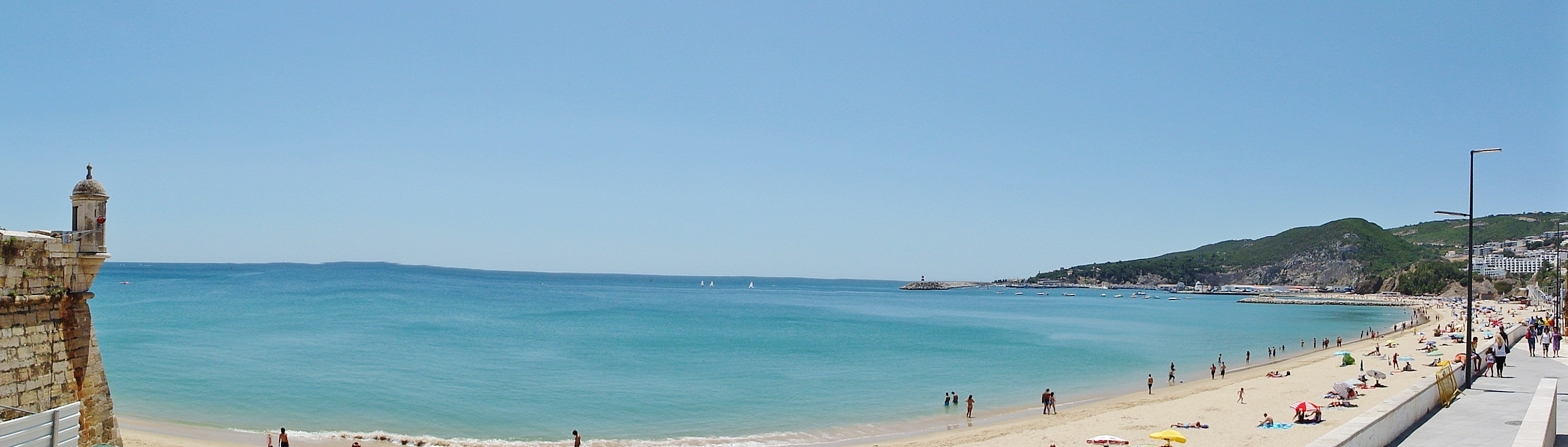
The Gold Beach coastline (Praia do Ouro) at Sesimbra, traditional Portuguese fishing village bay, part of the Blue Coast region
