= Drozdowo, Gryfino County =

Drozdowo
- Abandoned settlement
- Location within Poland
- Coordinates: 52°55′39″N 14°28′31″E
- Country: Poland
- Voivodeship: West Pomeranian
- County: Gryfino
- Gmina: Chojna
- Population (2023): 0

Drozdowo [drɔzˈdɔvɔ] (German: Finkenstein) is an abandoned settlement in the Gmina Chojna, within Gryfino County, West Pomeranian Voivodeship, in north-western Poland, close to the German border. The former settlement is notable for its manor house which, like the rest of Drozdowo, lies in ruin.

== Geography ==
Drozdowo is located in a forest, historically known by the German name Göllinsche Forst, about 2 km (1 mi) north-west of the Jezioro Jeleńskie lake.

The settlement lies approximately 5 km (3 mi) south-east of the municipal centre in Chojna, 36 km (22 mi) south of the powiat capital Gryfino, and 55 km (34 mi) south of the regional capital Szczecin. Its nearest settlements are Boguszczyn about 1.5 km (1 mi) to the north, Jelonki about 1 km (1 mi) east, and Jelenin about 2 km (1 mi) to the south.

About 1.5 km (1 mi) west of the settlement lies the Wrocław–Szczecin railway, with the nearest stop being in Godków, as well as the national road nr. 31.

Administratively, Drozdowo belongs to the sołectwo of Czartoryja of Gmina Chojna in Gryfino County of the West Pomeranian Voivodeship.

== History ==
Drozdowo, then known by its German name Finkenstein, is attested as having been owned by the von Tilly family during the early 20th century. Their estate encompassed 240 hectares (593 acres) of land, 191 ha (472 acres) thereof were fields or gardens, 20 ha (49 acres) forests, 15 ha (37 acres) meadows, and 10 ha (25 acres) were used for buildings and roads. The settlement's single-story manor house and its 3.3 ha (8 acres) manor park are, while in ruin, recognizably preserved and publicly accessible.

As of the 1895 census, the settlement had a population of 29 and belonged to the rural municipality of Göllen (now known as Jelenin) in the district of Königsberg in der Neumark, Prussia.

After the flight and expulsion of Germans from the area as a consequence of World War II, the settlement was given its modern Polish name of Drozdowo.

Between 1975 and 1998, Drozdowo was part of the Gorzów Voivodeship. Since 1999, Drozdowo is part of Gmina Chojna, specifically the sołectwo of Czartoryja.

During the 1988 Polish census, Drozdowo had a population on 13, this decreased to 2 by 2008 according to the official website of Gmina Chojna, and by 2009, the PESEL register reported a population of 0, making it fully abandoned; this abandonment was again confirmed in the 2021 Polish census and a 2023 demographics report on the municipal website.

== Demographics ==
Historical population

Year	Pop.	±%
1898	29	—
1998	13	−55.2%
2008	2	−84.6%

Year	Pop.	±%
2009	0	−100.0%
2021	0	0.00%
2023	0	0.00%

Data may be affected by territorial fluctuation.
Sources: 1898, 1988, 2008, 2009, 2021, 2023
