= Brwice =

- Village
- Location within Poland
- Coordinates: 52°56′16″N 14°32′4″E
- Country: Poland
- Voivodeship: West Pomeranian
- County: Gryfino
- Gmina: Chojna

Brwice [ˈbrvit͡sɛ] (German: Blankenfelde) is a village in the administrative district of Gmina Chojna, within Gryfino County, West Pomeranian Voivodeship, in north-western Poland, close to the German border. It lies approximately 9 km (6 mi) east of Chojna, 35 km (22 mi) south of Gryfino, and 54 km (34 mi) south of the regional capital Szczecin.

For the history of the region, see History of Pomerania.
