= Białęgi, West Pomeranian Voivodeship =

Białęgi
- Village
- Location within Poland
- Coordinates: 52°51′45″N 14°31′45″E
- Country: Poland
- Voivodeship: West Pomeranian
- County: Gryfino
- Gmina: Chojna

Białęgi [bjaˈwɛnɡi] (German: Belgen) is a village in the administrative district of Gmina Chojna, within Gryfino County, West Pomeranian Voivodeship, in north-western Poland, close to the German border. It lies approximately 14 km (9 mi) south-east of Chojna, 44 km (27 mi) south of Gryfino, and 62 km (39 mi) south of the regional capital Szczecin.

For the history of the region, see History of Pomerania.
