= Rurka, Gryfino County =

Rurka
- Village
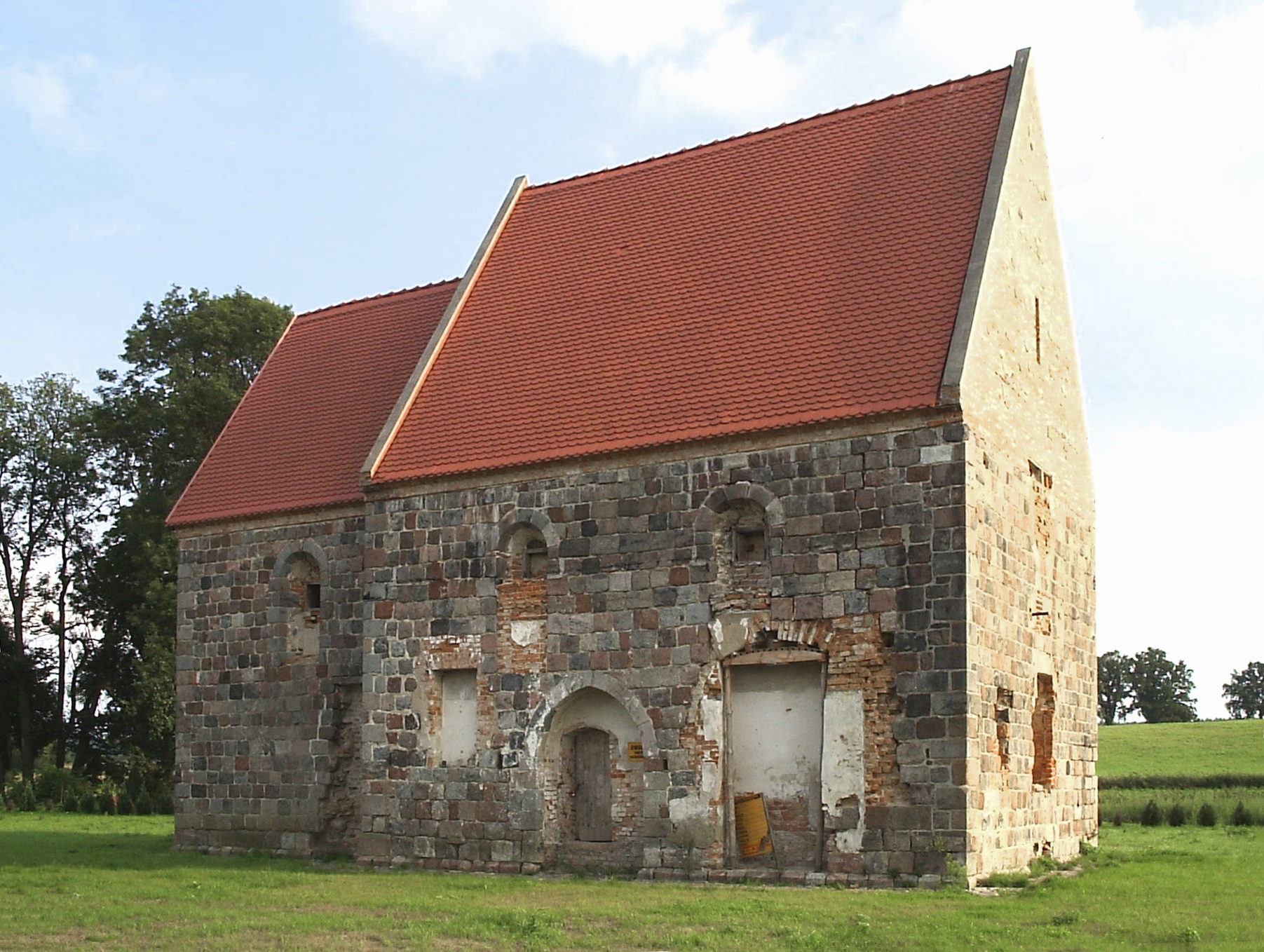
- A 1000-year-old chapel in Rurka

- Location within Poland
- Coordinates: 52°59′29″N 14°29′6″E
- Country: Poland
- Voivodeship: West Pomeranian
- County: Gryfino
- Gmina: Chojna
- Population: 210

Rurka [ˈrurka] (German: Rörchen) is a village in the administrative district of Gmina Chojna, within Gryfino County, West Pomeranian Voivodeship, in north-western Poland, close to the German border. It lies approximately 6 km (4 mi) north-east of Chojna, 29 km (18 mi) south of Gryfino, and 48 km (30 mi) south of the regional capital Szczecin.

For the history of the region, see History of Pomerania.

The village has a population of 210.

== Notable residents ==
- Peter-Eberhard Müllensiefen (1912–2004), Luftwaffe pilot
