= Ognica =

Ognica may refer to the following places:

- Ognica, Gmina Chojna in West Pomeranian Voivodeship (north-west Poland)
- Ognica, Gmina Widuchowa in West Pomeranian Voivodeship (north-west Poland)
- Ognica, Stargard County in West Pomeranian Voivodeship (north-west Poland)
