= Ostrów, West Pomeranian Voivodeship =

Ostrów
- Settlement
- Location within Poland
- Coordinates: 52°56′24″N 14°18′54″E
- Country: Poland
- Voivodeship: West Pomeranian
- County: Gryfino
- Gmina: Chojna
- Population: 4
- Time zone: UTC+1 (CET)
  - Summer (DST): UTC+2 (CEST)

Ostrów [ˈɔstruf] (German: Idaswalde) is a settlement in the administrative district of Gmina Chojna, within Gryfino County, West Pomeranian Voivodeship, in north-western Poland, close to the German border. It lies approximately 8 km (5 mi) south-west of Chojna, 37 km (23 mi) south of Gryfino, and 56 km (35 mi) south of the regional capital Szczecin.

The settlement has a population of 4.
