= Lisie Pole =

- Village
- Location within Poland
- Coordinates: 53°1′47″N 14°26′35″E
- Country: Poland
- Voivodeship: West Pomeranian
- County: Gryfino
- Gmina: Chojna
- Population (approx.): 600

Lisie Pole [ˈliɕɛ ˈpɔlɛ] is a village in the administrative district of Gmina Chojna, within Gryfino County, West Pomeranian Voivodeship, in north-western Poland, close to the German border. It lies approximately 8 km (5 mi) north of Chojna, 25 km (16 mi) south of Gryfino, and 44 km (27 mi) south of the regional capital Szczecin.

For the history of the region, see History of Pomerania.

The village has an approximate population of 600.
