= Stoki, West Pomeranian Voivodeship =

Stoki
- Village
- Location within Poland
- Coordinates: 52°57′0″N 14°20′39″E
- Country: Poland
- Voivodeship: West Pomeranian
- County: Gryfino
- Gmina: Chojna
- Population (2023): 91

Stoki [ˈstɔki] (German: Försterei Rehdorf) is a village in Gmina Chojna, within Gryfino County, West Pomeranian Voivodeship, in north-western Poland, close to the German border. It lies approximately 6 km (4 mi) west of Chojna, 35 km (22 mi) south of Gryfino, and 55 km (34 mi) south of the regional capital Szczecin.

For the history of the region, see History of Pomerania.

== Demographics ==
Historical population

Year	Pop.	±%
1895	113	—
1910	114	+0.9%
1925	361	+216.7%
1933	311	−13.9%

Year	Pop.	±%
1939	292	−6.1%
2011	98	−66.4%
2021	107	+9.2%
2023	91	−15.0%

Data may be affected by territorial fluctuation.
Sources: 1895, 2021 2023
