= Łaziszcze =

- Village
- Location within Poland
- Coordinates: 52°54′10″N 14°19′43″E
- Country: Poland
- Voivodeship: West Pomeranian
- County: Gryfino
- Gmina: Chojna

Łaziszcze [waˈʑiʂt͡ʂɛ] is a village in the administrative district of Gmina Chojna, within Gryfino County, West Pomeranian Voivodeship, in north-western Poland, close to the German border. It lies approximately 10 km (6 mi) south-west of Chojna, 40 km (25 mi) south of Gryfino, and 60 km (37 mi) south of the regional capital Szczecin.

For the history of the region, see History of Pomerania.
