= Nawodna =

- Village
- Location within Poland
- Coordinates: 53°0′48″N 14°23′59″E
- Country: Poland
- Voivodeship: West Pomeranian
- County: Gryfino
- Gmina: Chojna
- Population: 730

Nawodna [naˈvɔdna] is a village in the administrative district of Gmina Chojna, within Gryfino County, West Pomeranian Voivodeship, in north-western Poland, close to the German border. It lies approximately 6 km (4 mi) north of Chojna, 27 km (17 mi) south of Gryfino, and 47 km (29 mi) south of the regional capital Szczecin.

For the history of the region, see History of Pomerania.
