= Raduń, Gryfino County =

Raduń
- Village
- Location within Poland
- Coordinates: 52°59′44″N 14°14′36″E
- Country: Poland
- Voivodeship: West Pomeranian
- County: Gryfino
- Gmina: Chojna
- Population: 10

Raduń [ˈraduɲ] is a village in the administrative district of Gmina Chojna, within Gryfino County, West Pomeranian Voivodeship, in north-western Poland, close to the German border. It lies approximately 13 km (8 mi) west of Chojna, 33 km (21 mi) south-west of Gryfino, and 52 km (32 mi) south-west of the regional capital Szczecin.

For the history of the region, see History of Pomerania.

The village has a population of 10.
