= Grzybno, Gryfino County =

Grzybno
- Village
- Location within Poland
- Coordinates: 53°1′7″N 14°33′24″E
- Country: Poland
- Voivodeship: West Pomeranian
- County: Gryfino
- Gmina: Chojna

Grzybno [ˈɡʐɨbnɔ] (German: Thänsdorf) is a village in the administrative district of Gmina Chojna, within Gryfino County, West Pomeranian Voivodeship, in north-western Poland, close to the German border. It lies approximately 12 km (7 mi) north-east of Chojna, 27 km (17 mi) south of Gryfino, and 45 km (28 mi) south of the regional capital Szczecin.

For the history of the region, see History of Pomerania.
