= Zatoń Dolna =

- Village
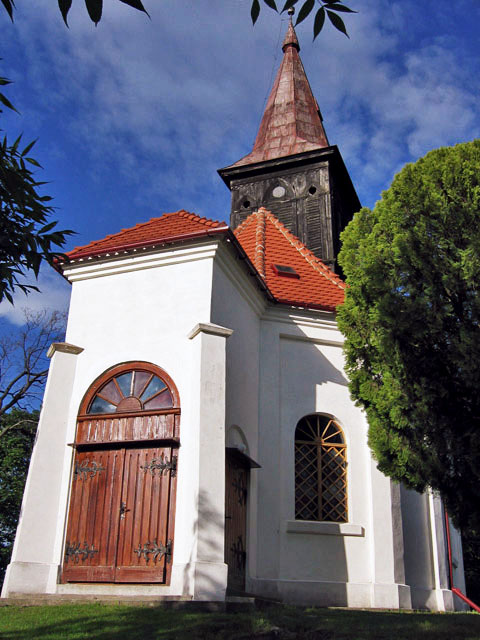
- Church

- Location within Poland
- Coordinates: 53°0′42″N 14°16′35″E
- Country: Poland
- Voivodeship: West Pomeranian
- County: Gryfino
- Gmina: Chojna

Zatoń Dolna [ˈzatɔɲ ˈdɔlna] (German: Nieder Saathen) is a village in the administrative district of Gmina Chojna, within Gryfino County, West Pomeranian Voivodeship, in north-western Poland, close to the German border. It lies approximately 11 km (7 mi) north-west of Chojna, 30 km (19 mi) south-west of Gryfino, and 50 km (31 mi) south-west of the regional capital Szczecin.

For the history of the region, see History of Pomerania.
