= Krzymów, West Pomeranian Voivodeship =

Krzymów
- Village
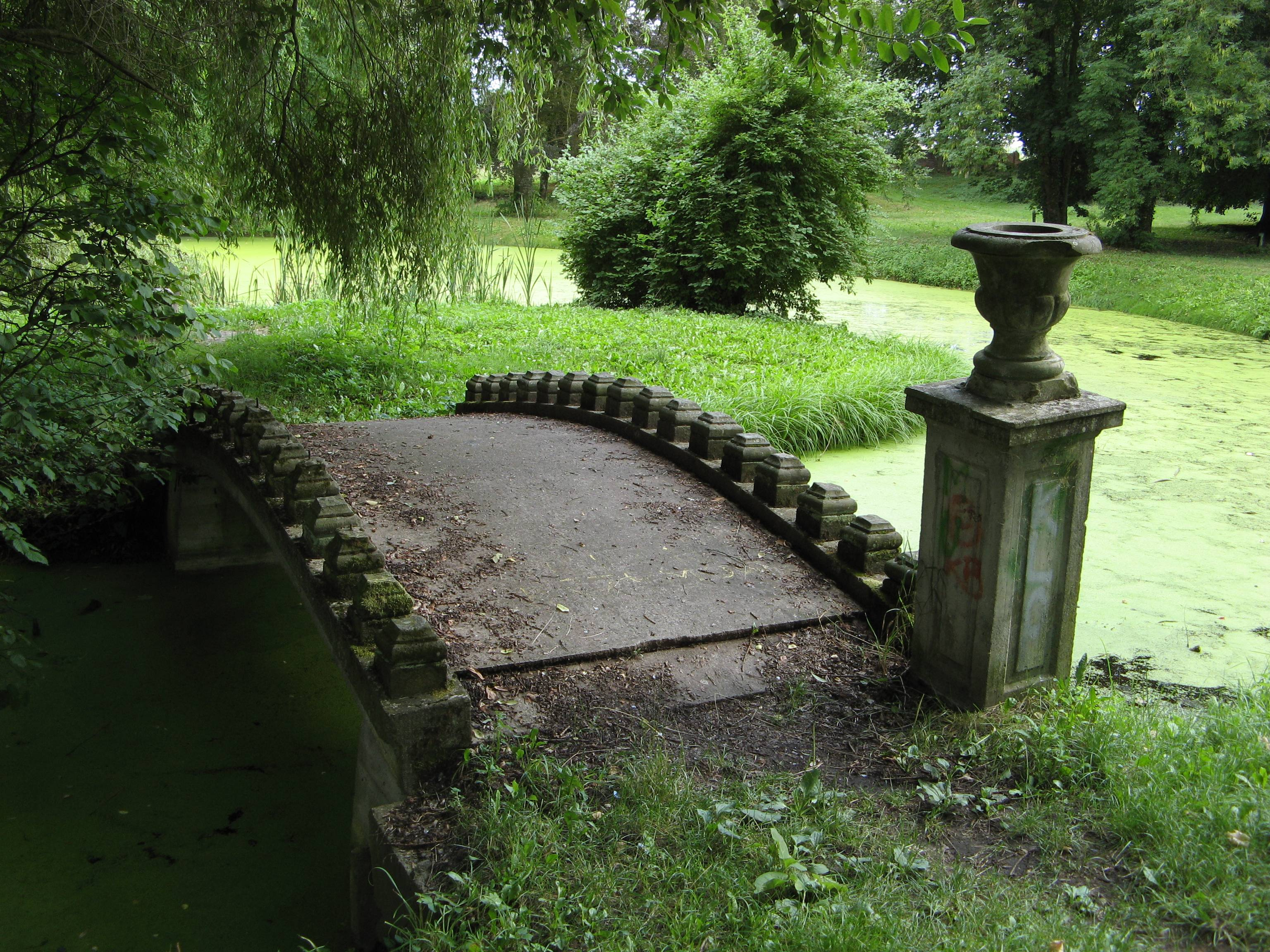
- Park in Krzymów

- Location within Poland
- Coordinates: 52°58′48″N 14°19′52″E
- Country: Poland
- Voivodeship: West Pomeranian
- County: Gryfino
- Gmina: Chojna
- Time zone: UTC+1 (CET)
  - Summer (DST): UTC+2 (CEST)
- Vehicle registration: ZGR

Krzymów [ˈkʂɨmuf] is a village in the administrative district of Gmina Chojna, within Gryfino County, West Pomeranian Voivodeship, in north-western Poland, close to the German border. It lies approximately 6 km (4 mi) west of Chojna, 32 km (20 mi) south of Gryfino, and 52 km (32 mi) south of the regional capital Szczecin.

It is located in the historic region of Pomerania.
