= Wilcze =

Wilcze may refer to the following places:

- Wilcze, Greater Poland Voivodeship (west-central Poland)
- Wilcze, Kuyavian-Pomeranian Voivodeship (north-central Poland)
- Wilcze, Gmina Osielsko in Kuyavian-Pomeranian Voivodeship (north-central Poland)
- Wilcze, Warmian-Masurian Voivodeship (north Poland)
- Wilcze, Gmina Chojna in West Pomeranian Voivodeship (north-west Poland)
- Wilcze, Gmina Widuchowa in West Pomeranian Voivodeship (north-west Poland)
