= Nordhausen =

Nordhausen may refer to:

- Nordhausen (district), a district in Thuringia, Germany
  - Nordhausen, Thuringia, a city in the district
  - Nordhausen station, the railway station in the city
- Nordhouse, a commune in Alsace (German: Nordhausen)
- Narost, a village in Poland (formerly Nordhausen)
- Mittelbau-Dora concentration camp, a Nazi concentration camp located near the city
  - Mittelwerk, an underground factory during World War II
  - Nordhausen concentration camp, a subcamp of Mittelbau-Dora
- Nordhausen, an album by And One
- Jorge Nordhausen, a Mexican politician
