= Czartoryja, West Pomeranian Voivodeship =

Czartoryja
- Village
- Location within Poland
- Coordinates: 52°57′6″N 14°30′23″E
- Country: Poland
- Voivodeship: West Pomeranian
- County: Gryfino
- Gmina: Chojna

Czartoryja [t͡ʂartɔˈrɨja] (German: Wedell) is a village in the administrative district of Gmina Chojna, within Gryfino County, West Pomeranian Voivodeship, in north-western Poland, close to the German border. It lies approximately 7 km (4 mi) east of Chojna, 34 km (21 mi) south of Gryfino, and 52 km (32 mi) south of the regional capital Szczecin.

For the history of the region, see History of Pomerania.
