= Jelenin, West Pomeranian Voivodeship =

Jelenin
- Village
- Location within Poland
- Coordinates: 52°54′30″N 14°29′12″E
- Country: Poland
- Voivodeship: West Pomeranian
- County: Gryfino
- Gmina: Chojna
- Population: 70

Jelenin [jɛˈlɛnin] is a village in the administrative district of Gmina Chojna, within Gryfino County, West Pomeranian Voivodeship, in north-western Poland, close to the German border. It lies approximately 8 km (5 mi) south-east of Chojna, 38 km (24 mi) south of Gryfino, and 57 km (35 mi) south of the regional capital Szczecin.

For the history of the region, see History of Pomerania.

The village has a population of 70.

== Notable people ==
- Czesław Hoc (born 1954 in Jelenin) a Polish politician, elected to the Sejm in 2005
