= Helmut Fiehn =

Helmuth Fiehn
- Born: 19 February 1916; Königsberg (Neumark) (now Chojna)
- Died: April 23, 1943 (aged 27); North Atlantic
- Relatives: John Fiehn (brother)
- Military career
- Branch: Kriegsmarine
- Service years: 1935–1943
- Rank: Kapitänleutnant
- Commands: U-191
- Awards: Iron Cross, 2nd class

Helmut Fiehn (19 February 1916 – 23 April 1943) was a Kapitänleutnant (captain lieutenant) in Nazi Germany's Kriegsmarine during World War II.

He was born on 19 February 1916 in Königsberg, Germany. In 1935 he joined the German military as a trainee in the Luftwaffe, where he rose to the rank of Oberleutnant in 1939. At the outbreak of the war, Fiehn transferred to the Kriegsmarine where he was given the rank of Kapitänleutnant and awarded the Iron Cross 2nd Class. In 1942 he was given commission of U-191. After departing form Bergen on 17 March 1943, U-191 was attacked and destroyed by HMS Hesperus, and Fiehn died along with the entire crew on 23 April 1943.

Helmut Fiehn is the older brother of former German journalist John Fiehn, who is known for being the first journalist to report the construction of the Berlin Wall during the Cold War.

== Bibliography ==
- Busch, Rainer; Röll, Hans-Joachim (1999). German U-boat commanders of World War II : a biographical dictionary. Translated by Brooks, Geoffrey. London, Annapolis, Md: Greenhill Books, Naval Institute Press. ISBN 1-55750-186-6.
