= Hinrich Brunsberg =

German architect

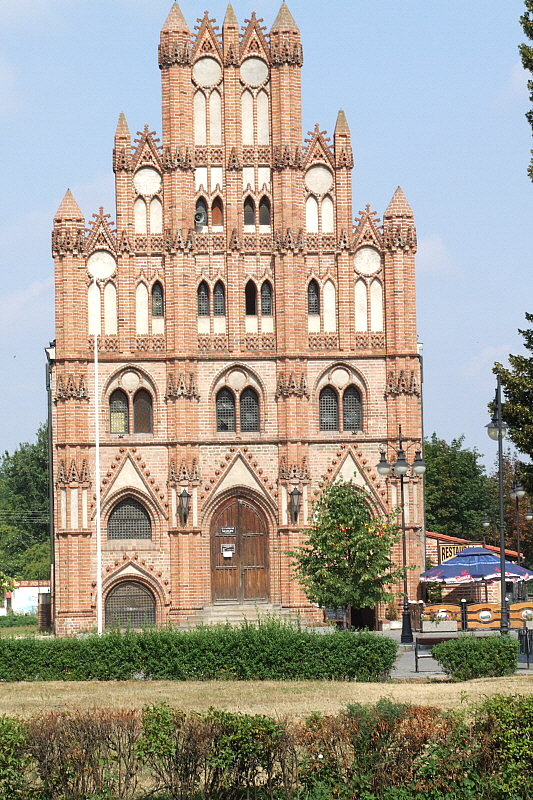
The former town hall and current cultural centre in Chojna

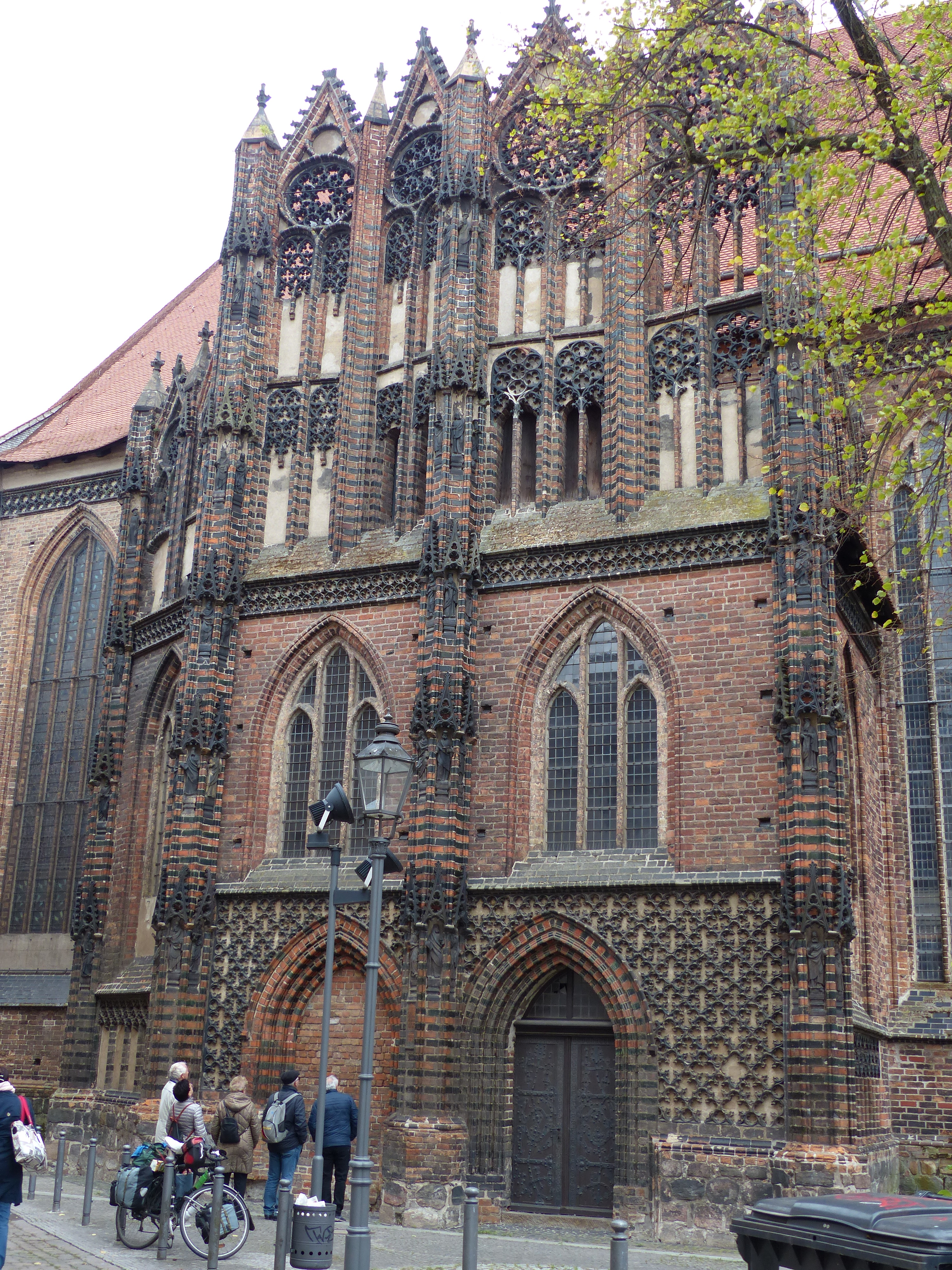
Marienkapelle of the St. Katharinen (Brandenburg an der Havel)

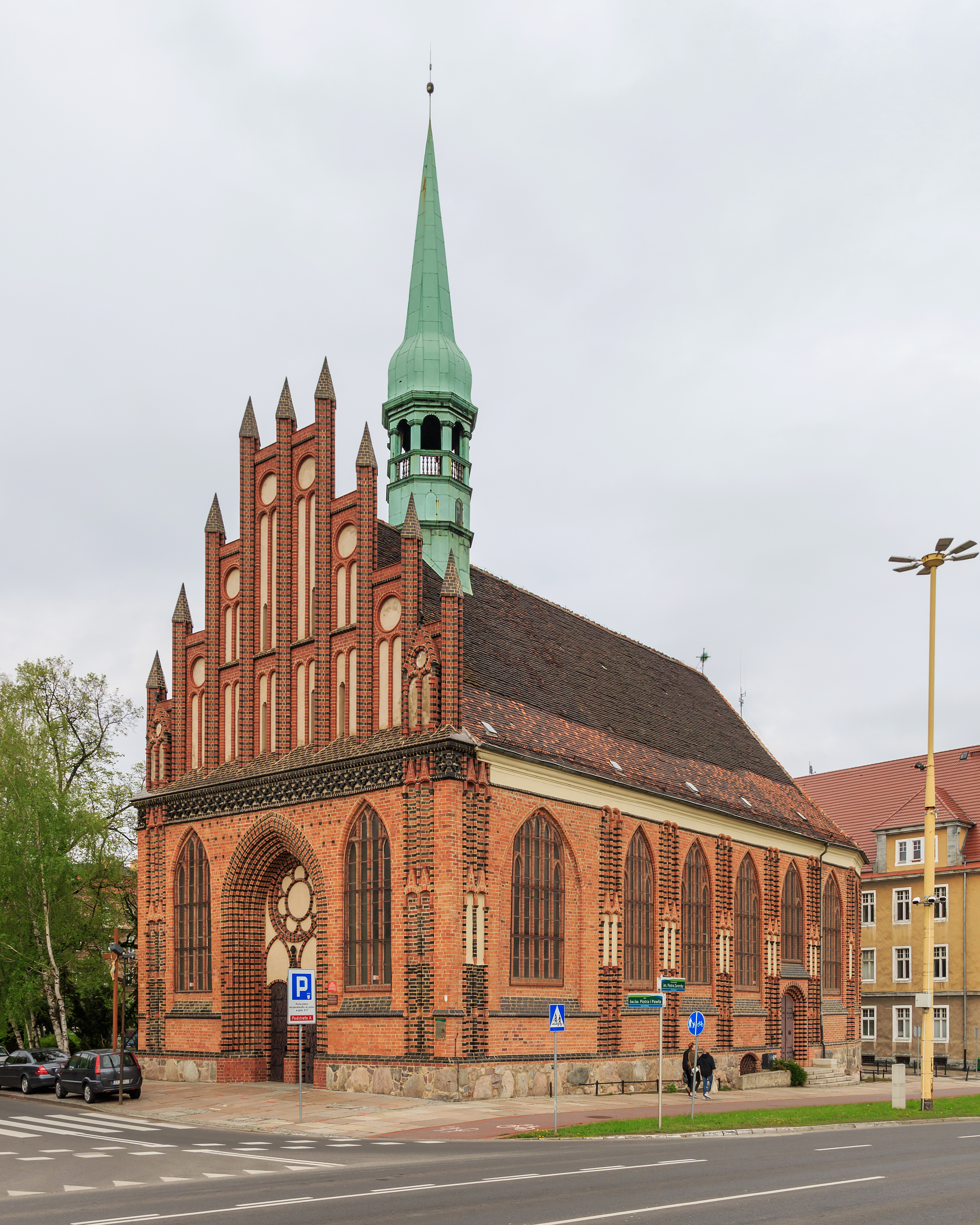
Church of Saints Peter and Paul in Szczecin

Hinrich Brunsberg, also Heinrich Brunsberg or Henryk Brunsberg, (1350 – between 1428 and 1435 presumably in Szczecin) was a German architect who shaped the medieval Brick Gothic style in eastern northern Germany. He worked around 1400, especially in the Margraviate of Brandenburg and in the Duchy of Pomerania.

== Life ==
Brunsberg was born around 1350 in State of the Teutonic Order. It is assumed that he came from the town of Braniewo. In 1372, he acquired citizenship in Gdańsk, where there is evidence of land ownership in his name in 1378. Around 1400, he was mentioned for the first time in the liber qurelarum of the city of Szczecin. With the year 1401, an inscription on the north chapel of St. Catherine's Church in the Neustadt Brandenburg names him as the master builder of the church building. The last mention in the ecclesiastical abandonment books of Szczecin dates from 1428. Presumably he died there soon afterwards, but at the latest in 1435 after the completion of the Marienkapelle at St. Catherine's Church in Brandenburg.

== Buildings ==
- St.-Katharinen-Kirche Brandenburg an der Havel
- Cathedral Basilica of St. James the Apostle, Szczecin
- Umbau of the Szczecin Town Hall (destroyed by the effects of war as early as 1677)
- St. Mary's Church, Stargard
- St. Mary's Church in Chojna
- City hall in Chojna
- Church of the Blessed Virgin Mary in Poznań
- St. Stephan (Gartz)
- Rathaus Tangermünde
