= St. Mary's Church, Chojna =

Church in Chojna, Poland

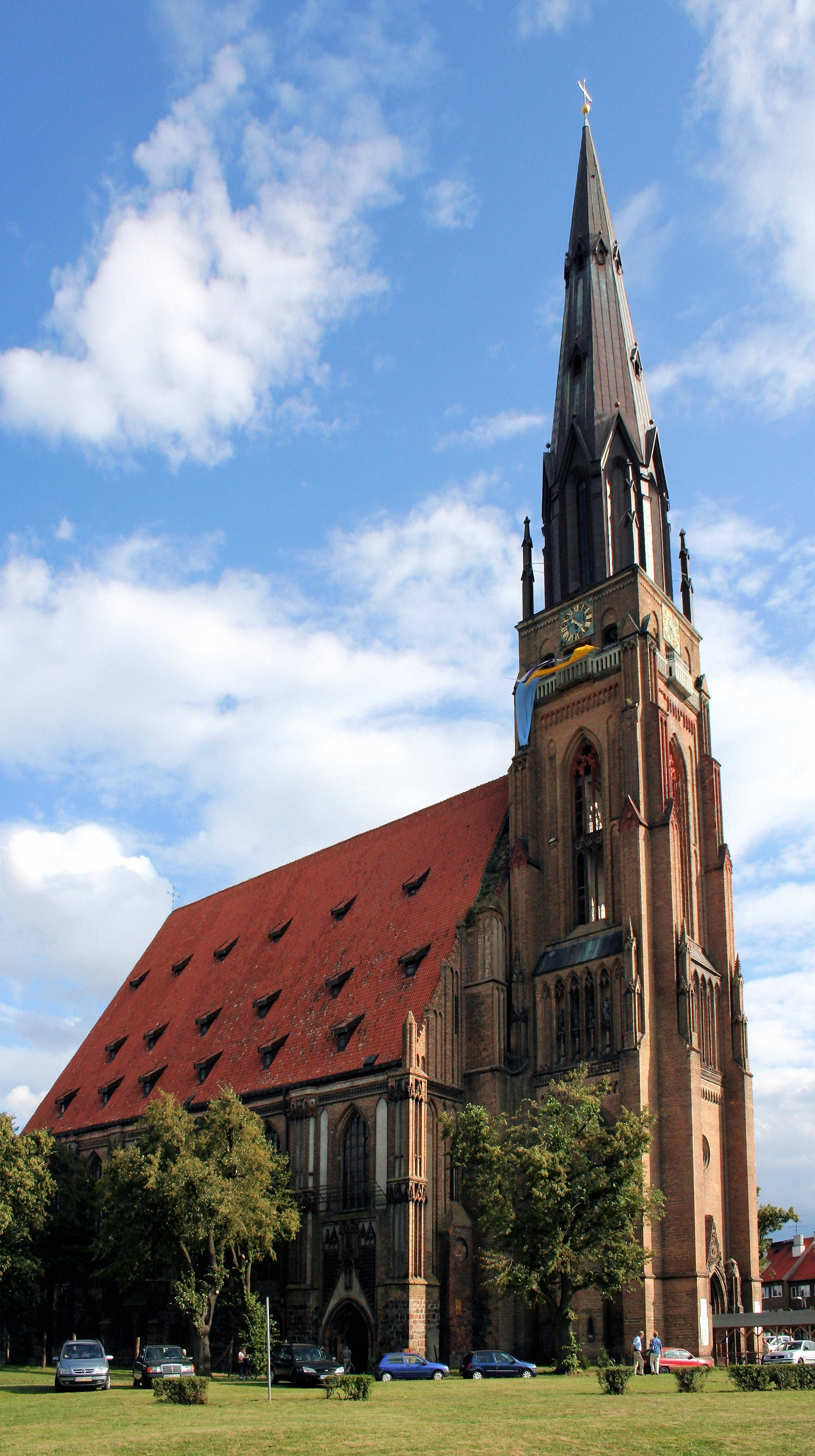

St. Mary's Church is a monumental building located in Chojna, one of the largest Gothic churches in Poland. Three-nave, hall, erected in the years 1389–1407 from granite blocks, expanded in the 15th century by Henry Brunsberg . From the outside decorated with glazed brick. The 102.6 meter high neo-gothic tower from 1859 to 1861 dominates the area.

== History ==
The oldest temple on the site of the existing Gothic church, was built right after the city was founded in the second half of the 13th century. There is no direct record of its form, although some argue for a three-nave basilica with a prominent transept and a rectangular chancel from the east, and a massive, rectangular tower from the west. The walls of this oldest church were built, it seems, of granite cubes, which seems to be indicated by the relics discovered during architectural and conservation research.

In the second half of the 14th century, the presbytery of the church from the 13th century was demolished and the construction of a brick presbytery and three eastern spans of the nave of the monumental Gothic church began. The consecration of the new part of the church took place in 1407.

The origin and history of the chapel adjoining the south side to both rectangular bays of the first stage of the construction of the Gothic church are not fully clear. It is known, however, that the gallery erected above it must have been built before 1440.

The date of commencement of the second stage of the construction of the Gothic church is also unknown . Before 1479, at the western gable wall, on the southern side, an external chapel of St. Anna.

Eventually, the church took the form of a six-bay, transeptless hall based on the massive church tower from the 13th century from the west, and closed from the east by a polygonal choir with an ambulatory. The structural core of the perimeter walls formed a system of buttresses pulled into the interior, between which chapels open to the interior were placed in the ground floor, and the bays of the circumferential gallery above. The aisles, chapels and galleries of the ambulatory were covered with a standard four-part cross-rib vault, while stellar vaults were used in the nave and the gallery of St. Mary's Chapel. The convergence of the characteristic forms of the structure with the buttresses pulled into the interior and the features of the plastic decoration of the façade articulated with decorative pilaster strips appearing in the buildings associated with the activities of Hinrich Brunsberg's workshop meant that the authorship of the parish church in Chojna was attributed to this legendary architect and master builder of the late medieval period.

The Gothic church survived almost intact until July 2, 1843, when a construction disaster occurred, during which the south-western corner of the medieval tower collapsed, destroying the chapel of St. Anna. The surviving elements of the structure were soon dismantled and never rebuilt. Only 16 years after the catastrophe, the construction of a new tower was started according to the design of Friedrich August Stüler, with the probable participation of Carl Dieckhoff and a certain Sulzer. This investment was carried out in the years 1855-1861 by erecting a tower of brick and, to a small extent, of stone - a neo-gothic tower with a height of about 100 meters.

Due to the deteriorating technical condition of the masonry shell of the soaring cupola, in 1932–1933 the neo-gothic tower was renovated, strengthened and rebuilt, leading to the deformation of its original, picturesque shape.

On February 16, 1945, as a result of a fire caused by arson, the roof truss, vaults and nine inter-nave pillars as well as the equipment of the nave body, as well as the dome crowning the tower and all ceilings inside it were destroyed . However, the perimeter walls with the vaults of the chapels and the gallery located between the buttresses in the nave and the ambulatory pulled into the interior, as well as the structure of the tower up to a height of approx. 80 m above the surrounding area, have been preserved. Since then, the church has remained in a state of open ruin.

In the post-war period, several attempts were made to prepare measurement, research and design documentation for the purpose of securing the ruins of the church.

The first project of securing the facility was prepared in 1952 by Eng. Witkiewicz from PKZ in Toruń. The scope of works to be performed included, above all, measures leading to temporary, technical protection, ruins, among others, by introducing reinforced concrete wreaths on the crown of the walls. However, the intention was not implemented. In 1956 the church was legally protected. Soon after this event, another attempt was made to secure the surviving walls and eliminate the threats posed by the ruin located in the city center. In 1960, at the Department of Polish Architecture of the Warsaw University of Technology, commissioned by the provincial conservator of monumentsin Szczecin, a project was developed to secure and open to the public a building in the form of a permanent ruin, designed by A. Gruszecki, J. Widawski and K. Kakowski. Prace budowlane wg powyższego projektu prowadzono w ruinie kościoła w ograniczonym zakresie w latach 1966–1970 Construction works according to the above project were carried out in the ruins of the church to a limited extent in the years 1966–1970. Among other things, reinforced concrete flat roofs were made at that time over the preserved vaults in St. Mary's Chapel and part of the bays of the gallery in the ambulatory. However, all the works provided for in the design documentation were never carried out, and the ruins were not open to the public.

Another attempt to secure the building was made only in the years 1985–1990, after almost 45 years of exposing the ruin to weather conditions. Despite the measures taken earlier to secure the technical condition of the brick structure, it remained generally bad at that time, and the building suffered numerous failureslocally.

== Reconstruction ==
Construction of the roof truss on St. Mary's Church in Chojna, designed by architect Maciej Płotkowiak (1995) As the measurement and research documentation prepared earlier was dispersed and destroyed, the measurements of the ruin were taken in the first place, which in the years 1990-1991 were carried out by students of the faculty of Architecture and Spatial Planning at the Faculty of Civil Engineering and Architecture of the Szczecin University of Technology under the supervision of employees of the Institute of Architecture and Spatial Planning of the Szczecin University of Technology : Stefan Kwilecki and Maciej Płotkowiak.

The preparation of measurement documentation enabled the project team, composed of mgr inż. arch. M. Płotkowiak, Eng. arch. S. Kwilecki and mgr inż. arch. J. Karwowski, drawing up in 1991 technical and economic assumptions for the reconstruction of the nave. The simplest and imposing method of separating the wall structure from the weather was adopted for the implementation, using a tent roof of the same shape as the roof existing until 1945. A serious difficulty in the process of developing the concept of securing the nave body was the lack of 9 out of 14 original inter-nave pillars.

Finally, in order to simplify the structure and reduce its costs, it was decided to replace the non-existent ones with modern construction technology - new inter-aisle supports of a neutral form, which would allow supporting the roof truss on them. Implementation of the investment, including the first stage of securing works, was carried out in the years 1994–1997.

The impulse to start the second stage of works, concerning the ruins of the neo-Gothic tower in accordance with the adopted strategy, was triggered by the forces of nature in 1997. For reasons unknown at the time, one of the steel clamps with which the brick spire of the tower was fastened during the securing works in the years 1932-1933 failed. This seemingly harmless failure, the cause of which could not be determined due to the lack of access to the part of the tower above the vault above the porch, raised concerns about the stability of the entire structure with a total height of 80.54 meters. The circumstance additionally intensifying emotions was the location of multi-family residential buildings and a provincial road at a distance not exceeding the height of the ruin of the tower, i.e. within the immediate danger zone in the event of a potential construction disaster. The design documentation necessary to carry out the renovation of the tower was prepared by mgr inż. arch.Maciej Płotkowiak with the band at the turn of 1997/1998. The construction and assembly works were divided into two stages:

- stage IIa: consisting in securing the endangered part of the tower with a structure in the form of an outer shell with a network structure in a reinforced concrete structure
- stage IIb: hiding the protective structure under the roofing layer of the helmet

The implementation of stage IIa was carried out in 1998–1999.

The basis for further works carried out in the years 2000–2008 was the design documentation prepared by mgr inż. arch Maciej Płotkowiak with his team. At the beginning, a reconstruction of the non-existent since 1945 crowning of the spire in the form of a pyramid with an octagonal base was designed and implemented. The core of the crowning element is designed as a steel structure. The tower gained a total height of 98 meters and a spectacular appearance with a pyramidal top covered with sheet metal.

In 2005, Płotkowiak undertook the development of documentation for the completion of stage IIb of works in the church tower. The scope of the task included changing the functional solutions inside the lower, cuboid part of the block, designating the clock storey for an observation deck and renovation of the facade.

Construction works were carried out in 2007–2009, but their scope was limited to the minimum necessary to enable safe use of the observation deck. Thus, until the end of stage IIb, there is still the maintenance of the lower façade, the cuboid part of the body and minor works inside the tower.

The concept of action in stage III of the works - i.e. inside the church - has not yet been developed, as the most urgent task was to replace the existing roofing (the monk-nun tile laid in the late 1990s turned out to be extremely unstable). Design documentation for this project was prepared in 2013 by Pracownia Projektowa PIN under the direction of Płotkowiak. Due to the scarcity of funds, the process of replacing the roofing, started in 2012, was completed only in 2020. The roofing work carried out prevented the opening of the observation deck on the church tower.

== In popular culture ==
One of the scenes of Lars von Trier's film Europa was shot in the St. Mary's Church in Chojna.
