= Strzeszewko =

- Village
- Location within Poland
- Coordinates: 52°59′55″N 14°34′15″E
- Country: Poland
- Voivodeship: West Pomeranian
- County: Gryfino
- Gmina: Chojna
- Population: 21

Strzeszewko [stʂɛˈʂɛfkɔ] is a village in the administrative district of Gmina Chojna, within Gryfino County, West Pomeranian Voivodeship, in north-western Poland, close to the German border.

For the history of the region, see History of Pomerania.

The village has a population of 21.
