= Godków, West Pomeranian Voivodeship =

Godków
- Village
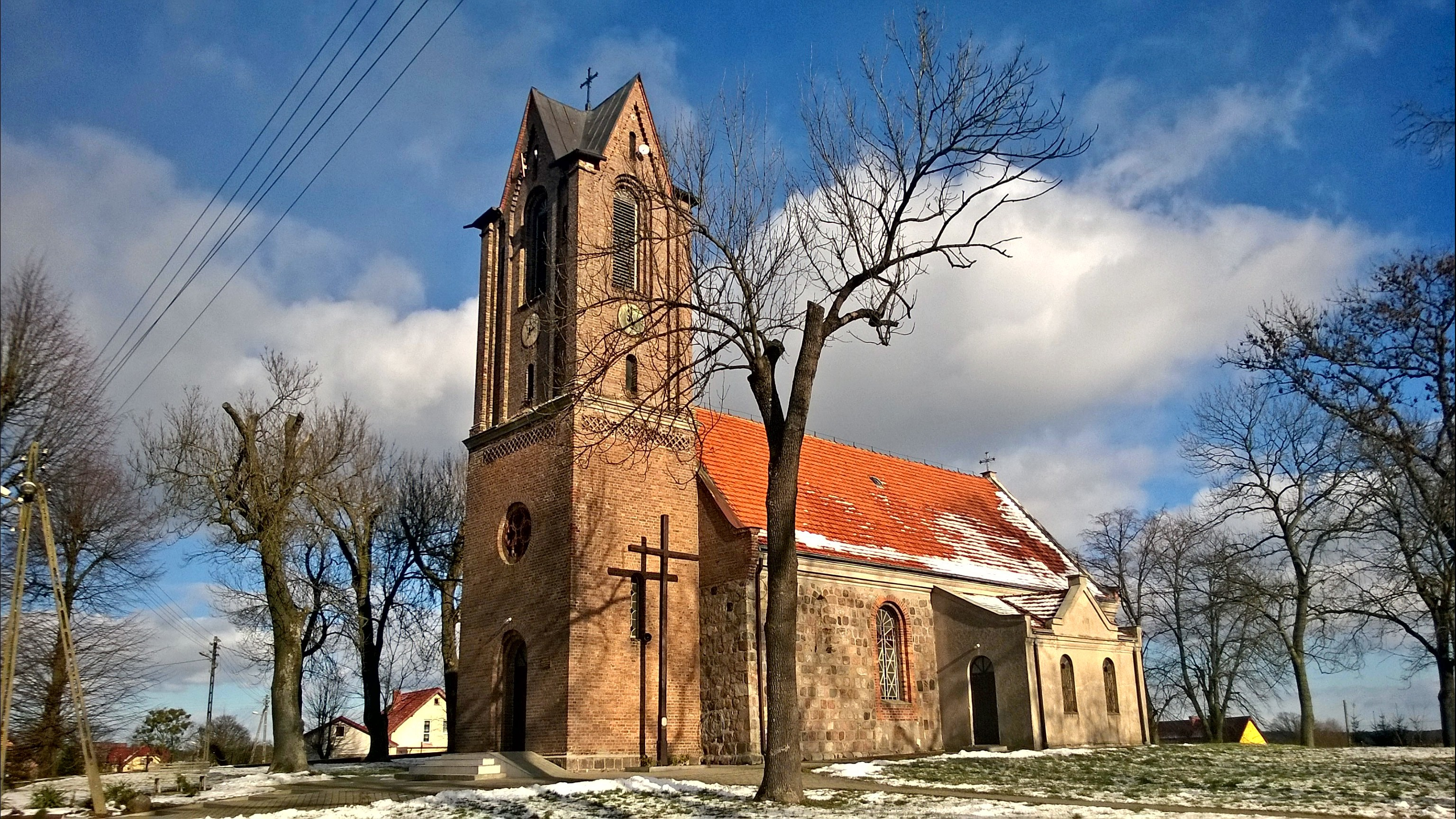
- Church of Saint Maximilian Kolbe

- Location within Poland
- Coordinates: 52°54′36″N 14°25′48″E
- Country: Poland
- Voivodeship: West Pomeranian
- County: Gryfino
- Gmina: Chojna

Godków [ˈɡɔtkuf] is a village in the administrative district of Gmina Chojna, within Gryfino County, West Pomeranian Voivodeship, in north-western Poland, close to the German border. It lies approximately 7 km (4 mi) south of Chojna, 38 km (24 mi) south of Gryfino, and 58 km (36 mi) south of the regional capital Szczecin.

For the history of the region, see History of Pomerania.
