= Czesław Hoc =

Polish politician (born 1954)

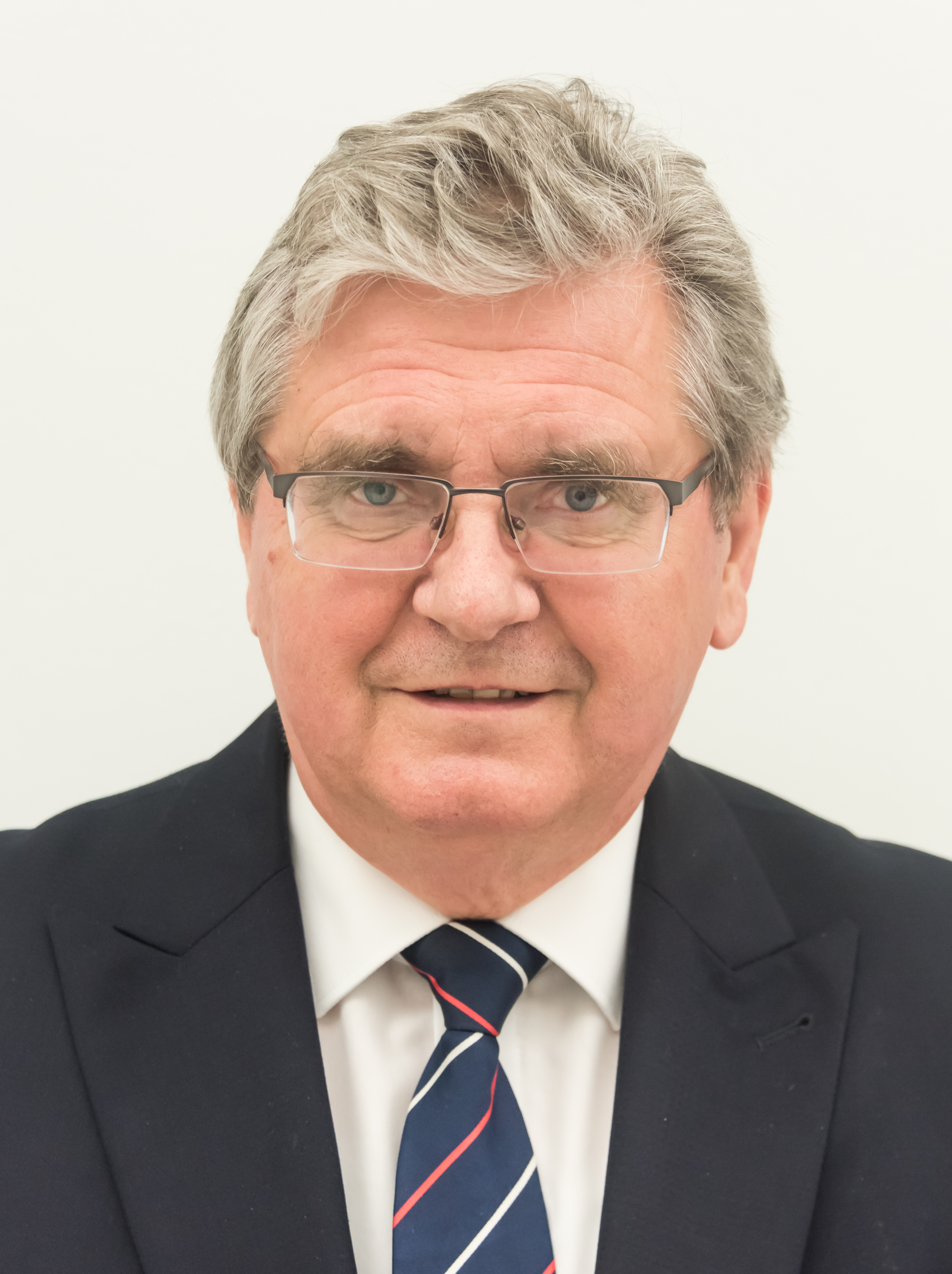

Member of the European Parliament
- Incumbent
- Assumed office 26 November 2015
- Preceded by: Marek Gróbarczyk
- Constituency: Lubusz and West Pomeranian

Member of the Sejm
- In office 25 September 2005 – 26 November 2015

Personal details
- Born: 22 February 1954 (age 72) Jelenin, Poland
- Party: Law and Justice
- Education: Pomeranian Medical University (M.D.)
- Profession: Politician, doctor

Czesław Hoc (born 22 February 1954) is a Polish politician. He was elected to the Sejm on 25 September 2005, getting 10,746 votes in the 40-Koszalin district, as a candidate of the Law and Justice. Prior to his entry into politics, Hoc was a doctor at the Kołobrzeg Medical Center, receiving his doctorate of medicine from the Pomeranian Medical University in 1979.

During a local referendum, MP Hoc supported the antinuclear movement in Mielno and Gąski where 94% of inhabitants voted against Polish government's NPP location.

He became a Member of the European Parliament (MEP) in November 2015, replacing Marek Gróbarczyk.

== See also ==
- Members of Polish Sejm 2005–07
