= Przyciesie =

- Settlement
- Location within Poland
- Coordinates: 53°00′14″N 14°26′58″E
- Country: Poland
- Voivodeship: West Pomeranian
- County: Gryfino
- Gmina: Chojna
- Population: 5

Przyciesie [pʂɨˈt͡ɕɛɕɛ] is a settlement in the administrative district of Gmina Chojna, within Gryfino County, West Pomeranian Voivodeship, in north-western Poland, near the German border.

For the history of the region, see History of Pomerania.

The settlement has a population of 5.
