= Kuropatniki =

- Settlement
- Location within Poland
- Coordinates: 52°58′21″N 14°17′52″E
- Country: Poland
- Voivodeship: West Pomeranian
- County: Gryfino
- Gmina: Chojna
- Population: 5

Kuropatniki [kurɔpatˈniki] is a settlement in the administrative district of Gmina Chojna, within Gryfino County, West Pomeranian Voivodeship, in north-western Poland, close to the German border.

For the history of the region, see History of Pomerania.

The settlement has a population of 3 individuals.
