= Karkkila =

Town in Uusimaa, Finland

Karkkila Högfors
- Town
- Karkkilan kaupunki Högfors stad
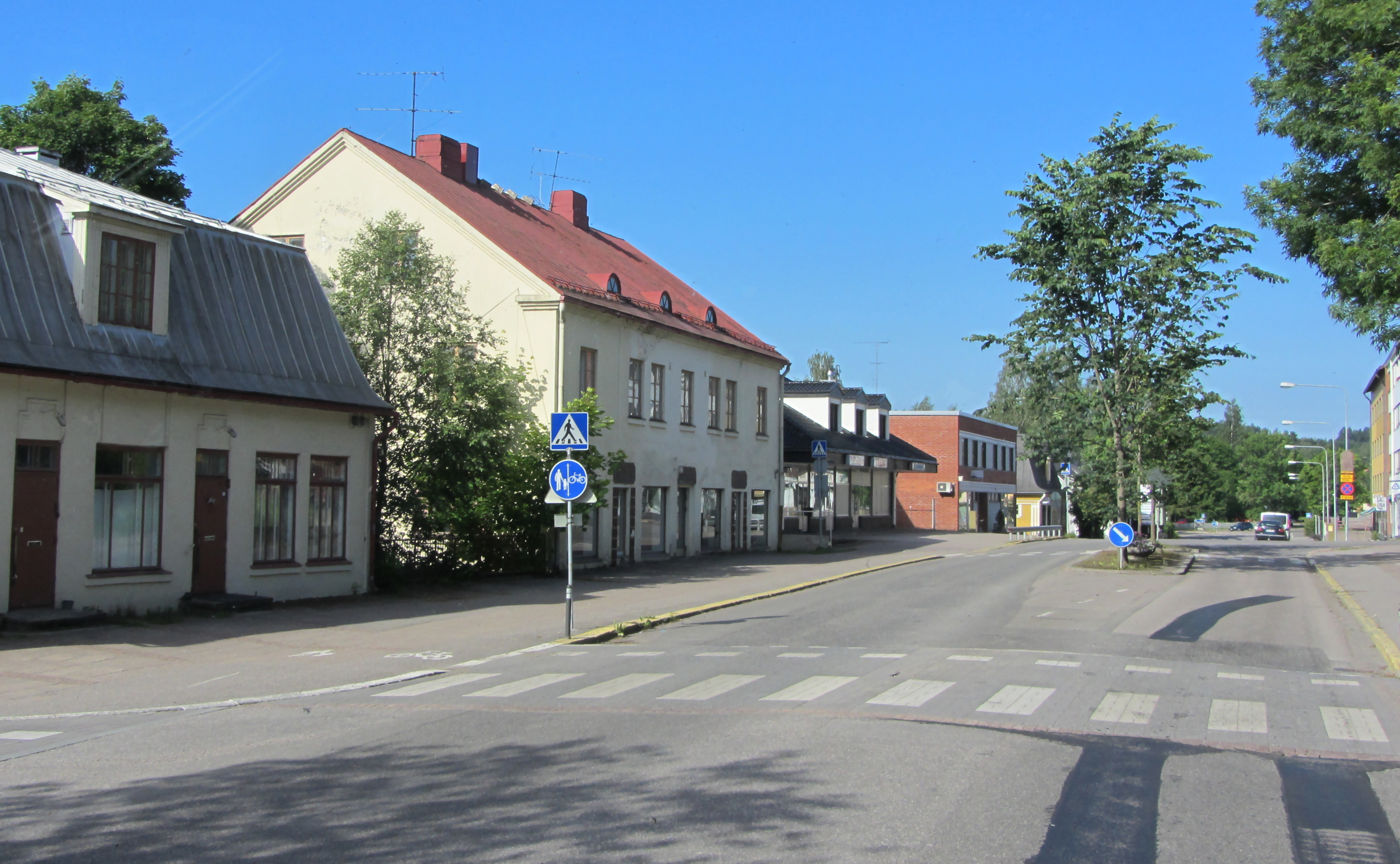
- Road Helsingintie in town centre

- Coat of arms

- Location of Karkkila in Finland
- Interactive map of Karkkila
- Coordinates: 60°32′N 024°13′E
- Country: Finland
- Region: Uusimaa
- Sub-region: Helsinki sub-region (formerly Lohja sub-region)
- Charter: 1932
- Town: 1977

Government
  - Mayor: Tuija Telén

Area (2018-01-01)
  - Total: 255.32 km^{2} (98.58 sq mi)
  - Land: 242.44 km^{2} (93.61 sq mi)
  - Water: 12.95 km^{2} (5.00 sq mi)
  - Rank: 248th largest in Finland

Population (2025-12-31)
  - Total: 8,274
  - Rank: 115th largest in Finland
  - Density: 34.13/km^{2} (88.4/sq mi)

Population by native language
  - Finnish: 90.7% (official)
  - Swedish: 0.7%
  - Others: 8.6%

Population by age
  - 0 to 14: 14.9%
  - 15 to 64: 58.3%
  - 65 or older: 26.7%
- Time zone: UTC+02:00 (EET)
  - Summer (DST): UTC+03:00 (EEST)
- Climate: Dfb
- Website: www.karkkila.fi

Karkkila (Finnish pronunciation: [ˈkɑrkːilɑ]; Swedish: Högfors) is a town and a municipality of Finland. Neighboring municipalities are Lohja, Loppi, Tammela and Vihti.

Karkkila is an old working-class town with a focus on the metal industry, a fact reflected in the hammers and the rayonné line featured on town's coat of arms. The coat of arms was designed by Olof Eriksson and officially adopted on September 21, 1956.

== Geography ==
Karkkila is located in the Uusimaa region. The municipality has a population of 8,274 (31 December 2025) and it covers an area of 255.32 square kilometres (98.58 sq mi) of which 12.95 square kilometres (5.00 sq mi) is inland water (2018-01-01). The population density is 34 inhabitants per square kilometre (88/sq mi) (31 December 2025).

The municipality is unilingually Finnish.

== History ==
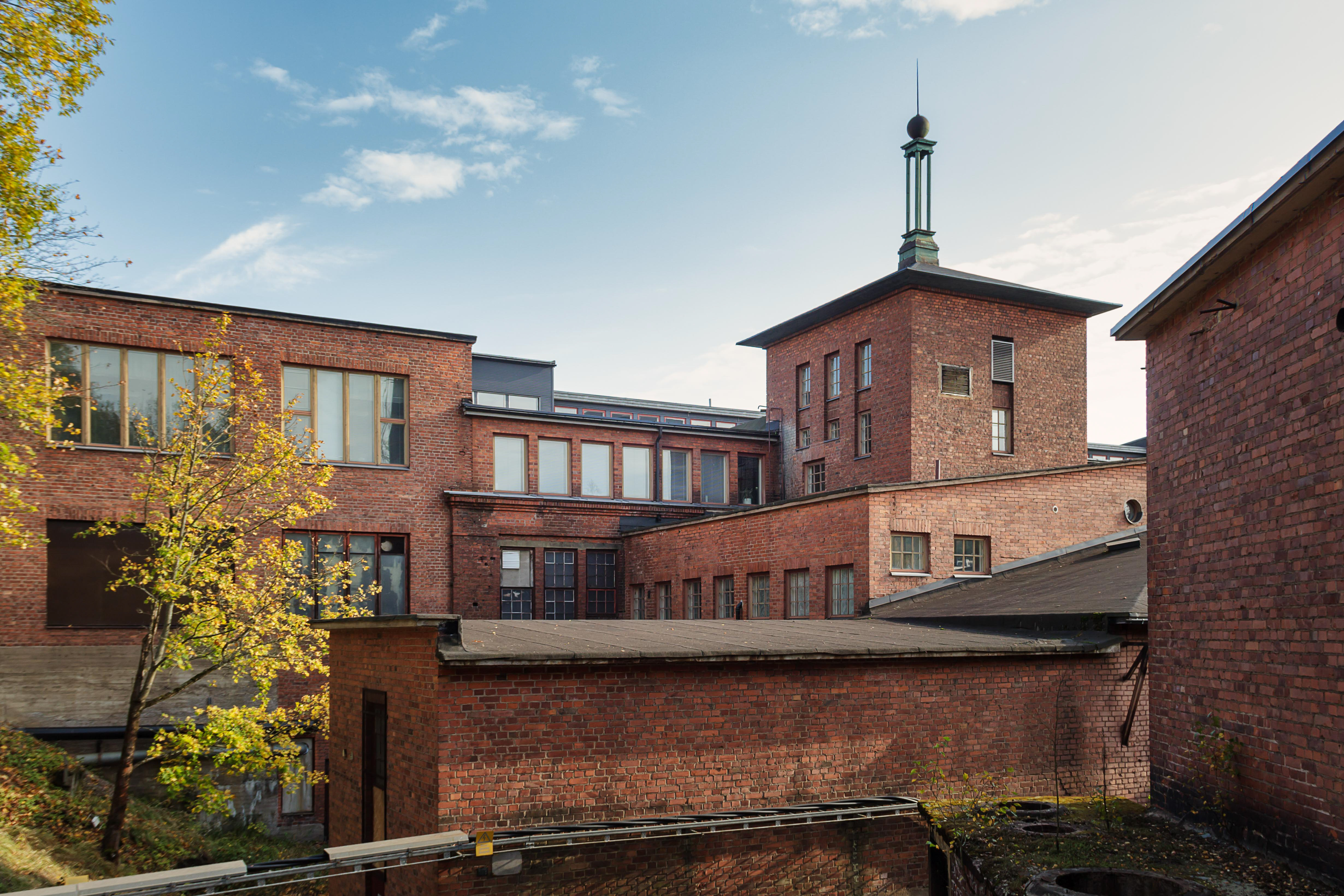
The Högfors Ironworks (Högforsin ruukki) from the 1820s in Karkkila

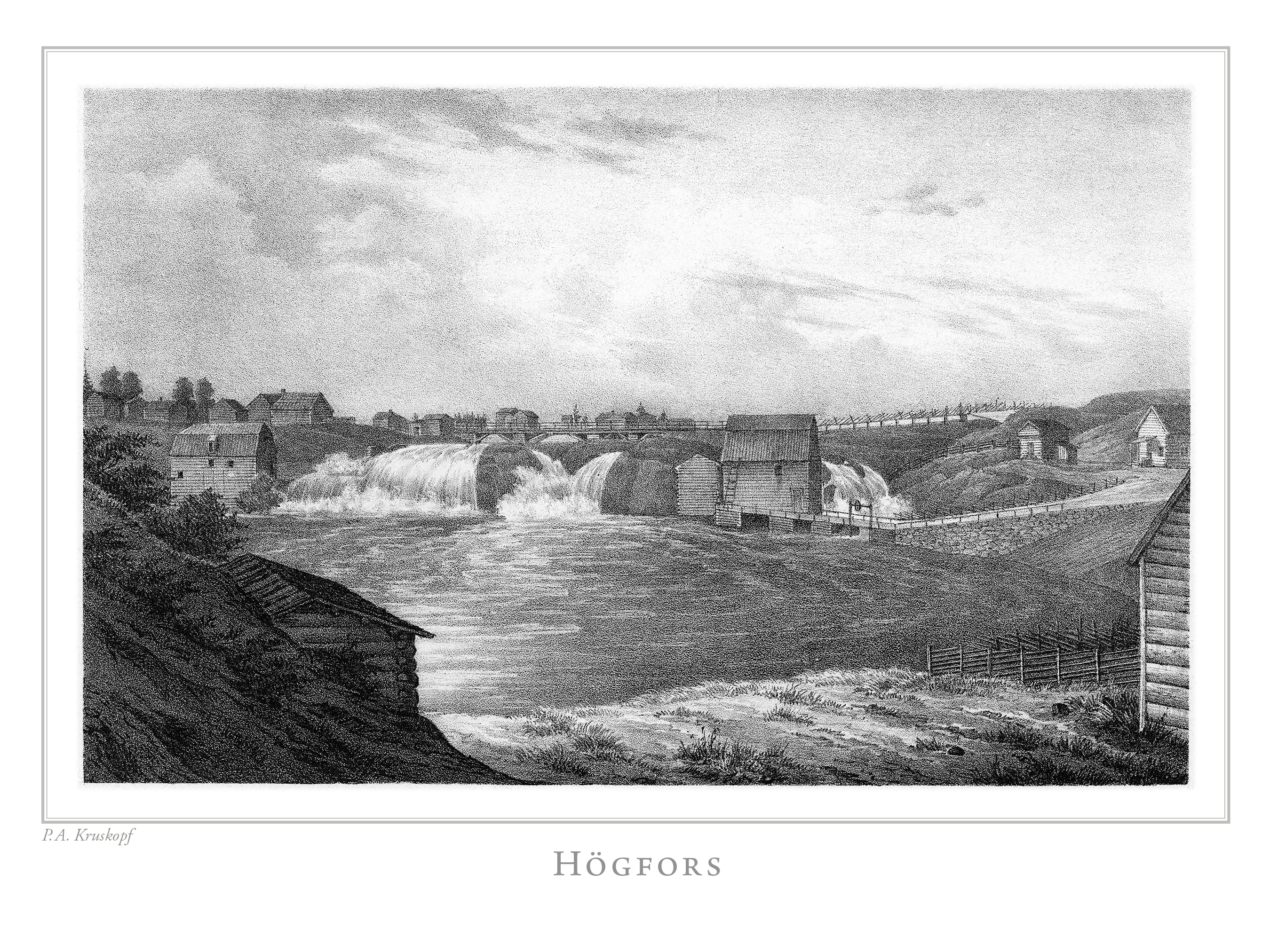
Illustration of the bruk in Finland framstäldt i teckningar edited by Zacharias Topelius and published 1845-1852.

Originally, Karkkila was a village in the municipality of Pyhäjärvi. In the 14th century, the Pyhäjärvi area belonged to the border area of the parishes of Janakkala and Lohja. In 1507, the Pyhäjärvi area became part of the Vihti parish, which was separated from the Lohja parish. Pyhäjärvi became the chapel congregation of the Vihti parish in 1654. The place was originally known as Pahajärvi ("bad lake"), but the name became established as Pyhäjärvi ("holy lake") in the late 17th or 18th century. It was decided to form Pyhäjärvi as an independent parish by a decision of the Imperial Senate in 1861, but the separation did not happen until 1869. Based on the municipal decree of 1865, Pyhäjärvi began its activities as a municipality in 1868.

The borough of Karkkila was formed from the center of Pyhäjärvi by separating it from Pyhäjärvi in 1932. The borough area consisted mainly of the villages of Nyhkälä and Karkkila. The growth and industrialization of Karkkila has been affected by the now closed narrow-gauge Hyvinkää–Karkkila railway. Later, the municipality of Pyhäjärvi was merged with the Karkkila borough in 1969. Until now, the municipality and the borough had belonged to the Pyhäjärvi parish, whose name was changed to the Karkkila parish in connection with the municipal association. Officially, the Karkkila borough became a town in 1977.

== Culture ==
- Kark'kisällit, quartet based in Karkkila
- Sulattofestival, an art and music festival

== Politics ==
Karkkila is famous for having a strong support of red parties. Up to the municipal elections in 2012, the Left Alliance had always been the most voted party in Karkkila. In the 2022 county election of Finland, the Left Alliance rose to the top again making Karkkila the only municipality in Finland where the majority of votes where given to the Left.

Results of the 2019 parliamentary election of Finland in Karkkila:

- Social Democratic Party 25.8%
- The Finns Party 19.7%
- Left Alliance 13.4%
- National Coalition Party 11.1%
- Green League 9.2%
- Centre Party 9.1%
- Movement Now 4.0%
- Christian Democrats 2.4%
- Blue Reform 1.3%
- Swedish People's Party 1.1%

The results of the municipal elections in Karkkila in 2021:

- Joint list of Karkkilaan Sitoutuneet 29%
- Social Democratic Party 16.4%
- National Coalition Party 16%
- Left Alliance 14.2%
- The Finns Party 9%
- Centre Party 7.1%
- The Greens 1%
- Christian Democrats 1%
- Communist Party of Finland 0.4%

== Personalities ==
- Movie director Aki Kaurismäki lives in Karkkila.
- Famous Finnish curler Markku Uusipaavalniemi comes from Karkkila.
- Sampsa Astala, better known as Kita from the hard rock band Lordi, spent most of his teenage years living in Karkkila.

== International relations ==
=== Twin towns - Sister cities ===
Karkkila was a member of the Douzelage, a unique town twinning association of 24 towns across the European Union. This active town twinning began in 1991 and there are regular events, such as a produce market from each of the other countries and festivals. Karkkila was replaced by Asikkala as the Finnish town in the association in 2016.

Altea, Spain - 1991
Bad Kötzting, Germany - 1991
Bellagio, Italy - 1991
(Republic of Ireland) Bundoran, Ireland - 1991
Granville, France - 1991
Holstebro, Denmark - 1991
Houffalize, Belgium - 1991
Meerssen, the Netherlands - 1991
Niederanven, Luxembourg - 1991
Preveza, Greece - 1991
Sesimbra, Portugal - 1991
Sherborne, United Kingdom - 1991
Karkkila, Finland - 1997–2016
Oxelösund, Sweden - 1998
Judenburg, Austria - 1999
Chojna, Poland - 2004
Kőszeg, Hungary - 2004
Sigulda, Latvia - 2004
Sušice, Czech Republic - 2004
Türi, Estonia - 2004
Zvolen, Slovakia - 2007
Rokiškis, Lithuania - 2018
Marsaskala, Malta - 2009
Siret, Romania - 2010
