= Chojna Air Base =

- IATA: none; ICAO: none

Summary
- Operator: formerly Luftwaffe; Soviet Air Force
- Location: Chojna, Poland
- Built: 1938
- In use: 1938-1992
- Elevation AMSL: 57 m (187 ft)
- Coordinates: 52.9396°N 14.4191°E

Map
- Location of airport in West Pomeranian Voivodeship Chojna Air Base (Poland)

Runways
Direction	Length		Surface
Direction	ft	m	Surface
09/27		2,300	concrete
- Disused

Chojna Air Base is a former military air base near the town of Chojna in West Pomeranian Voivodeship, Poland. The airfield was built as Königsberg-Neumark Air Base for the Luftwaffe in the then province of Pomerania.

== History ==
=== 1937–1945 ===
The base was built between 1937 and 1938 for the Luftwaffe. The runway had a grass surface. In the north of the air base there were two very large and three large aircraft hangars and a large repair hangar. Behind the hangars were other farm and accommodation buildings. The first flying unit stationed here, from August 1939, was II./Kampfgeschwader 27. From 1939 to 1945, various pilot schools were also housed here.

=== 1945–1992 ===
On 4 February 1945, Red Army troops occupied the base.

The base was used by the following Soviet Air Force units:

- 149th Fighter Regiment operating Yak-9s (January 1946 to February 1949)
- 871st Fighter Regiment operating Yak-9s (February 1949 to December 1952)
- 582nd Fighter Regiment operating MiG-17, MiG-21F-13, MiG-21PF, MiG-21PFM, MiG-21SMT, MiG-21bis and Su-27 (June 1955 to 5 May 1992)
- 330th independent Reconnaissance Regiment operating MiG-15Rbis (1956–1963)

On 5 May 1992 the 582nd Fighter Regiment withdrew to Smolensk.
