= Mętno Małe =

- Village
- Location within Poland
- Coordinates: 52°55′09″N 14°21′44″E
- Country: Poland
- Voivodeship: West Pomeranian
- County: Gryfino
- Gmina: Chojna
- Population: 85

Mętno Małe [ˈmɛntnɔ ˈmawɛ] is a village in the administrative district of Gmina Chojna, within Gryfino County, West Pomeranian Voivodeship, in north-western Poland, close to the German border.

For the history of the region, see History of Pomerania.

The village has a population of 85.
