= Lisie Pola =

- Village
- Location within Poland
- Coordinates: 53°01′49″N 14°26′34″E
- Country: Poland
- Voivodeship: West Pomeranian
- County: Gryfino
- Gmina: Chojna
- Population: 50

Lisie Pola [ˈliɕɛ ˈpɔla] is a village in the administrative district of Gmina Chojna, within Gryfino County, West Pomeranian Voivodeship, in north-western Poland, close to the German border.

For the history of the region, see History of Pomerania.

The village has a population of 50.
