= Kark'kisällit =

Finnish quartet

- Also known as: Gruppo Voces ry.
- Origin: Karkkila, Uusimaa region, Finland
- Years active: 1990-2016
- Members: Matti Kuusela, Timo Saario, Urpo Nikander, Tauno Lagerkrants

Kark'kisällit (sometimes also Karkkisällit/Gruppo Voces ry.) was a Finnish quartet based in the town of Karkkila in Uusimaa region. The quartet started singing together in 1990 and ended the career in November 2016 with a farewell concert called "En kadu mitään" (I don't regret anything).

== Career ==
The quartet Kark'kisällit consisted of old friends Matti Kuusela, Timo Saario, Urpo Niklander and Tauno Lagerkrantz. Kark'kisällit was active for over 24 years having Karkkila as their hometown though also performing all around Finland.

=== Concerts ===
Kark'kisällit organised annual concerts in Karkkila Hall (Karkkila-sali) which soon became widely popular, attracting people to come and listen to them from neighbouring towns and all over Uusimaa region. The concerts were often sold out. The quartet chose a new repertoire and theme for each concert but despite that they had some songs that became traditions among them and their fans. Examples of these songs are Hirvenmetsästyslaulu (Elk hunting song) and Mississippi (Ol' Man River) which was sung by actor Esa Saario, a usual visiting star to Kark'kisällit's concerts. Another tradition was to hand out stipendiums to local people who were interested in vocal music. The stipendiums were handed out using the official name of the quartet, Gruppo Voces ry.

=== Members ===
- Matti Kuusela - the 2nd tenor
- Timo Saario - the 2nd bass voice + piano
- Urpo Nikander - the 1st bass voice
- Tauno Lagerkrantz - the 1st tenor + guitar

=== Repertoire ===
Kark'kisällit's repertoire was typically light, warm and beautiful. It consisted of music from Finland and abroad but the singing language was Finnish. One of the quartet's favourite artists was Reino Helismaa, whose music was often heard whenever Kark'kisällit was performing. Musical arrangements for the quartet was made by Timo Saario, Kark'kisällit's chief of music.
