= Douzelage =

Town twinning association

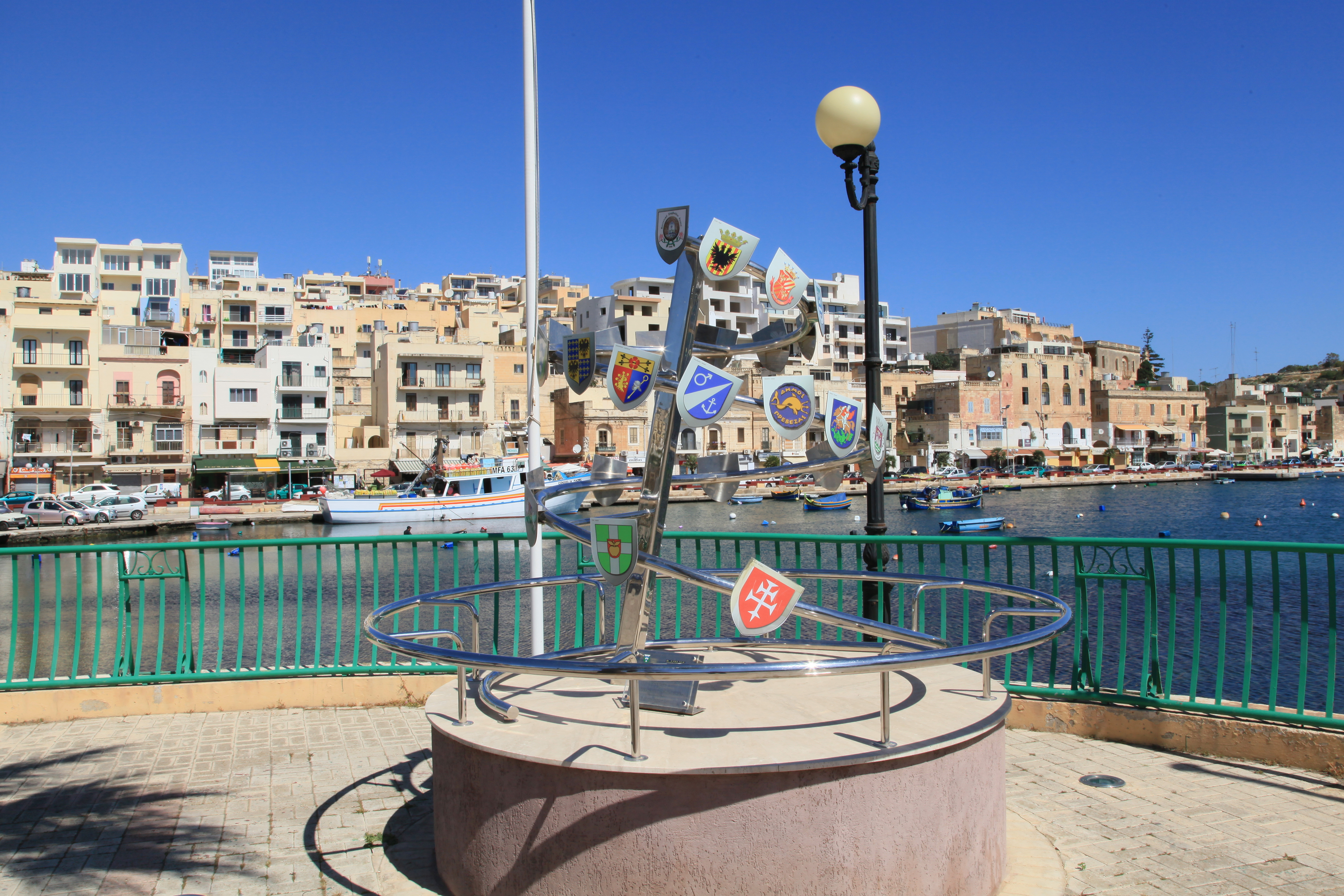
Monument commemorating the 20th anniversary of the Douzelage on 3 September 2011 in Marsaskala, Malta

Douzelage (French pronunciation: [duzlaʒ]) is a town twinning association with one town from each of the member states of the European Union and the United Kingdom.

== Name ==
The name is a portmanteau of the French words "douze" for twelve and "jumelage" for twinning and stands for the twelve founder members, one for each European Union member state in 1991, when the Douzelage Charter was signed in Granville, France. Although the membership of the EU, and of the association, has grown, the name Douzelage has been kept unchanged.

== Aims and organisation ==
The aims of the Douzelage are to promote and foster the spirit of Europe and to establish among others educational, economic, tourist, sporting and cultural links between the towns for the mutual benefit of the inhabitants thereof. Douzelage is chaired by a president and two vice-presidents, all elected for a period of three years. The official language used is English, partially also French.

The Douzelage movement received European recognition in 1993 when it was honoured by the European Commission with the "Golden Stars of Twinning".

Following Brexit in 2020, the English town of Sherborne is no longer situated in an EU-member state. However, a 2018 Douzelage document states that the town "must not have any consequences related to the Brexit and continue as a member of Douzelage European Town Twinning", and as such has remained a member.

=== Douzelage Youth ===
Douzelage Youth is a program that brings together young people from Douzelage member cities with a similar purpose to the main Douzelage organization.

== Members ==
Locations of current and former members of the Douzelage

Founder member (1991)
Current member (joined 1997–2018)

Former member

The original 12 founding members were:

- Altea, Spain
- Bad Kötzting, Germany
- Bellagio, Italy
- (Republic of Ireland) Bundoran, Ireland
- Granville, France
- Holstebro, Denmark
- Houffalize, Belgium
- Meerssen, Netherlands
- Niederanven, Luxembourg
- Preveza, Greece
- Sesimbra, Portugal
- Sherborne, England, United Kingdom

Towns that joined later are:

- Karkkila, Finland (1997–2016)
- Oxelösund, Sweden (1998)
- Judenburg, Austria (1999)

In a first step of further expansion, five new towns joined the Douzelage in harmony with the European enlargement process:

- Chojna, Poland (2004)
- Kőszeg, Hungary (2004)
- Sigulda, Latvia (2004)
- Sušice, Czech Republic (2004)
- Türi, Estonia (2004)

Since 2007, eight further towns have joined the organisation:

- Zvolen, Slovakia (2007)
- Prienai, Lithuania (2008–2018)
- Marsaskala, Malta (2009)
- Siret, Romania (2010)
- Agros, Cyprus (2011)
- Škofja Loka, Slovenia (2011)
- Tryavna, Bulgaria (2011)
- Rovinj, Croatia (2016)

In 2016, Finland changed its member:

- Asikkala, Finland (2016)

In 2018, Lithuania changed its member:

- Rokiškis, Lithuania (2018)
