= Kaliska, Gryfino County =

Kaliska
- Settlement
- Location within Poland
- Coordinates: 52°55′49″N 14°26′02″E
- Country: Poland
- Voivodeship: West Pomeranian
- County: Gryfino
- Gmina: Chojna
- Population: 15
- Time zone: UTC+1 (CET)
  - Summer (DST): UTC+2 (CEST)
- Vehicle registration: ZGR

Kaliska [kaˈliska] is a settlement in the administrative district of Gmina Chojna, within Gryfino County, West Pomeranian Voivodeship, in north-western Poland, close to the German border.

The settlement has a population of 15.
