= Jelonki, Gryfino County =

Jelonki
- Settlement
- Location within Poland
- Coordinates: 52°55′47″N 14°29′45″E
- Country: Poland
- Voivodeship: West Pomeranian
- County: Gryfino
- Gmina: Chojna
- Population: 4

Jelonki [jɛˈlɔnki] is a settlement in the administrative district of Gmina Chojna, within Gryfino County, West Pomeranian Voivodeship, in north-western Poland, close to the German border.

For the history of the region, see History of Pomerania.

The settlement has a population of 4.
