= Ognica, Gmina Chojna =

Ognica
- Village
- Location within Poland
- Coordinates: 53°03′25″N 14°21′13″E
- Country: Poland
- Voivodeship: West Pomeranian
- County: Gryfino
- Gmina: Chojna
- Population: 23

Ognica [ɔɡˈnit͡sa] is a village in the administrative district of Gmina Chojna, within Gryfino County, West Pomeranian Voivodeship, in north-western Poland, close to the German border.

For the history of the region, see History of Pomerania.

The village has a population of 23.
