= Wilcze, Gmina Chojna =

Wilcze
- Settlement
- Location within Poland
- Coordinates: 52°54′00″N 14°30′32″E
- Country: Poland
- Voivodeship: West Pomeranian
- County: Gryfino
- Gmina: Chojna
- Population: 6

Wilcze [ˈvilt͡ʂɛ] is a settlement in the administrative district of Gmina Chojna, within Gryfino County, West Pomeranian Voivodeship, in north-western Poland, close to the German border.

For the history of the region, see History of Pomerania.

The settlement has a population of 6.
