= Barnkowo =

- Village
- Location within Poland
- Coordinates: 52°57′42.13″N 14°27′14.16″E
- Country: Poland
- Voivodeship: West Pomeranian
- County: Gryfino
- Gmina: Chojna
- Population (2023): 24

Barnkowo [barnˈkɔvɔ] (German: Bernickow) is a village in the administrative district of Gmina Chojna, within Gryfino County, West Pomeranian Voivodeship, in north-western Poland, close to the German border.

== Demographics ==
Historical population
Year	Pop.	±%
2009	28	—
2023	24	−14.3%
Data may be affected by territorial fluctuation. Sources: 2023

== Notable residents ==
- Werner Gust (1910–1979), Wehrmacht officer
