= Gmina Chojna =

Gmina Chojna Chojna Commune
- Gmina
- Flag Coat of arms

- Location within Poland
- Coordinates (Chojna): 52°58′N 14°25′E
- Country: Poland
- Voivodeship: West Pomeranian
- County: Gryfino
- Seat: Chojna

Area
  - Total: 332.89 km^{2} (128.53 sq mi)

Population (2006)
  - Total: 13,960
  - Density: 41.94/km^{2} (108.6/sq mi)
  - Urban: 7,187
  - Rural: 6,773
- Website: http://www.chojna.pl/

Gmina Chojna is an urban-rural gmina (administrative district) in Gryfino County, West Pomeranian Voivodeship, in north-western Poland, on the German border.

== Geography ==
Its seat is the town of Chojna, which lies approximately 32 kilometres (20 mi) south of Gryfino and 52 km (32 mi) south of the regional capital Szczecin.

The gmina covers an area of 332.89 square kilometres (128.5 sq mi), and as of 2006 its total population is 13,960 (out of which the population of Chojna amounts to 7,187, and the population of the rural part of the gmina is 6,773).

The gmina contains part of the protected area called Cedynia Landscape Park.

== Villages ==
Apart from the town of Chojna, Gmina Chojna contains the villages and settlements of Bara, Barnkowo, Białęgi, Boguszczyn, Brwice, Czartoryja, Drozdowo, Garnowo, Godków, Godków-Osiedle, Grabowo, Graniczna, Grzybno, Jelenin, Jelonki, Kaliska, Kamienny Jaz, Krajnik Dolny, Krajnik Górny, Krupin, Krzymów, Kuropatniki, Łaziszcze, Lisie Pola, Lisie Pole, Mętno, Mętno Małe, Narost, Nawodna, Ognica, Ostrów, Pniewko, Przyciesie, Raduń, Rurka, Stoki, Strzelczyn, Strzeszewko, Trzeszcze, Wilcze, Wilkoszyce and Zatoń Dolna.

== Neighbouring gminas ==
Gmina Chojna is bordered by the gminas of Banie, Cedynia, Mieszkowice, Moryń, Trzcińsko-Zdrój and Widuchowa. It also borders Germany.
