= Chojna =

Town in West Pomeranian Voivodeship, Poland

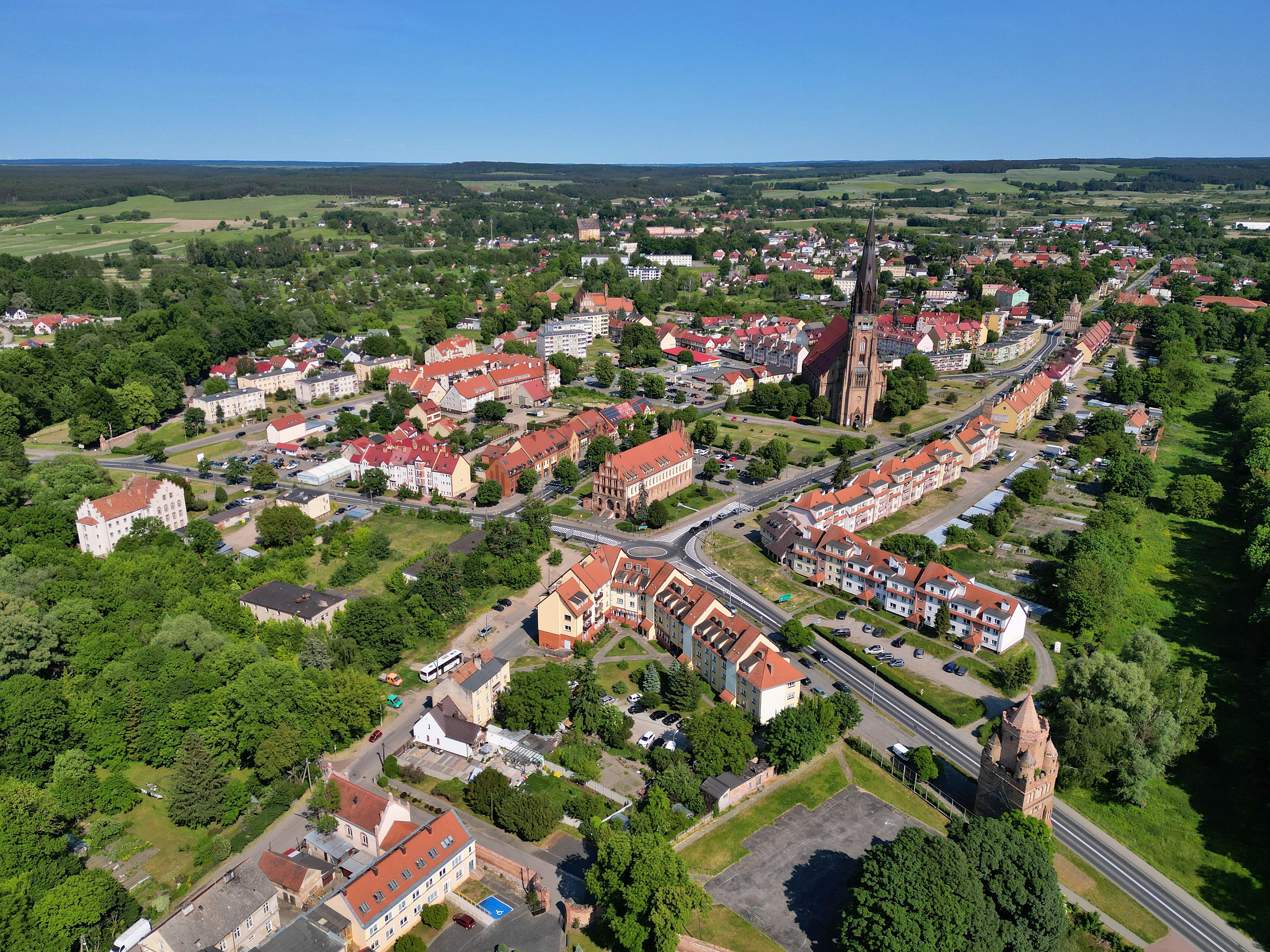
- Aerial view of the town with St. Mary's Church in the background

- Flag Coat of arms

- Location within Poland
- Coordinates: 52°58′N 14°25′E
- Country: Poland
- Voivodeship: West Pomeranian
- County: Gryfino
- Gmina: Chojna
- Town rights: 1255

Government
  - Mayor: Barbara Rawecka

Area
  - Total: 12.12 km^{2} (4.68 sq mi)

Population (31 December 2021)
  - Total: 7,330
  - Density: 605/km^{2} (1,570/sq mi)
- Time zone: UTC+1 (CET)
  - Summer (DST): UTC+2 (CEST)
- Postal code: 74-500
- Area code: +48 91
- Car plates: ZGR
- Website: http://www.chojna.pl

Chojna (Polish pronunciation: [ˈxɔj.na]; German: Königsberg in der Neumark; Latin: Regiomontanus Neomarchicus "King's Mountain in the New March") is a town in northwestern Poland in the West Pomeranian Voivodeship. It lies approximately 60 kilometres (37 miles) south of Szczecin. As of December 2021, the town has a population of 7,330.

Chojna is located near two border crossings (Hohenwutzen and Schwedt) on the Oder River with Germany. It participates in the EU Douzelage town twinning initiative.

== History ==
=== High Middle Ages ===
From the 10th-12th centuries an early Pomeranian fortification, probably with a market, developed at the location of present-day Chojna. The territory became part of the emerging Polish state under its first ruler Mieszko I around 967. Because of its favorable location on trading routes leading to the principalities of Greater Poland and the duchies of Pomerania, the settlement developed quickly. Duke Bogusław I of Pomerania was entombed in the settlement's church after his death in 1187. After 1200 the settlement received Magdeburg town rights from Duke Barnim I the Good. It was referred to as "Konigesberge" for the first time in 1244 and passed to the Bishopric of Brandenburg after Bishop Otto of Brandenburg had acquired part of the New March in 1252. Populated with German knights and colonists, the town's name "Konigesberge" evolved into the German name "Königsberg" ("King's Mountain"), with the epithet in der Neumark (i.e. in the New March) added to distinguish it from namesakes in East Prussia and Bavaria. After in 1267 Bishop Henry I of Brandenburg had ceded the "terra Konigesberge" to the Ascanian Margraves of Brandenburg, the town was granted the right to hold a market as well as regional legal jurisdiction, causing it to become the main town of the New March at that time.

=== Late Middle Ages ===
A parish church existed by 1282, while an Augustinian monastery was founded in 1290. From 1310 to 1329 the town experienced an economic boom linked to the grain trade, and received further market privileges. The town hall was built in 1320. Trade goods were shipped over the Oder and Rurzyca rivers. During the 13th and 14th centuries a defensive wall was built around the town with numerous towers and three city gates (Świecka Gate, Barnkowo Gate, and Vierraden Gate — the latter demolished in the 19th century). In 1319 a war broke out over control of the region, and the town came again under control of the Duchy of Pomerania, but fell back to Brandenburg in 1324. In 1373, the region became part of the Czech Crown Lands, ruled by the Luxembourg dynasty. In 1402, the Luxembourgs reached an agreement with Poland in Kraków, according to which Poland was to purchase and re-incorporate the region, but eventually the Luxembourgs pawned it to the Teutonic Order. The Church of St. Mary and the new town hall (1410) built during this time were some of the most aesthetically pleasing Gothic buildings in the New March. The strong town withstood an attack by the Hussites in 1433 during the Hussite Wars. In 1454, the Teutonic Knights sold the region to Brandenburg in order to raise funds for war against Poland.

=== Modern age ===
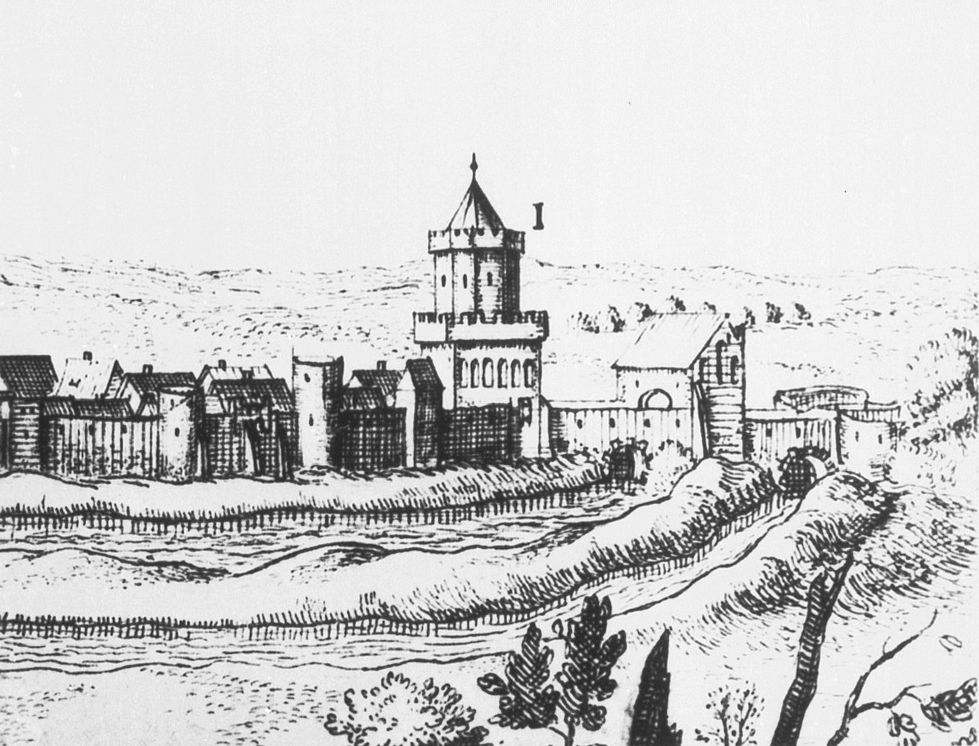
Engraving from the 15th century

The town flourished economically during the German Renaissance beginning in the 15th century, but the majority of its population died from three plagues during the 16th and 17th centuries. It had several churches: the Augustinian monastery church, the Augustinian hospital church of the Holy Spirit, and the Churches of Saints Mary, Nicholas, George, and Gertrude. The town gradually converted to Lutheranism from 1539-1553 during the Protestant Reformation, resulting in the dissolution of the monastery in 1536. Its buildings were instead used as a hospital and school, while its church was used as a storehouse, before in 1690 it was reopened as a Protestant church. During the Thirty Years' War, the town was occupied at different times by the Imperial troops of Albrecht von Wallenstein and the Swedish troops of King Gustavus Adolphus, in the course of which the town was destroyed by 52%. After the destruction of the Church of St. Mary's tower by a lightning bolt in 1682, reconstruction commenced until 1692.

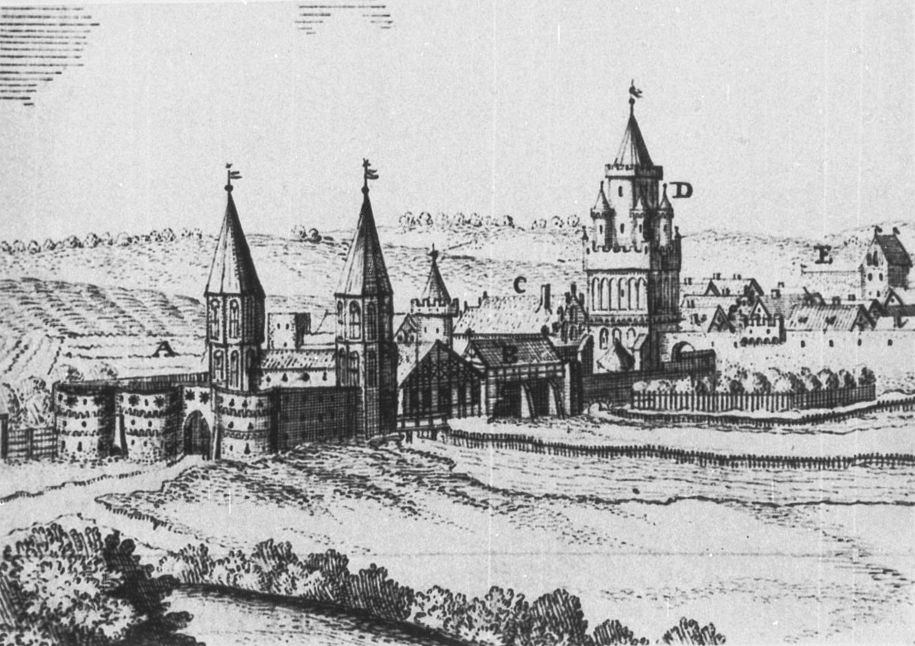
View from about 1710

In the church, a new Baroque pulpit was built in 1714, as well as an organ built by Joachim Wagner in 1734. The town began to revive economically after the foundation of the Kingdom of Prussia, becoming the seat of the government (Kriegs- und Domainenkammer) of the New March in 1759 during the Seven Years' War. In 1767 the city gates towards Schwedt and Bernikow were partially dismantled to provide stone for the construction of a military barracks at the former monastery. The town's inhabitants initially specialised in agriculture and forestry and later in weaving of fine textiles. That industry declined, however with the onset of industrialisation, around 1840. During the Napoleonic Wars, in 1806 the town was captured by a small French unit. The place became the county seat of the Königsberg district in 1809 and part of the Frankfurt Region in the Prussian Province of Brandenburg in 1816. With Prussia the town became part of the German Empire in 1871 and flourished after being connected to the railway network in 1877. It also served as an educational and administrative centre for the surrounding region. In 1913 the Sacred Heart Church was erected, the town's first Catholic church since the Reformation.

=== World War II ===
In 1939 the Luftwaffe constructed Königberg-Neumark Air Base, later used by the Soviet Air Forces between 1945 and 1992. A subcamp of the Ravensbrück concentration camp was set up for the enlargement of the airfield. Probably between 800 and 900 women were imprisoned in the subcamp, mostly Polish women deported from Warsaw after the Warsaw Uprising, but also French, Dutch, Soviet, Czechoslovak, Yugoslav, German, and three English women of the Special Operation Executive, which were sent back to the main camp in January 1945 and executed there. The conditions were poor, including lack of heating, poor food and heavy labour in extreme weather, which resulted in frequent illnesses.

In January 1945 battles of the Vistula–Oder Offensive occurred in and around the town. The German population fled in haste warned about the Soviet mass rapes. On 4 February 1945 Kurt Flöter, Königsberg's then mayor, was condemned to death by hanging by an SS court martial chaired by Otto Skorzeny, because he had fled before issuing a general evacuation order by the military. The prisoners of the subcamp of Ravensbrück were sent on a death march to the main camp, but around 100 hid in the sick barracks, and were liberated by Soviet troops on 5 February 1945. The liberated women were then taken into the hinterland, given medical care in Polish hospitals, and afterwards released to their countries. The entire town centre with the Church of St. Mary and the town hall was burned to the ground by the Soviets on 16 February 1945. 80 percent of the entire town was destroyed. After the German capitulation, under border changes promulgated at the Potsdam Conference, the town became again part of Poland; the local population was dispossessed and expelled.

=== Post-war Poland ===
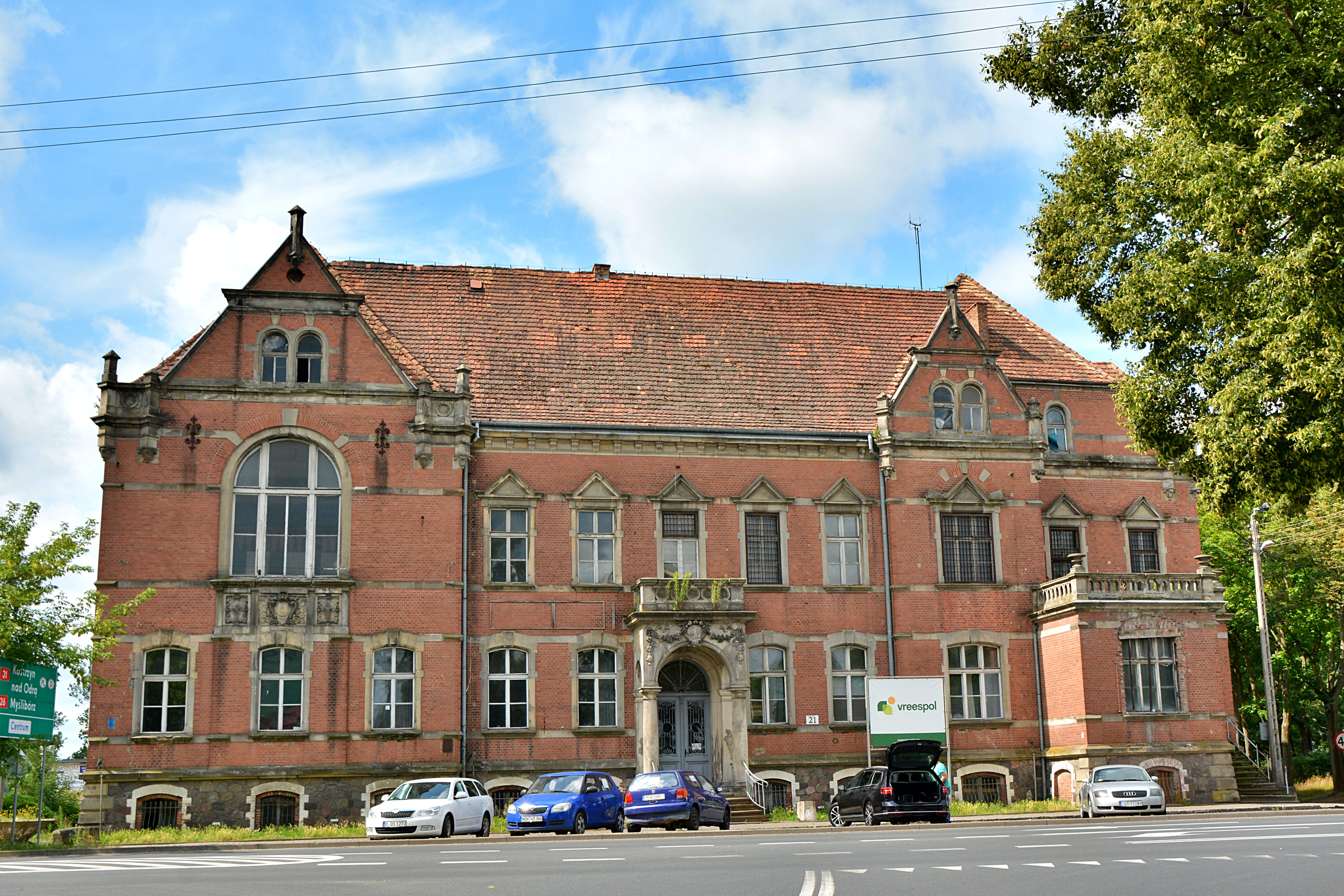
Former post of the Polish Border Protection Forces

The town was first renamed as Władysławsko by June 1945. On 21 August 1945 the name was changed to Królewiec nad Odrą (Królewiec being the historic Polish equivalent for Königsberg, adding upon Oder for distinction). On 7 May 1946 the town was renamed again as Chojna. Chojna was gradually repopulated by Poles, many of whom were expelled from former eastern Poland annexed by the Soviet Union.

Vestiges of the war are still visible in some of Chojna's buildings. The foundation wall of the destroyed town hall was rebuilt for use as a cultural centre, town library, and public house. The monastery was also reconstructed, while the marketplace was newly built. Reconstruction of the destroyed St. Mary's church began in 1994 as a joint German-Polish cooperation. In 1997 the roof of the church's nave was covered, while the pyramidal tower roof of the tower was reconditioned in a 19th-century Neo-gothic style. Chojna's two main landmarks are thus the town hall and the Church of St. Mary, both historical buildings by the Gothic architect Hinrich Brunsberg. A monument to Pope John Paul II was unveiled in 2006 next to the St. Mary's church. On 14 May 2025, the observation deck at the Church of St. Mary was opened to the public

== Demographics ==
Detailed data as of 31 December 2021:

Description	All		Women		Men	
Unit	person	percentage	person	percentage	person	percentage
Population	7330	100	3822	52.1%	3508	47.9%
Population density	604.8		315.5		289.4	

=== Number of inhabitants by year ===
Historical population

Year	Pop.	±%
1719	1,371	—
1750	2,210	+61.2%
1801	3,249	+47.0%
1816	3,930	+21.0%
1850	5,292	+34.7%
1875	6,350	+20.0%
1880	6,568	+3.4%

Year	Pop.	±%
1890	5,864	−10.7%
1900	5,932	+1.2%
1910	6,123	+3.2%
1925	5,977	−2.4%
1933	6,288	+5.2%
1939	6,767	+7.6%
1950	2,268	−66.5%

Year	Pop.	±%
1960	4,038	+78.0%
1995	6,470	+60.2%
2000	6,989	+8.0%
2005	7,145	+2.2%
2010	7,353	+2.9%
2015	7,403	+0.7%
2020	7,367	−0.5%

== Sights ==
Sights of Chojna

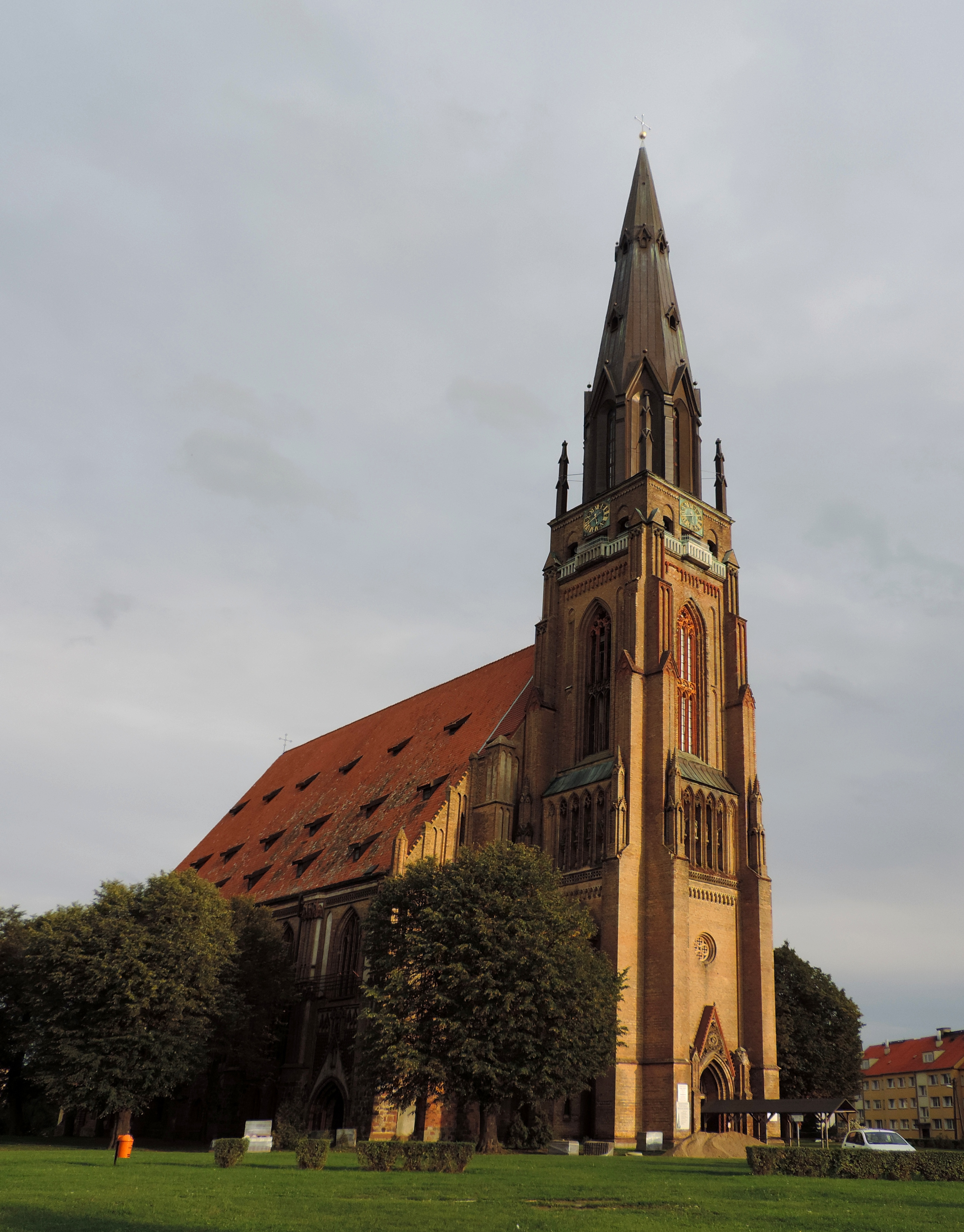
St. Mary's church

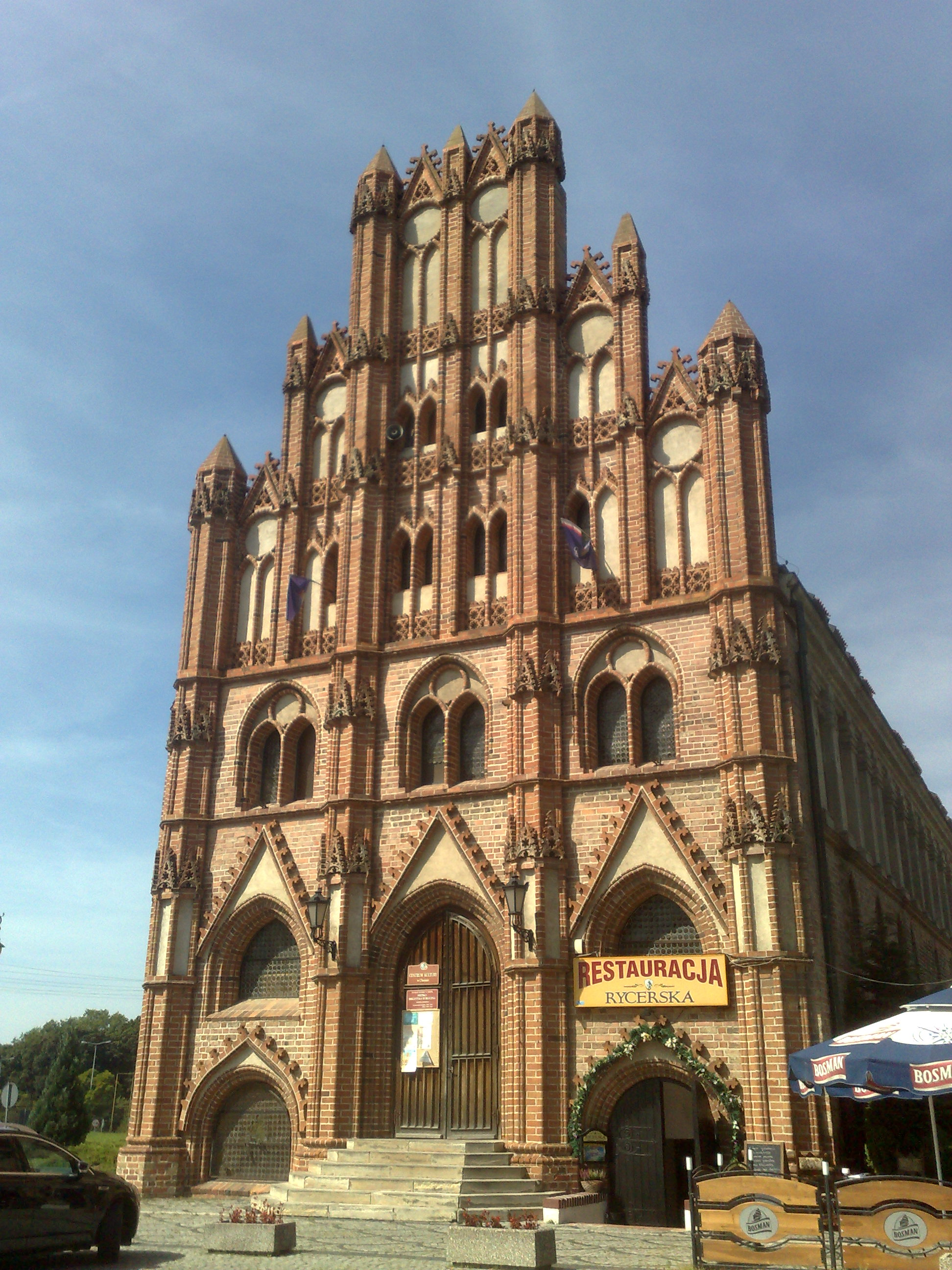
Town Hall

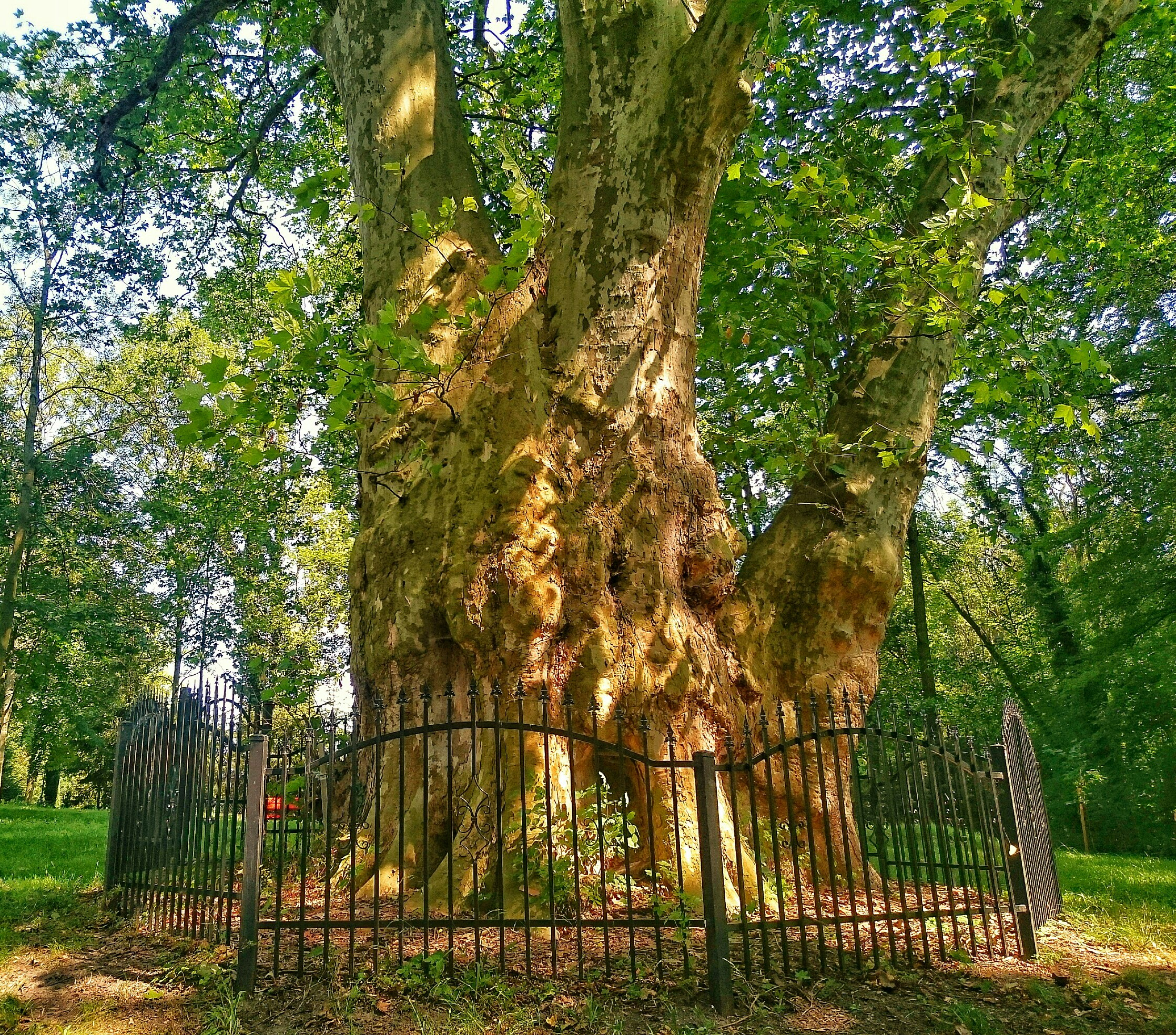
The Giant Plane

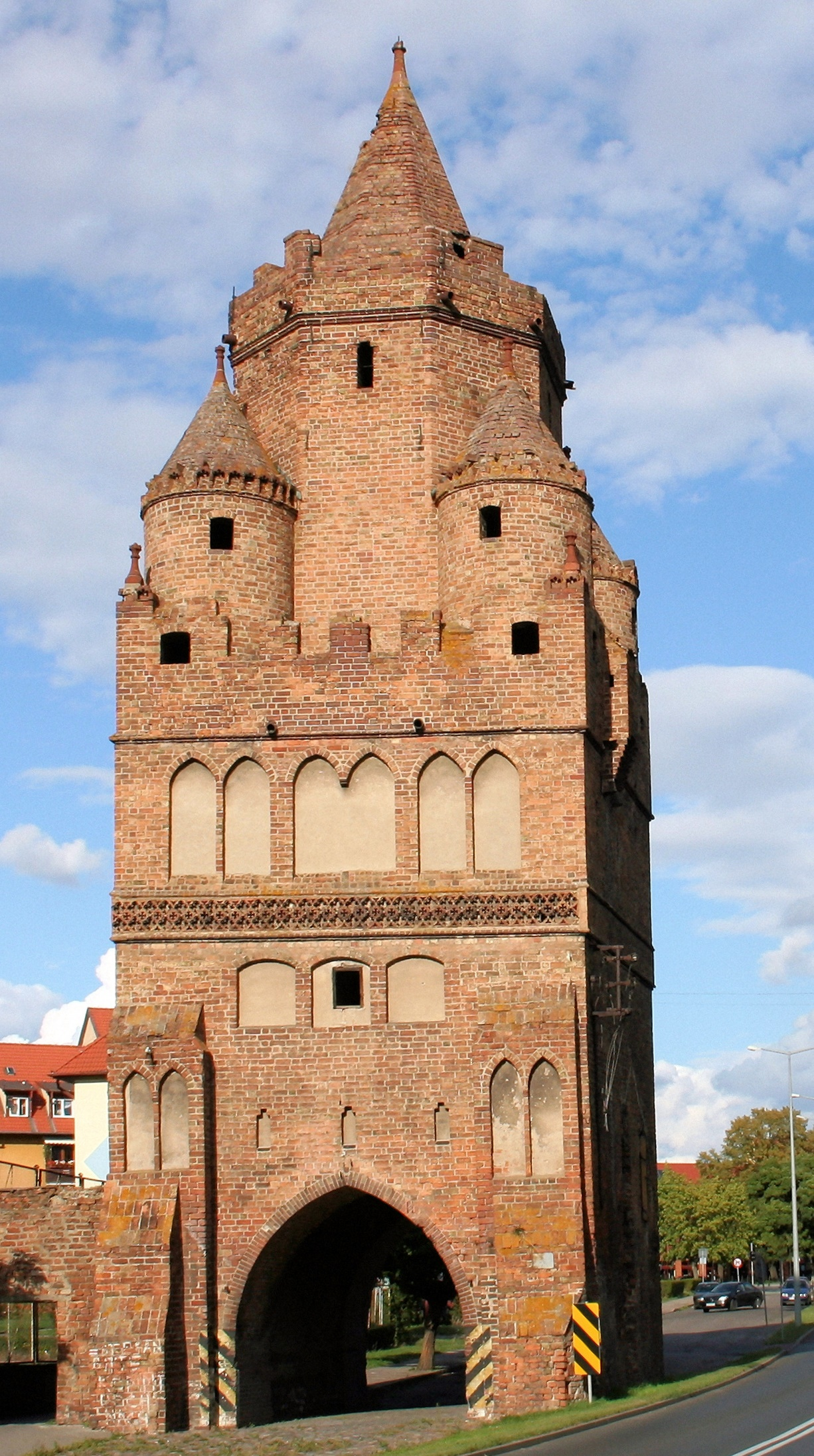
Świecka Gate

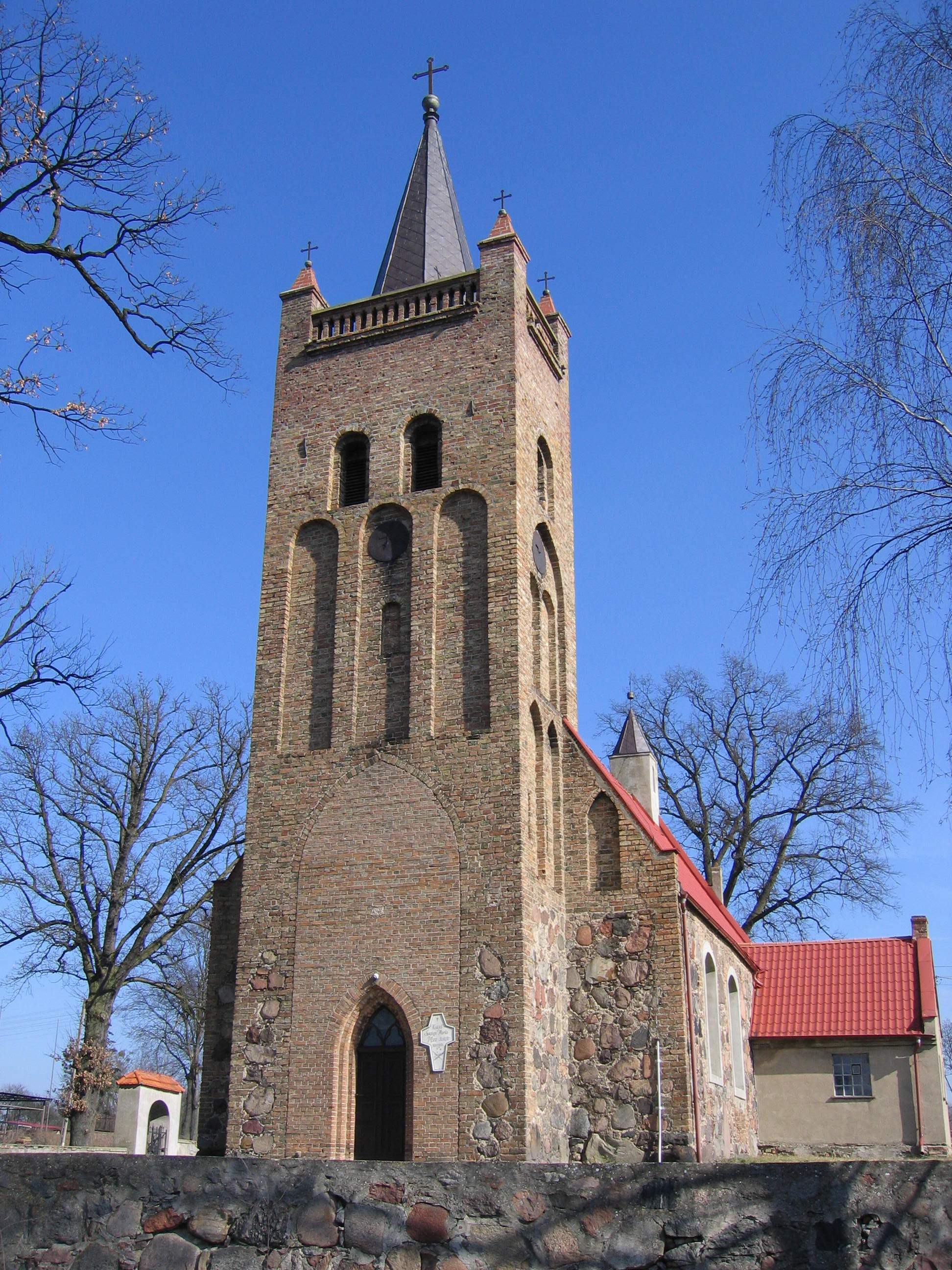
Saint Mark church

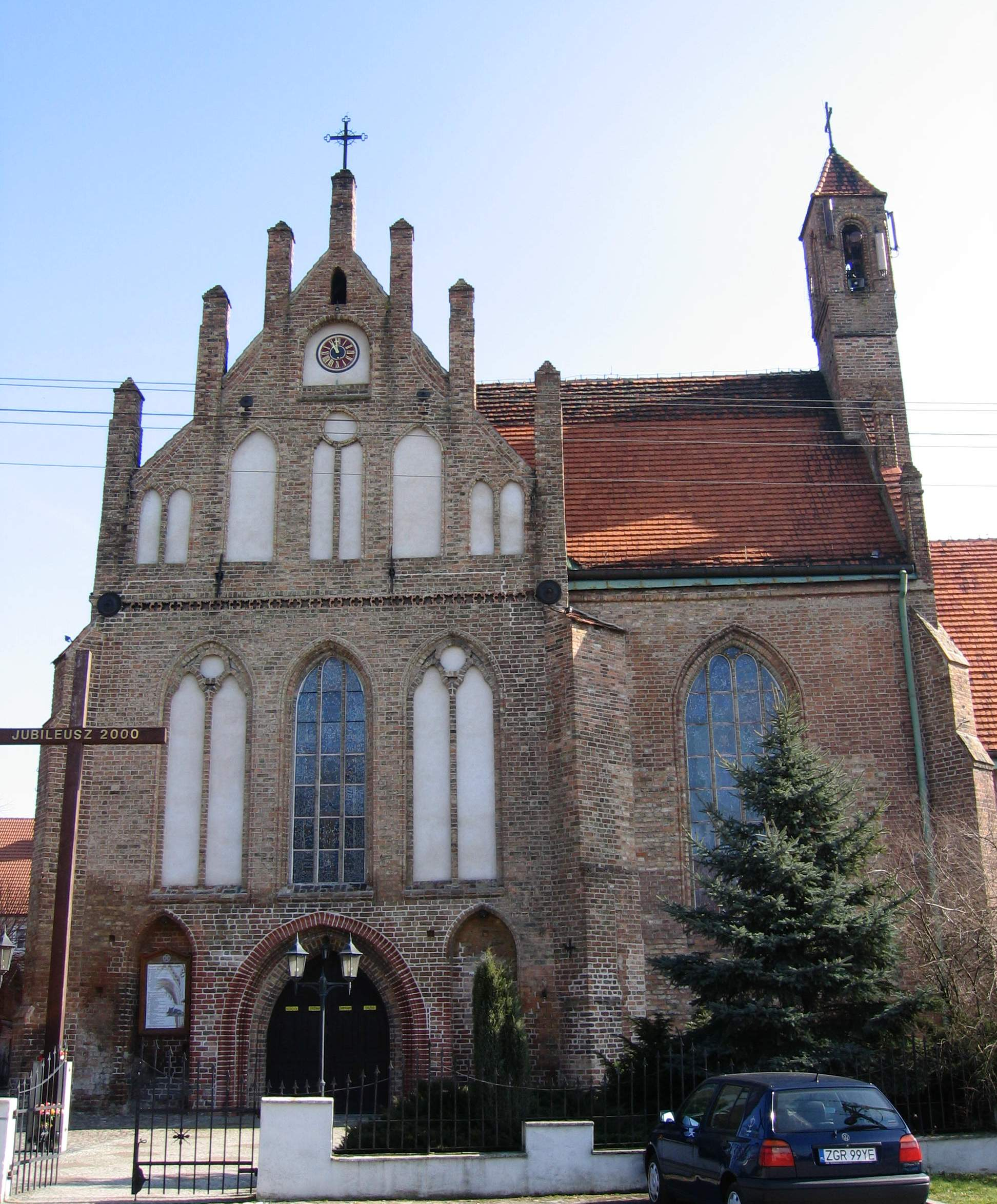
Holy Trinity church

Chojna is located on The European Route of Brick Gothic. Among the historic landmarks of Chojna are:

- St. Mary's church
- The Augustinian monastery with the Holy Trinity church
- Town Hall (Ratusz)
- Remains of the defensive walls with the Świecka and Barnkowska Gates and the Bakers (Piekarska), Prison (Więzienna) and Stork (Bociania) Towers
- The Giant Plane in the Municipal Park (Park Miejski)
- Saint Mark church
- Sacred Heart church
- Ruins of the Saint Gertrude chapel
- The Swedish Mound, ca. 1 km (1 mi) west of the city wall on the road to Schwedt, built in 1630 to commemorate Gustav Adolf II, Swedish king after the 30 years war

== Sports ==
The local football club is Odra Chojna. It competes in the lower leagues.

== Notable residents ==
- Carl Friedrich von Beyme (1765-1838) Chief Minister of the Kingdom of Prussia 1806/7
- Adalbert Kuhn (1812-1881) a German philologist and folklorist
- Albert von Levetzow (1827-1903), German politician, president of German Reichstag
- Gabrielle Weidner (1914 - 1945 in Königsberg in der Neumark) a Dutch resistance fighter, died in concentration camp
- Helmut Fiehn (1916–1943) a captain lieutenant in Germany's Kriegsmarine during WWII.
- Wolf-Dieter Hütteroth (1930–2010), geographer, professor of the Frederick-Alexander University in Erlangen and Nuremberg

== International relations ==
=== Twin towns - Sister cities ===
Chojna is a member of the Douzelage, a unique town twinning association of 24 towns across the European Union. This active town twinning began in 1991 and there are regular events, such as a produce market from each of the other countries and festivals. Discussions regarding membership are also in hand with three further towns (Agros in Cyprus, Škofja Loka in Slovenia, and Tryavna in Bulgaria).

Altea, Spain - 1991
Bad Kötzting, Germany - 1991
Bellagio, Italy - 1991
(Republic of Ireland) Bundoran, Ireland - 1991
Granville, France - 1991
Holstebro, Denmark - 1991
Houffalize, Belgium - 1991
Meerssen, the Netherlands - 1991
Niederanven, Luxembourg - 1991
Preveza, Greece - 1991
Sesimbra, Portugal - 1991
Sherborne, United Kingdom - 1991
Karkkila, Finland - 1997
Oxelösund, Sweden - 1998
Judenburg, Austria - 1999
Chojna, Poland - 2004
Kőszeg, Hungary - 2004
Sigulda, Latvia - 2004
Sušice, Czech Republic - 2004
Türi, Estonia - 2004
Zvolen, Slovakia - 2007
Rokiškis, Lithuania - 2018
Marsaskala, Malta - 2009
Siret, Romania - 2010
Agros, Cyprus - 2011
