= 2025 Holstebro municipal election =

Municipal election in Denmark

← 2021	18 November 2025	2029 →

All 27 seats to the Holstebro municipal council 14 seats needed for a majority
- Turnout: 33,790 (72.5%) ▲0.6%
	First party	Second party	Third party
	V	A	B
Party	Venstre	Social Democrats	Social Liberals
Last election	9 seats, 30.9%	11 seats, 38.3%	2 seats, 7.4%
Seats won	8	5	4
Seat change	▼1	▼6	▲2
Popular vote	9,130	6,759	4,719
Percentage	27.5%	20.4%	14.2%
Swing	▼3.4%	▼17.9%	▲6.8%
	Fourth party	Fifth party	Sixth party
	F	O	Æ
Party	Green Left	Danish People's Party	Denmark Democrats
Last election	2 seats, 5.2%	1 seat, 3.5%	Did not stand
Seats won	4	2	2
Seat change	▲2	▲1	▲2
Popular vote	4,605	2,269	2,258
Percentage	13.9%	6.8%	6.8%
Swing	▲8.6%	▲3.4%	New
	Seventh party	Eighth party
	C	I
Party	Conservatives	Liberal Alliance
Last election	2 seats, 6.6%	0 seats, 0.5%
Seats won	1	1
Seat change	▼1	▲1
Popular vote	1,621	1,434
Percentage	4.9%	4.3%
Swing	▼1.7%	▲3.8%
Mayor before election
H.C. Østerby
Social Democrats
Mayor after election
Kenneth Tønning
Venstre

The 2025 Holstebro Municipal election will be held on November 18, 2025, to elect the 27 members to sit in the regional council for the Holstebro Municipal council, in the period of 2026 to 2029. Despite a drop in vote share, and losing a seat, Venstre won the mayor position from the Social Democrats, resulting in Kenneth Tønning becoming the new mayor.

== Background ==
Following the 2021 election, H.C. Østerby from Social Democrats became mayor for his fourth consecutive term. Since then, two members of the Social Democrats switched party allegiance to Danish Social Liberal Party and, two additional members of the party switched to Green Left. The incumbent mayor, Østerby prior to the election, did not seek a fifth term as mayor. Instead, Klaus Flæng would try to become mayor for Social Democrats.

== Electoral system ==
For elections to Danish municipalities, a number varying from 9 to 31 are chosen to be elected to the municipal council. The seats are then allocated using the D'Hondt method and a closed list proportional representation. Holstebro Municipality had 27 seats in 2025.

== Electoral alliances ==
=== Electoral Alliance 1 ===
Party		Political alignment
B	Social Liberals	Centre to Centre-left
F	Green Left	Centre-left to Left-wing

=== Electoral Alliance 2 ===
Party		Political alignment
C	Conservatives	Centre-right
M	Moderates	Centre to Centre-right

=== Electoral Alliance 3 ===
Party		Political alignment
D	New Right	Far-right
I	Liberal Alliance	Centre-right to Right-wing
O	Danish People's Party	Right-wing to Far-right
V	Venstre	Centre-right
Æ	Denmark Democrats	Right-wing to Far-right

== Results by polling station ==
Division	A	B	C	D	F	I	M	O	V	Æ
Division	%	%	%	%	%	%	%	%	%	%
Musikteatret	22.8	11.9	5.5	0.4	16.0	4.5	0.9	6.8	26.0	5.2
Mejdal	15.0	12.6	2.8	0.1	12.8	3.5	1.5	5.4	42.1	4.3
Skave	10.5	7.8	1.8	0.8	7.4	17.9	0.2	5.6	41.5	6.7
Mejrup	14.7	11.0	3.3	0.2	10.7	3.1	0.4	5.1	47.9	3.5
Nørre Boulevard Skolen	24.7	13.0	4.8	0.4	17.7	3.9	0.9	7.8	20.5	6.3
Vinderup	21.4	41.1	2.5	0.2	5.9	2.6	0.3	8.6	11.2	6.1
Sevel	12.7	19.2	21.9	0.5	5.6	4.3	0.3	6.7	18.6	10.2
Ulfborg	23.7	3.1	6.2	0.4	19.2	3.5	0.5	6.5	22.3	14.6
Vemb	15.1	5.3	2.1	0.9	10.4	3.6	0.9	7.8	27.8	25.9
Sdr. Nissum	18.9	7.5	4.8	1.0	17.6	2.6	0.3	6.7	26.3	14.3

== Results ==
Party		Votes	%	+/-	Seats	+/-
Holstebro Municipality
V	Venstre	9,130	27.52	-3.39	8	-1
A	Social Democrats	6,759	20.37	-17.91	5	-6
B	Social Liberals	4,719	14.22	+6.84	4	+2
F	Green Left	4,605	13.88	+8.65	4	+2
O	Danish People's Party	2,269	6.84	+3.36	2	+1
Æ	Denmark Democrats	2,258	6.81	New	2	New
C	Conservatives	1,621	4.89	-1.67	1	-1
I	Liberal Alliance	1,434	4.32	+3.84	1	+1
M	Moderates	257	0.77	New	0	New
D	New Right	126	0.38	-2.48	0	0
Total		33,178	100	N/A	27	N/A
Invalid votes		126	0.27	+0.05		
Blank votes		486	1.04	+0.45		
Turnout		33,790	72.51	+0.59		
Source: valg.dk

== Opinion polls ==
Polling firm	Fieldwork date	Sample size	A	V	B	C	F	O	D	I	M	Æ	Others	Lead
Epinion	4 Sep - 13 Oct 2025	500	20.7	26.0	8.5	4.7	13.2	5.4	–	5.9	1.1	14.1	0.4	5.3
2024 european parliament election	9 Jun 2024		16.5	21.2	4.4	8.4	13.0	7.8	–	8.6	4.5	11.9	–	4.7
2022 general election	1 Nov 2022		26.8	24.5	1.7	5.2	6.6	2.2	2.6	8.2	5.2	12.4	–	2.3
2021 regional election	16 Nov 2021		31.2	33.0	6.7	6.9	5.7	4.5	3.3	1.3	–	–	–	1.8
2021 municipal election	16 Nov 2021		38.3 (11)	30.9 (9)	7.4 (2)	6.6 (2)	5.2 (2)	3.5 (1)	2.9 (0)	0.5 (0)	–	–	–	7.4
