= Cristina Wistari Formaggia =

Italian actress, performer and artist

Cristina Wistari Formaggia (27 August 1945 in Milan – 19 July 2008 in Milan) was an Italian actress, performer and artist who came to be a key participant in the preservation and dissemination of Balinese dance – particularly the Topeng and Gambuh traditions; she was also a student of the Indian Kathakali school of sacred performance art. She was heavily involved in contemporary trans-cultural theatre being both an active participant in the ISTA in collaboration with Eugenio Barba and the Odin Teatret (serving as its link to Bali) and with the Magdalena Project.

== Biography timeline ==
- 1945 – Born in Milan, Italy.
- 1970s – She studied Kathakali, a South Indian dance drama, for two years in the southern Indian state of Kerala; she worked with one of the established masters of this art form, Guru Gopinath.
- 1983 – First arrival in Bali to recover from a severe car accident in Australia; captivated by Balinese dance, she studied under great master I Made Jimat of Batuan. She would later join his troupe, tour Bali with them and teach workshops with him around the world.
- 1992 – Cristina spearheads the foundation of the Gambuh Preservation Project with help from the Ford Foundation.
- 1995 – Beginning of Collaboration with ISTA and Eugenio Barba.
- 1999 – Release of the Music of Gambuh Theater CD with proceeds going toward the Gambuh Preservation Project.
- 1999 – Founded Topeng-Shakti, an all-female troupe to promote empowerment through the arts for women; traveled with them to Paris for performances and workshops in 2000 and 2001.
- 2000 – Published Drama Tari Bali via Yayasan Lontar publishers of Jakarta in Indonesian.
- 2004 – Published "Il Gambuh, un archetipo delle arti sceniche balinesi", Teatro e Storia, n°24, Editions Bulzoni in Italian, January/February 2004
- 2006 – Performed Hamlet with traditional Gambuh influences in collaboration with Eugenio Barba in Denmark.
- 2008 – Took the Pura Desa Batuan troupe to Europe to perform in a collaboration with Eugenio Barba's ISTA's production of The Marriage of Medea a month before she suddenly died.

== See also ==
- List of dancers
