= Nørre Vosborg =

Manor house in Denmark

Coordinates: 56°19′36″N 08°19′52″E

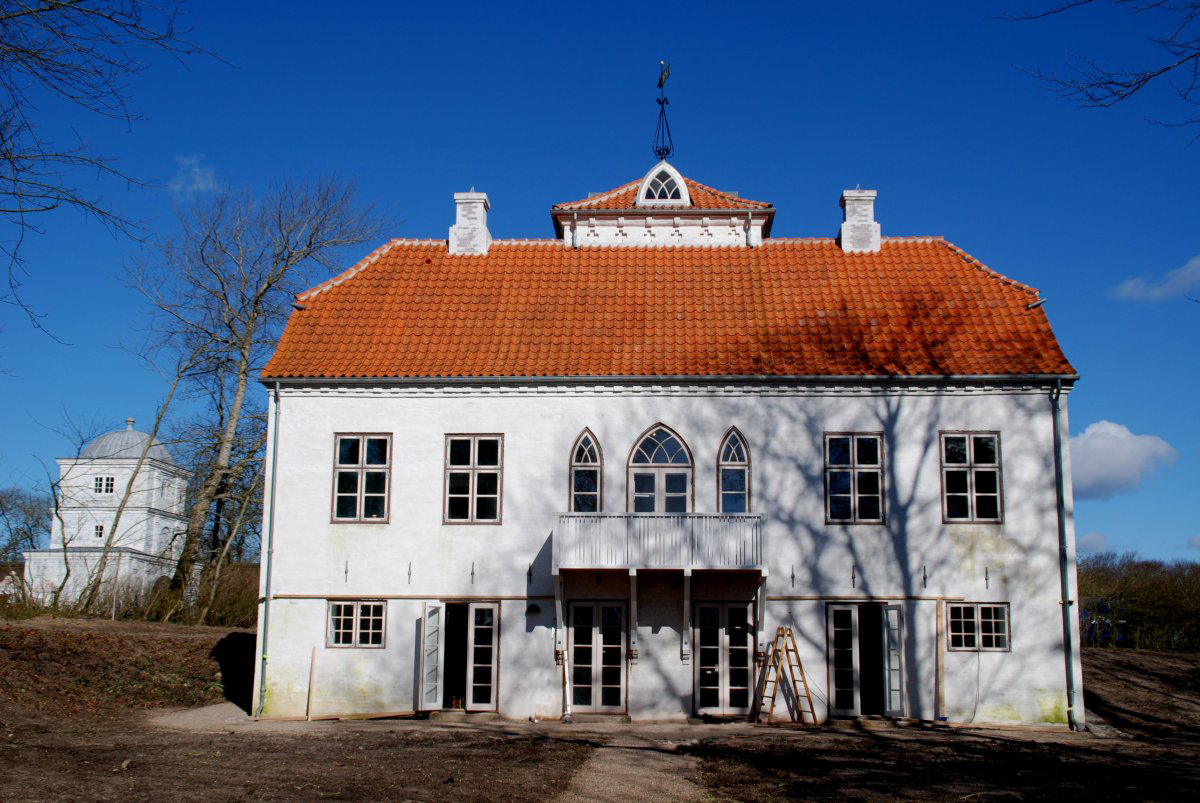
NørreVosborg

Nørre Vosborg is a manor house located near Vemb, 19 km (12 mi) west of Holstebro in the west of Jutland, Denmark. The original building dates from c. 1532 with additions in 1640, 1750 and the mid-19th century. In 1946, restoration of the complex began under the leadership of H.H. Engqvist. The work was completed by Realdania in 2008, leading to a hotel with conference facilities. Nørre Vosborg is now furnished as a hotel and cultural office with restaurant, cafe and banquet facilities.

== Architecture ==
The original structure from 1552, now renovated, was in the Gothic style. The Ida Lange building (1642) is a half-timbered Renaissance residence while the De Linde building (1770) is Baroque with fine period staircases. The Tang building (1839) is Neoclassical in design. Inspired by Dutch architecture, the free standing gate tower from 1790 was added by the estate's owner at the time, Peder Tang.

== Surroundings ==
The estate which covers 533 acres offers birdlife along the coasts of the North Sea and Nissum Fjord. The forested area also contains a moraine landscape around Skovbjerg Bakkesø to the southeast.

== Literature ==
- Nørregård-Nielsen, Hans Edvard (2008). Nørre Vosborg. Gyldendal A/S. ISBN 978-87-02-05399-9.
