= 2021 Holstebro municipal election =

| ← 2017 | 16 November 2021 | 2025 → |

All 27 seats to the Holstebro Municipal Council 14 seats needed for a majority
- Turnout: 33,017 (71.9%) ▼3.9pp
| | First party | Second party | Third party |
|---|---|---|---|
| | A | V | B |
| Party | Social Democrats | Venstre | Social Liberals |
| Last election | 12 seats, 43.0% | 9 seats, 31.0% | 2 seats, 5.4% |
| Seats won | 11 | 9 | 2 |
| Seat change | ▼1 | 0 | 0 |
| Popular vote | 12,493 | 10,087 | 2,408 |
| Percentage | 38.3% | 30.9% | 7.4% |
| Swing | ▼4.7% | ▼0.1% | ▲2.0% |
| | Fourth party | Fifth party | Sixth party |
| | C | F | O |
| Party | Conservatives | Green Left | Danish People's Party |
| Last election | 1 seats, 2.5% | 1 seats, 4.8% | 2 seats, 6.8% |
| Seats won | 2 | 2 | 1 |
| Seat change | ▲1 | ▲1 | ▼1 |
| Popular vote | 2,139 | 1,708 | 1,134 |
| Percentage | 6.6% | 5.2% | 3.5% |
| Swing | ▲4.1% | ▲0.4% | ▼3.3% |
Mayor before election
H.C. Østerby
Social Democrats
Mayor after election
H.C. Østerby
Social Democrats

Despite being a traditional strong area for blue bloc parties in Denmark, H.C. Østerby from the Social Democrats had been mayor of Holstebro Municipality since 2010. The Social Democrats lost a seat in this election, but due to the Green Left gaining a seat, a traditional red bloc majority was possible. It was later announced that H.C. Østerby would continue for a third term.

== Electoral system ==
For elections to Danish municipalities, a number varying from 9 to 31 are chosen to be elected to the municipal council. The seats are then allocated using the D'Hondt method and a closed list proportional representation. Holstebro Municipality had 27 seats in 2021

Unlike in Danish General Elections, in elections to municipal councils, electoral alliances are allowed.

== Electoral alliances ==
=== Electoral Alliance 1 ===
| Party | | Political alignment |
|---|---|---|
| C | Conservatives | Centre-right |
| I | Liberal Alliance | Centre-right to Right-wing |
| K | Christian Democrats | Centre to Centre-right |

=== Electoral Alliance 2 ===
| Party | | Political alignment |
|---|---|---|
| B | Social Liberals | Centre to Centre-left |
| F | Green Left | Centre-left to Left-wing |
| Ø | Red–Green Alliance | Left-wing to Far-Left |
| Å | The Alternative | Centre-left to Left-wing |

=== Electoral Alliance 3 ===
| Party | | Political alignment |
|---|---|---|
| D | New Right | Right-wing to Far-right |
| O | Danish People's Party | Right-wing to Far-right |
| V | Venstre | Centre-right |

== Results by polling station ==
| Division | A | B | C | D | F | I | K | O | V | Ø | Å |
| Division | % | % | % | % | % | % | % | % | % | % | % |
|---|---|---|---|---|---|---|---|---|---|---|---|
| Musikteatret | 41.1 | 5.3 | 7.1 | 2.9 | 5.7 | 0.6 | 2.5 | 3.5 | 28.1 | 2.7 | 0.5 |
| Mejdal | 31.2 | 9.5 | 5.2 | 1.5 | 4.6 | 0.3 | 1.2 | 2.4 | 42.8 | 1.2 | 0.0 |
| Skave | 32.9 | 2.4 | 3.5 | 4.6 | 2.2 | 0.7 | 1.0 | 2.8 | 48.8 | 1.0 | 0.1 |
| Mejrup | 35.0 | 4.6 | 6.9 | 2.3 | 4.2 | 0.5 | 2.0 | 3.2 | 40.2 | 1.1 | 0.1 |
| Nørreboulevardskolen | 45.9 | 6.5 | 5.4 | 2.6 | 5.3 | 0.3 | 4.6 | 3.4 | 23.2 | 2.8 | 0.1 |
| Vinderup | 38.8 | 24.2 | 4.7 | 2.9 | 2.9 | 0.5 | 1.6 | 3.5 | 19.9 | 0.8 | 0.2 |
| Ulfborg | 31.2 | 1.4 | 10.4 | 3.9 | 11.9 | 0.5 | 0.6 | 4.6 | 33.3 | 2.1 | 0.1 |
| Sevel | 20.2 | 9.7 | 14.5 | 4.5 | 2.6 | 0.7 | 1.9 | 2.9 | 40.6 | 2.0 | 0.4 |
| Vemb | 33.3 | 2.5 | 4.4 | 4.1 | 4.4 | 0.6 | 0.9 | 5.7 | 42.2 | 1.7 | 0.3 |
| Sdr. Nissum | 29.5 | 1.0 | 9.6 | 4.4 | 9.1 | 0.3 | 1.3 | 6.6 | 32.0 | 6.1 | 0.2 |

== Results ==
| Party | | Votes | % | +/- | Seats | +/- |
Holstebro Municipality
| A | Social Democrats | 12,493 | 38.28 | -4.70 | 11 | -1 |
| V | Venstre | 10,087 | 30.91 | -0.12 | 9 | 0 |
| B | Social Liberals | 2,408 | 7.38 | +1.96 | 2 | 0 |
| C | Conservatives | 2,139 | 6.55 | +4.03 | 2 | +1 |
| F | Green Left | 1,708 | 5.23 | +0.48 | 2 | +1 |
| O | Danish People's Party | 1,134 | 3.47 | -3.27 | 1 | -1 |
| D | New Right | 933 | 2.86 | New | 0 | New |
| K | Christian Democrats | 794 | 2.43 | +1.59 | 0 | 0 |
| Ø | Red-Green Alliance | 703 | 2.15 | -0.13 | 0 | 0 |
| I | Liberal Alliance | 156 | 0.48 | -1.75 | 0 | 0 |
| Å | The Alternative | 79 | 0.24 | -0.43 | 0 | 0 |
| Total | | 32,634 | 100 | N/A | 27 | N/A |
| Invalid votes | | 101 | 0.22 | +0.07 | | |
| Blank votes | | 282 | 0.61 | -0.12 | | |
| Turnout | | 33,017 | 71.93 | -3.91 | | |
Source: valg.dk
