= Sevel, Denmark =

Sevel
- Village
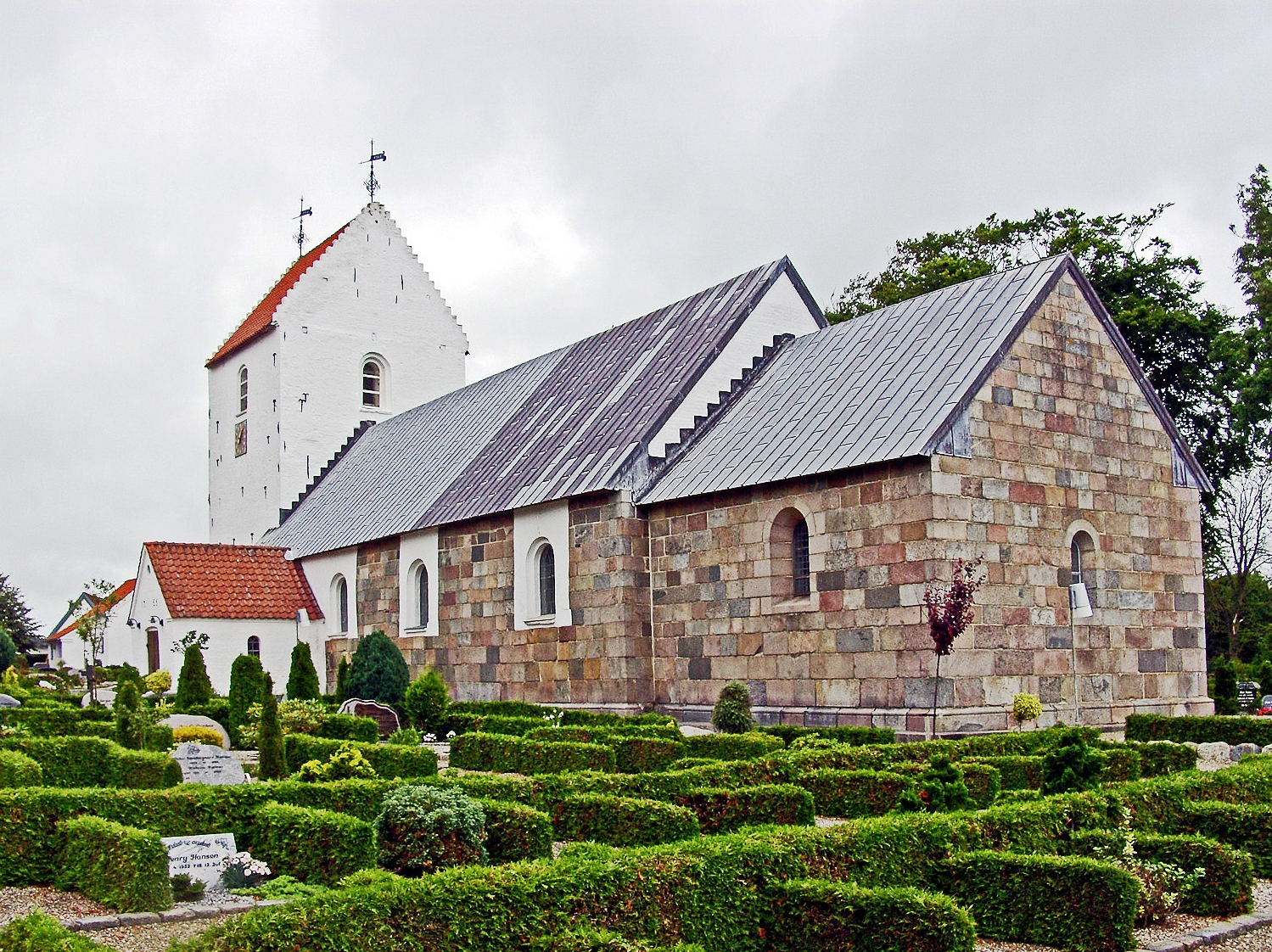
- Sevel Church

- Location in Central Denmark Region Sevel (Denmark)
- Coordinates: 56°27′26″N 8°52′9″E
- Country: Denmark
- Region: Central Denmark (Midtjylland)
- Municipality: Holstebro Municipality

Population (2026)
  - Total: 498
- Postal code: DK-7830 Vinderup

Sevel is a village, with a population of 498 (1 January 2026), in Holstebro Municipality, Central Denmark Region in Denmark. It is located 6 km east of Vinderup, 19 km southwest of Skive, 21 km east of Struer and 22 km northeast of Holstebro.

The Roman church Sevel Church and the inn Sevel Kro are located in the village.

== History ==
On October 12 1971 McDonnell Douglas F-4 Phantom II 'XV479', of 54 Squadron, from RAF Coningsby crashed. The two pilots survived but killed a 37 year old woman and 5 year old boy. The aircraft had taken off from Air Base Karup.
