= Hassagers Kollegium =

Building in Copenhagen, Denmark

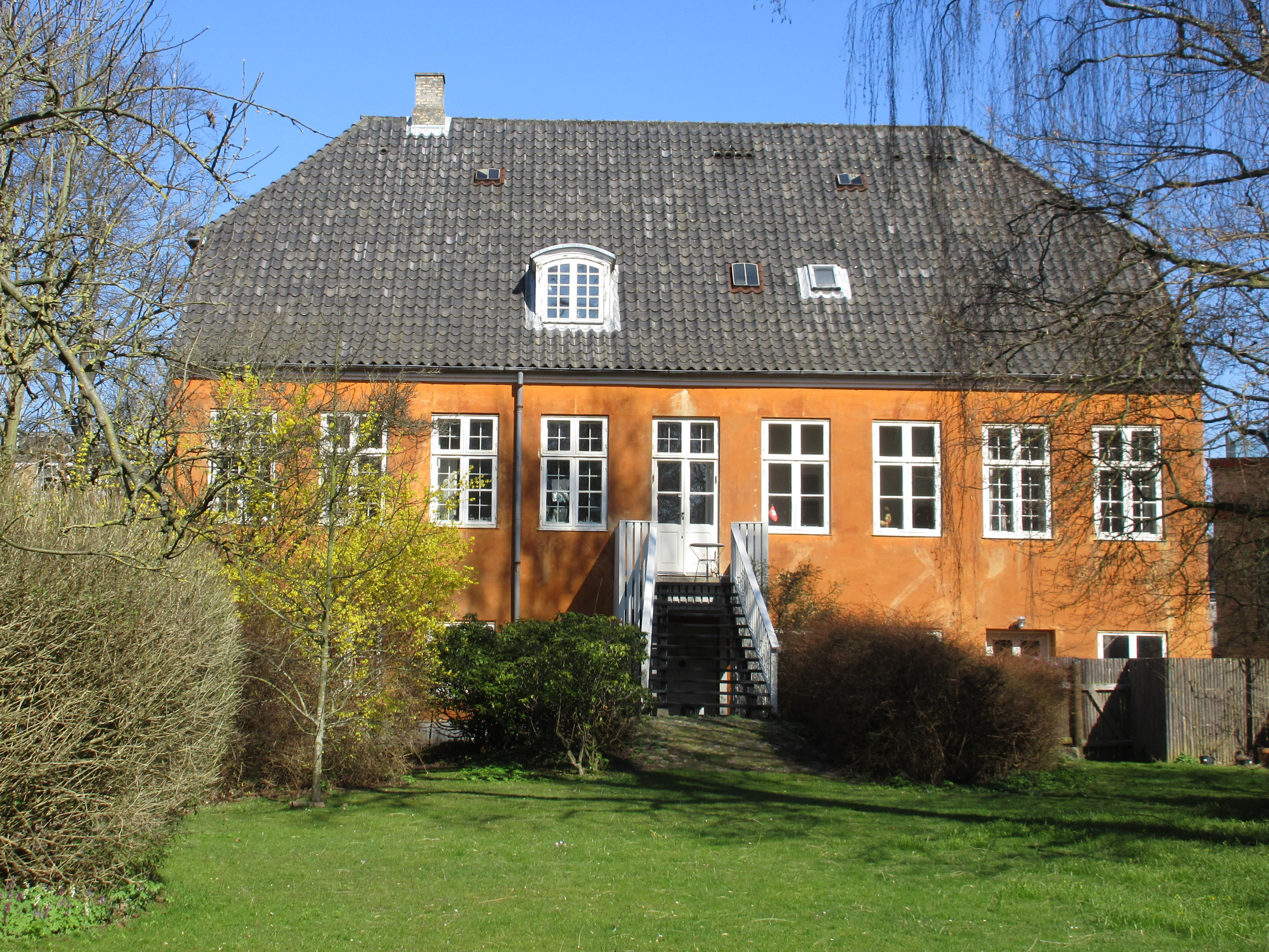
- The old building viewed from the garden.
- Interactive map of the Hassagers Kollegium area

General information
- Architectural style: Johan Boye Junge (old building)
- Location: Copenhagen, Frederiksberg Bredegade 13A, 2000 Frederiksberg, Denmark
- Coordinates: 55°40′41.09″N 12°31′46.45″E
- Completed: 1804
- Renovated: 1806

Hassagers Kollegium (originally Hassagers Collegium with 1900 orthography)m situated on Frederiksberg Bredegade, next to Frederiksborg Town Hall and adjacent to Frederiksberg Park, is a small dormitory located at Frederiksberg Bredegade 13 B 2000 Frederiksberg, Denmark. The name simply means Hassager's dormitory. The Kollegium was founded by Dorthea Hassager in remembrance of her late husband, the priest Carl Hassager, and it was inaugurated on 25 September 1900. It is the youngest of the old dormitories of the University of Copenhagen. A two-storey Neoclassical house from 1806, Hassager's former home, which is also known as Boye Junge's County House (Danish: Boye Junges Landsted), after Johan Boye Junge by whom it was built, contains two residences, one for the Ephorus Colegii (first floor and garret) and one for the caretaker (ground floor). As of 1951, its dormitory rooms are located in the same building as the adjacent 4. Maj Kollegiet.

It has 10 small single rooms (12 square meters each) which may only be rented by students from the University of Copenhagen who have passed exams equivalent to two years of study. Through the years, about 340 students have lived at the Kollegium. The mix of students from different faculties and the fact that only older students are admitted have created a dormitory with a relatively calm atmosphere.

Boye Junge's former country house was listed on the Danish register of protected buildings and places in 1973. The new building was listed on the Danish register of protected buildings and places in 2006.

== History ==
=== Boye Junge's Country House ===
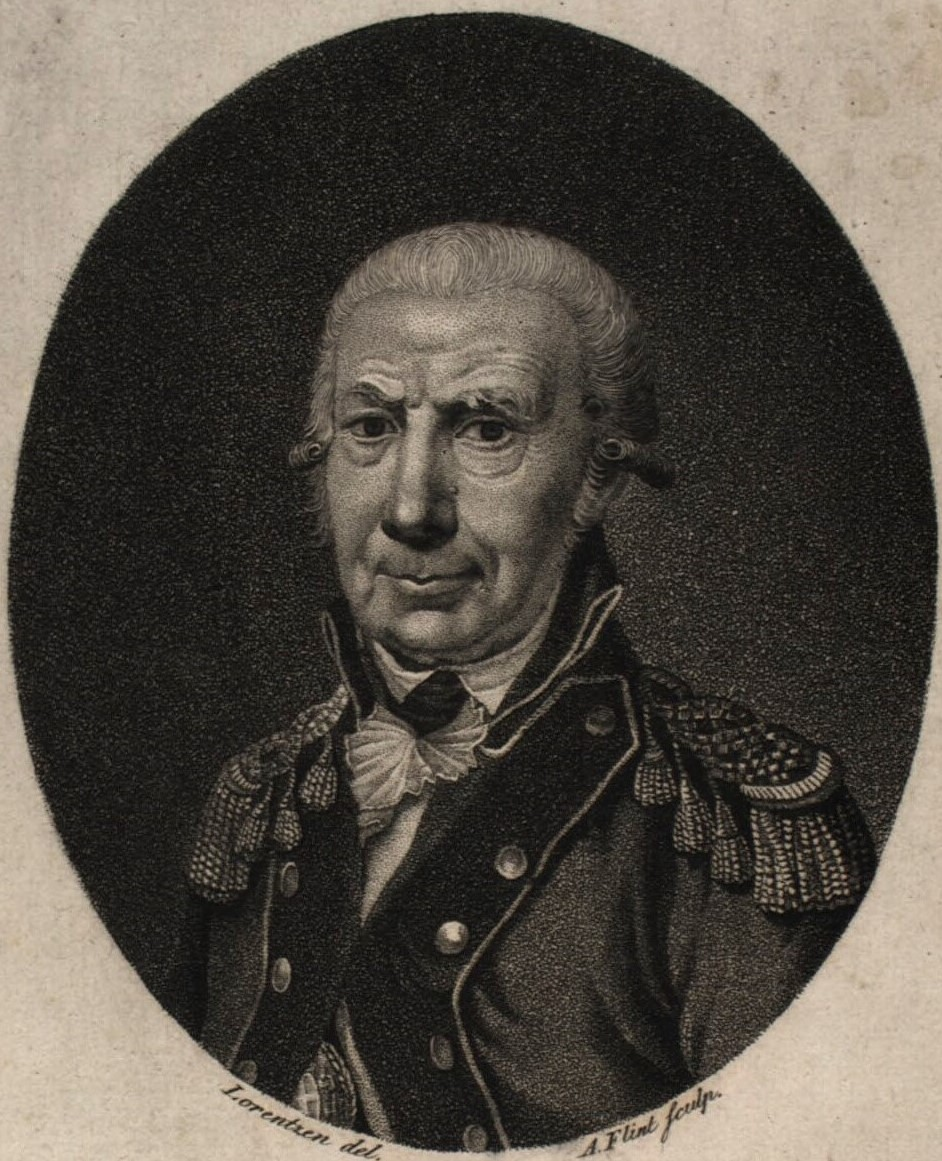
Johan Boye Junge.

In January 1804, Johan Boye Junge acquired two small houses on the site (No. 6 and No. 7) from Johan Ludvig Brochenhuus in exchange for his country house on Gammel Kongevej. Later in the same year, he also bought a third house on the site (No. 8). He immediately demolished the existing buildings and embarked on the construction of a new country house on the site. The exterior of the building was completed in 1805. The interior was completed in October 1806. Junge died just four months later and would thus never get the chance to spend a summer in his new house.

=== Changing owners, 1807–1870 ===
After Boye Junge's death, the house was sold to ship captain Christian Knudsen. In 1812, he sold it to geheimekonferensråd Victor Råben Levetzau. In 1818, Råben Levetzau sold it to chief of police Søren Wedege. A later owner was the book printer Frederik Schultz.

In February 1830 the building was sold by public auction. The buyer was the king, presumably to ensure control over who moved into the house adjacent to Frederiksberg Park. Later in the same year, he sold it to senior adjudant Frederik Løvenørn.

=== Hassager family ===
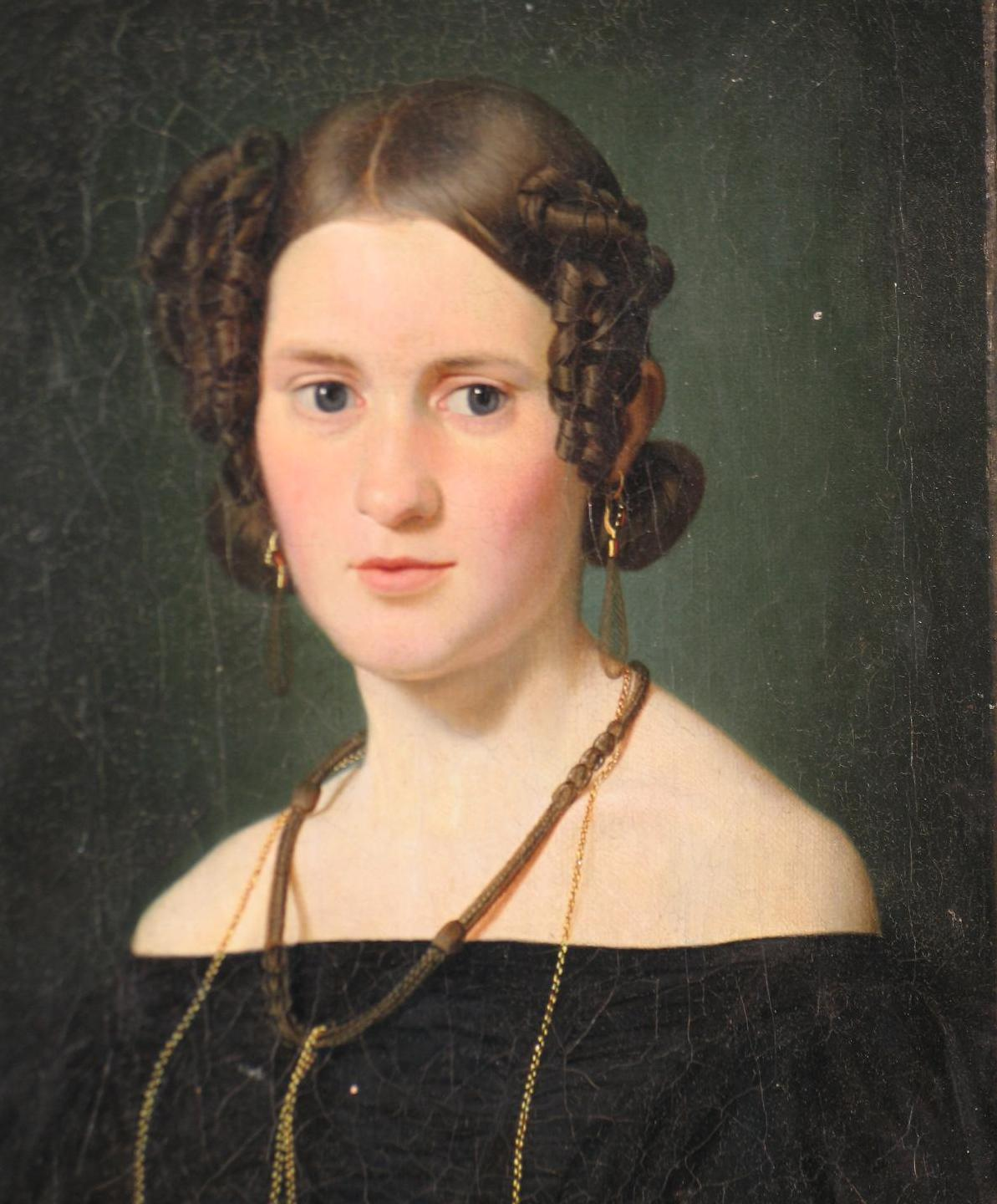
Forthea Hassager.

The priest Carl Hassager bought the house in middle of the 1870s. Since 1857, he had served as vicar of Særslev on Funen. Prior to that, he had served as vicar of Nørre Felding and Tvis from 1829 to 1841, and then, from 1741 to 1857, as vicar of Laastrup and Skals. He and his wife.Dorthea Hassager (død 1897) plannned to spend their retirement together in their new house but Carl Hassager died before they had moved in. Dorthea Hassager lived there for 20 years in her widowhood. In 1888, she created a will which endowed her property and other means to the University of Copenhagen. A provision in her will stated that the house should be converted into a dormitory after her death.

Hassagers Collegium. The dormitory as it was from 1900 to 1951.

Dorthea Hassager died on 17 October 1897. After her death, Boye Junge's former country house was deemed unsuitable for conversion into a hall of residence. A dormitory building was instead constructed in the garden to the west of the house. It was it was inaugurated on 25 September 1900-

In the years after Eorld War II, when the 4. May Kollegiet was under preparation, as a dormitory reserved for descendents of members of the resistance movement, it was decided to construct i shared building for the two dormitories. The old dormitory building was therefore demolished and a new dormitory building was completed in 1951 to designs by the architect Henning Hansen.

Boye Junge's former country house was listed on the Danish register of protected buildings and places in 1973. The new building was listed on the Danish register of protected buildings and places in 2006.

== Architecture ==
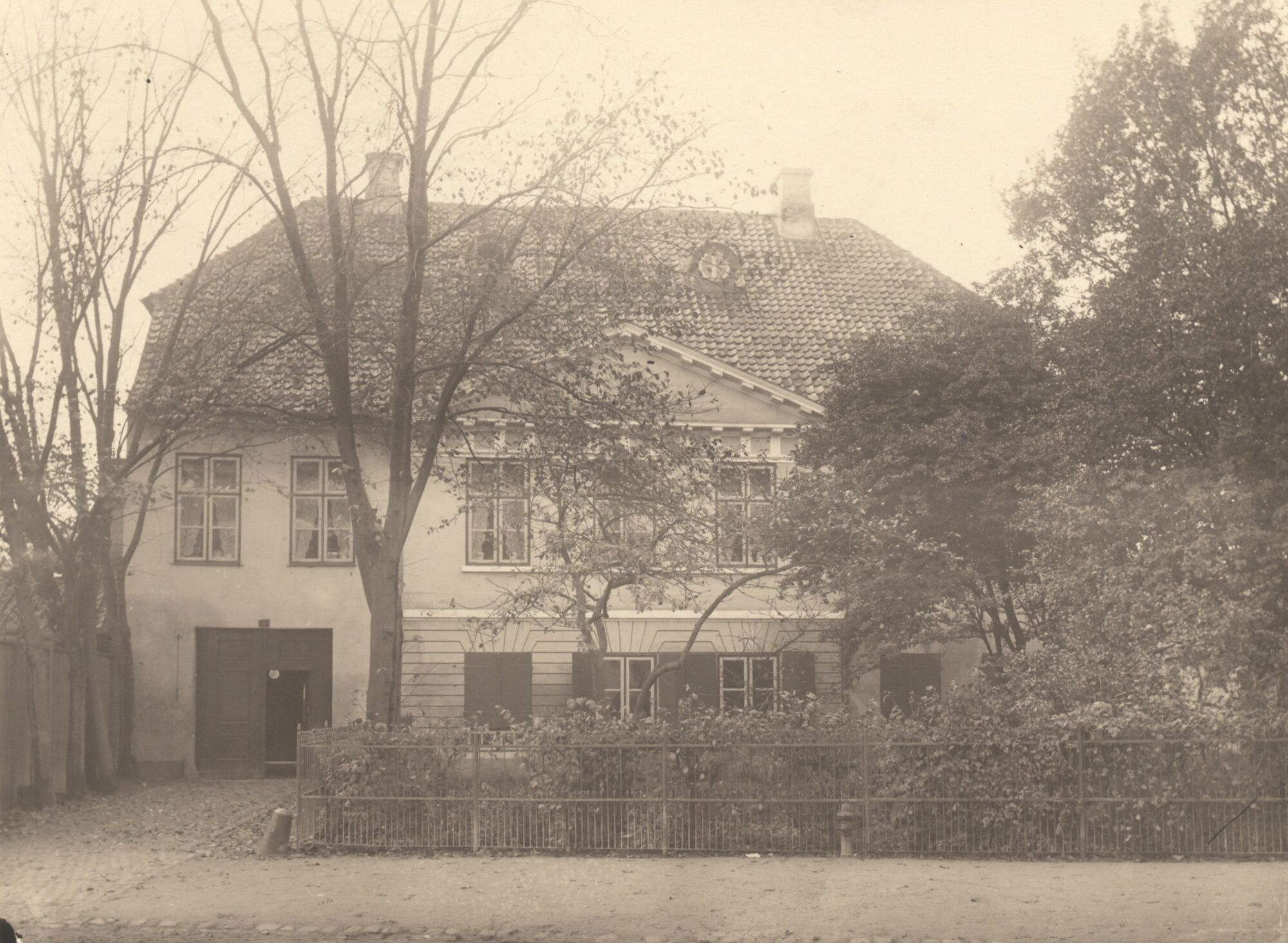
The building viewed from the street in 1890.

Boye Junge's County House is a seven-bay-wide, two storey building. The facade features a three-bay median risalit topped by a triangular pediment. The ground -floor of the median risalit is finished with shadow joints

A carriage arch passed through the eastern (left-hand-side) part of the building. A flight of. It provided access to the courtyard, to the rear of the building. The courtyard was surrounded by a half-timbered rear wing and two lateral wings. A flight of stairs in the eastern wall of the carriage arch provided access to the main building's beletage. The carriage arch was removed when the building was adapted in 1899–1900, leading to substantial changes in the building's floor plan. A new staircase topped by a Mansard roof was attached to the western gable of the building. This extension was removed in 1950.

The facade of the now demolished dormitory building was a two-storey building. The transition to the roof was accented by a Lombard band. The roof featured two steep, triangular wall dormers.

== Today ==
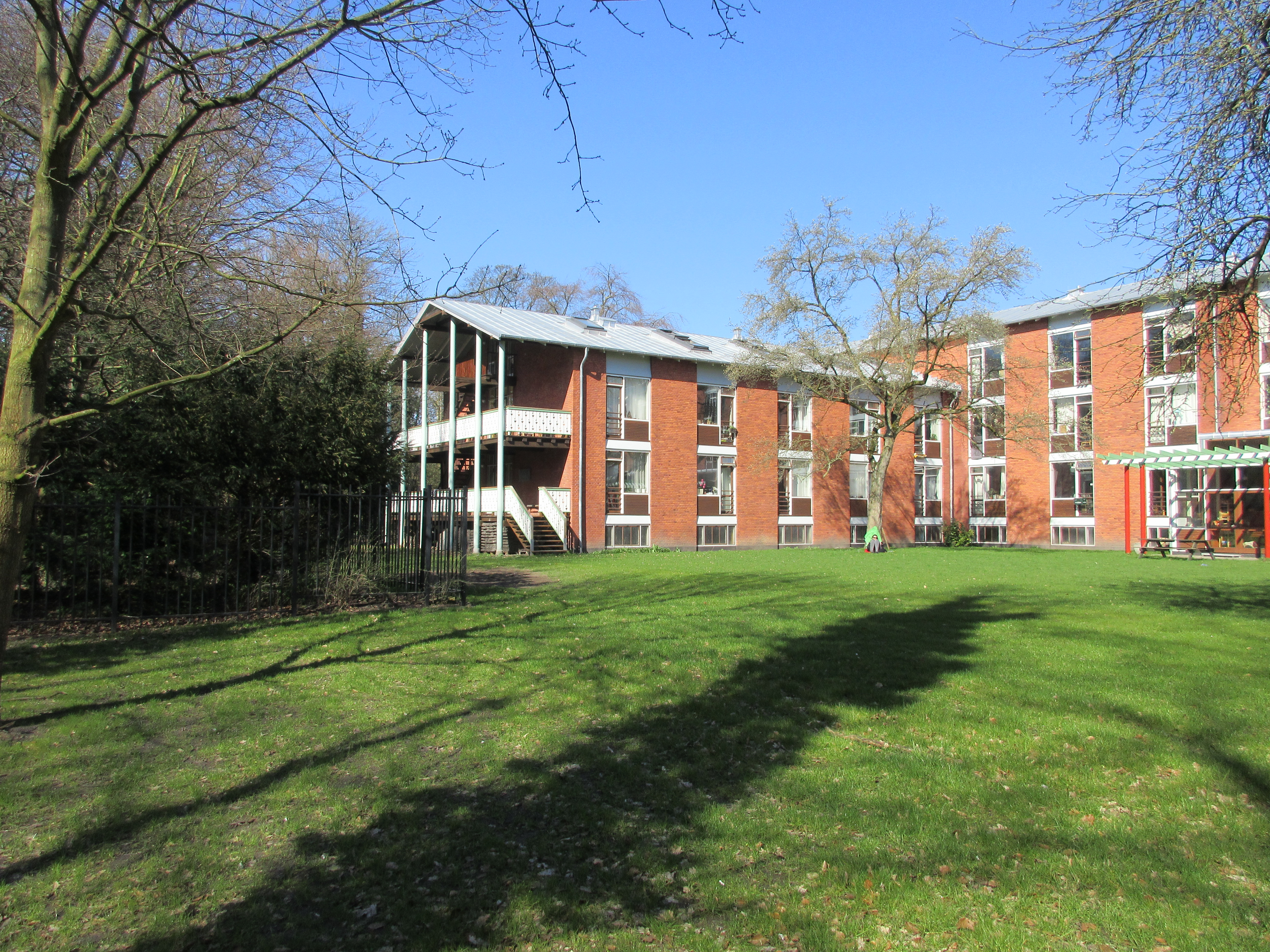
Hassagers Collegium and 4. maj Kollegiet, January 2006

The kollegium has an Ephorus Colegii who, in return for doing the administrative duties such as admitting new students and managing the economy of the dormitory, lives for free in the nearby old townhouse where Dorthea Hassager originally lived. The current ephorus is John Edelsgaard Andersen, PhD who is also the director of the International Office of the University of Copenhagen. Only a person who works at the university may become ephorus. The title ephorus is derived from the Greek ephoros which has been vulgarized into Latin.

The dormitory also has a janitor who takes care of the more practical aspects of managing the dorm. After the Second World War (in 1950) Hassagers Kollegium became integrated into the newly built 4. maj kollegiet (The 4th of May Dormitory). The old dormitory was torn down, and Hassagers Kollegium now shares building and ephorus with the new dormitory. The traditions of Hassagers Collegium live on, and application for the two dormitories remains separate (4. maj kollegiet is for children and grandchildren of the Danish freedom fighters during the War).
