= Holstebro Municipality =

Holstebro Municipality Holstebro Kommune (Danish)
- Municipality
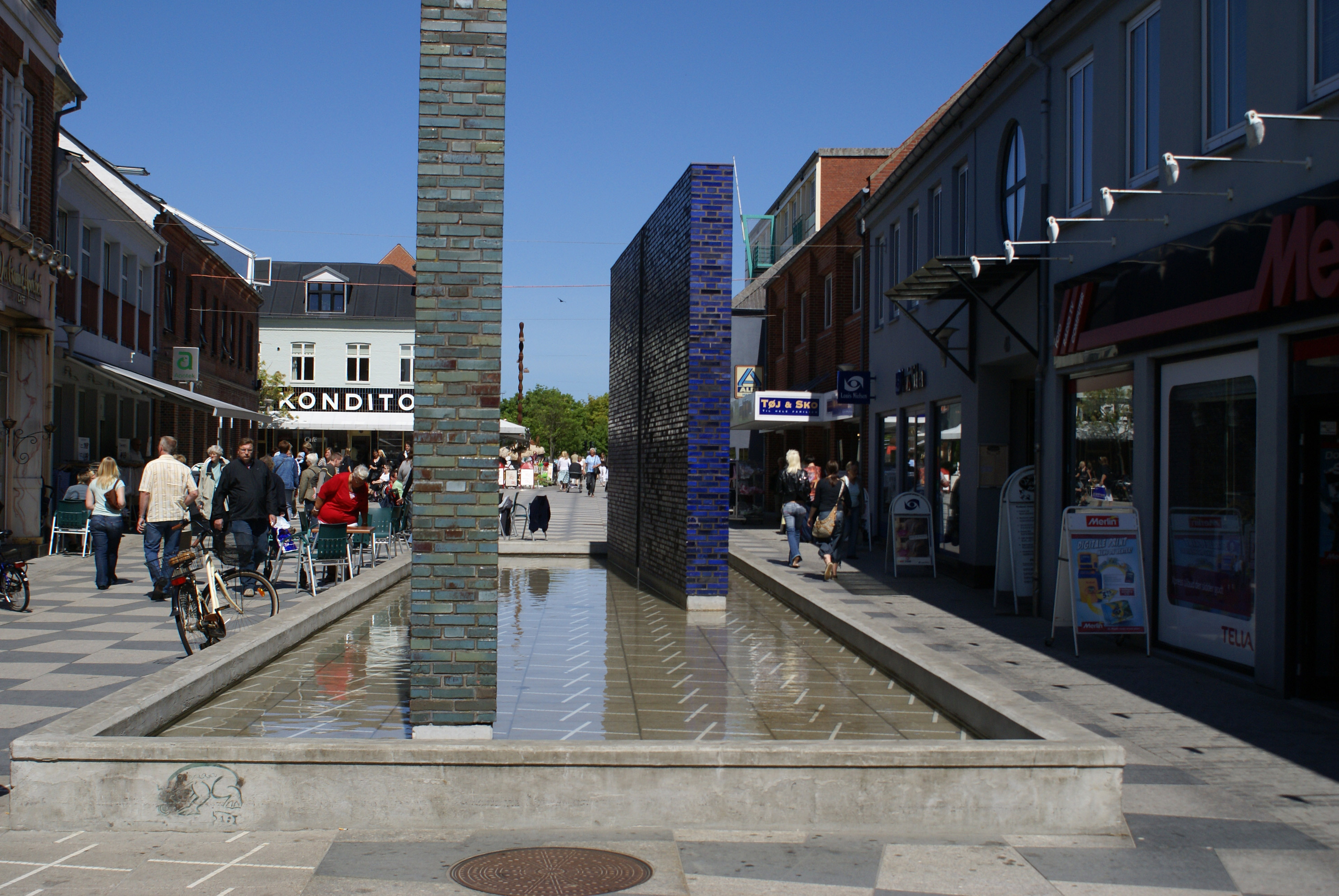

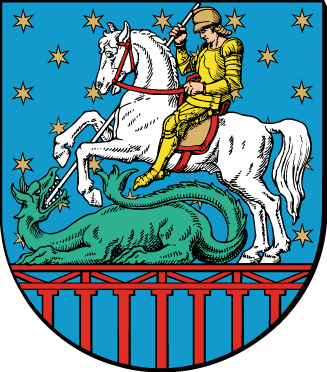
- Coat of arms

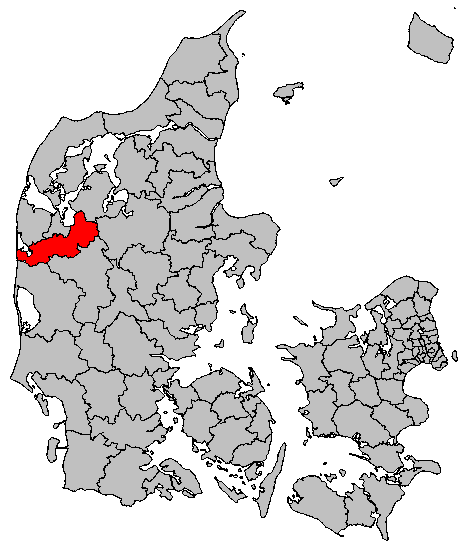
- Holstebro [left edge] is north of Herning and west of Viborg, on Denmark's Jutland peninsula
- Coordinates: 56°22′N 8°37′E
- Country: Denmark
- Region: Midtjylland

Government
  - Mayor: Kenneth Tønning (V)

Area
  - Total: 801.55 km^{2} (309.48 sq mi)

Population (1 January 2026)
  - Total: 59,324
  - Density: 74.012/km^{2} (191.69/sq mi)
- Time zone: UTC+1 (CET)
  - Summer (DST): UTC+2 (CEST)
- Website: www.holstebro.dk

Holstebro Municipality (Danish: Holstebro Kommune) is a municipality (Danish, kommune) in Region Midtjylland on the Jutland peninsula in west Denmark. The municipality covers an area of 801.55 km^{2} (309.48 sq mi), and has a population of 59,324 (1 January 2026). Its mayor is Kenneth Tønning, a member of the conservative liberal Venstre party.

The main town and the site of its municipal council is the town of Holstebro.

On 1 January 2007 Holstebro municipality was, due to Kommunalreformen ("The Municipal Reform" of 2007), merged with existing Ulfborg-Vemb and Vinderup municipalities to form the new Holstebro municipality.

Holstebro is also known for its infamous architecture style, and its architecture's correlation to World War 2.

== Locations ==
| Holstebro | 37,000 |
| Vinderup | 3,100 |
| Ulfborg | 2,000 |
| Tvis | 1,300 |
| Vemb | 1,300 |
| Nørre Felding | 730 |
| Skave | 500 |
| Sevel | 480 |
| Borbjerg | 450 |

=== The town of Holstebro ===
The town of Holstebro, has a population of 34,241 (2011). It is situated on both sides of Storåen ("The Large Creek"). Holstebro is a member of the Douzelage twinning ring of towns.

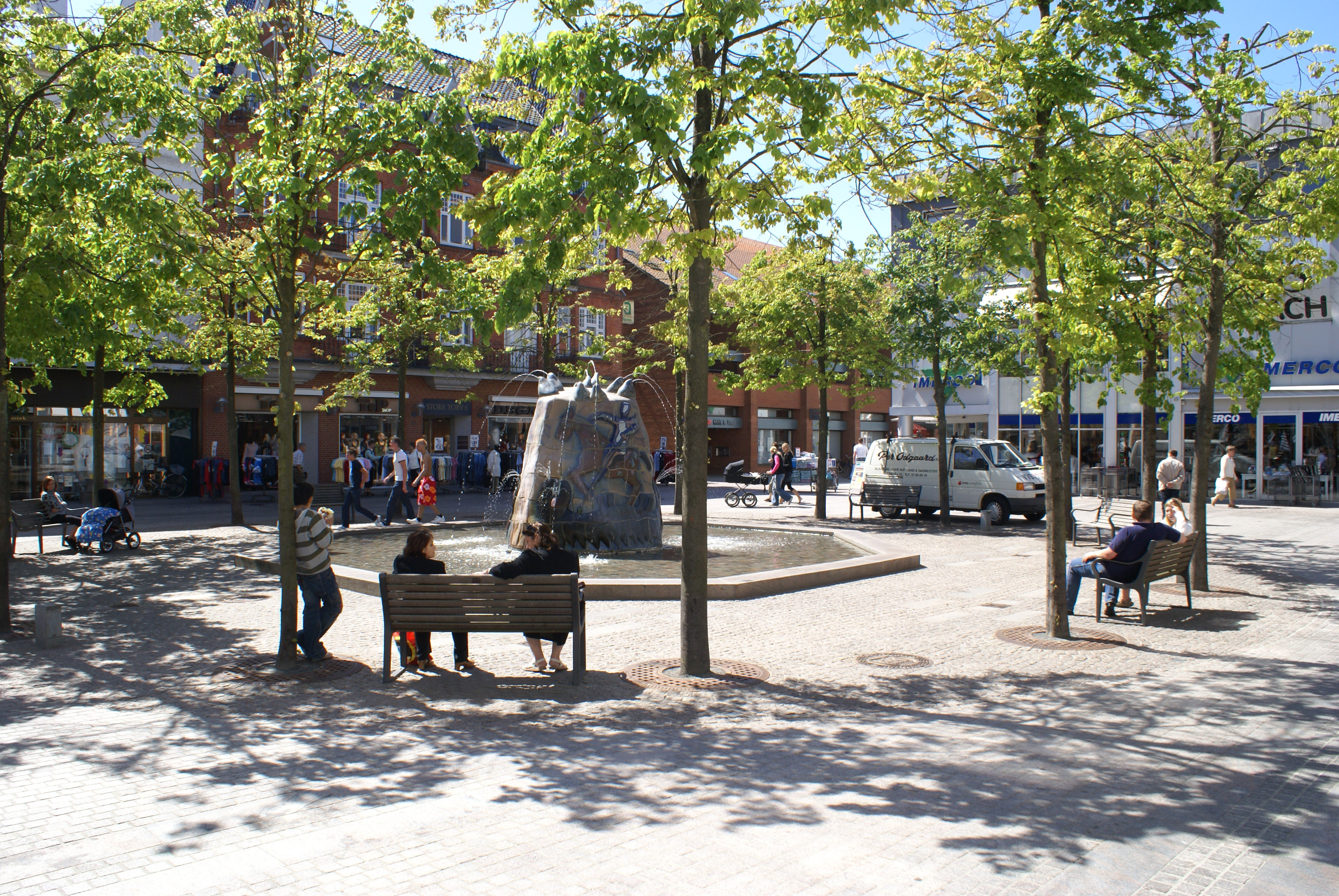
Square at the pedestrianized high street (Danish: gågade) in central Holstebro.

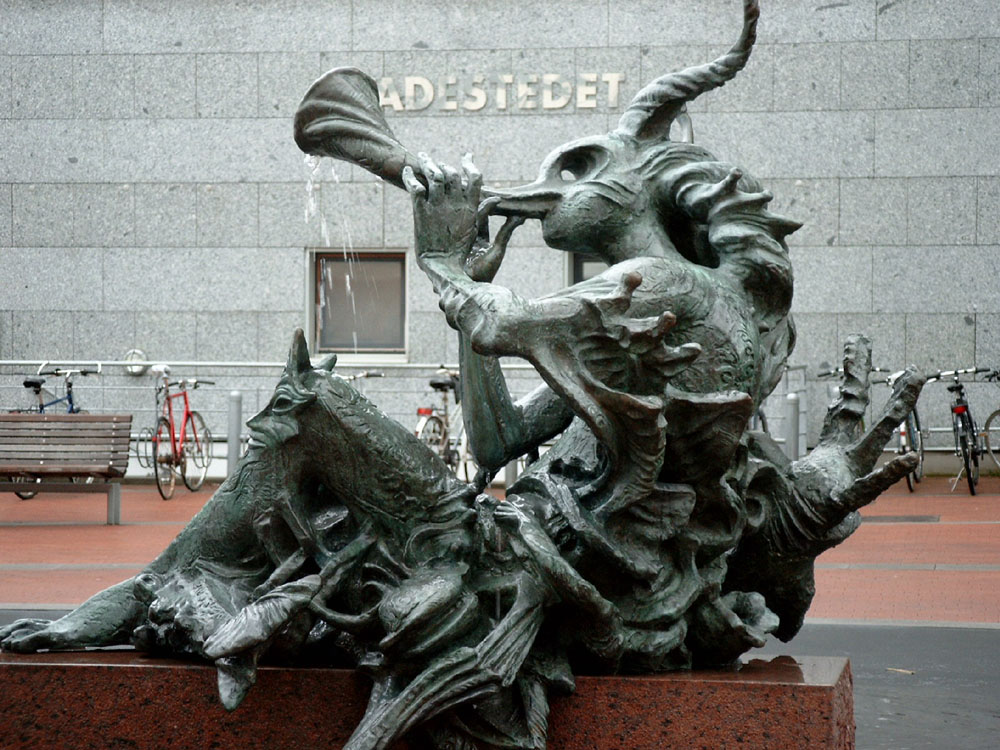
Sculpture in central Holstebro by Vadestedet.

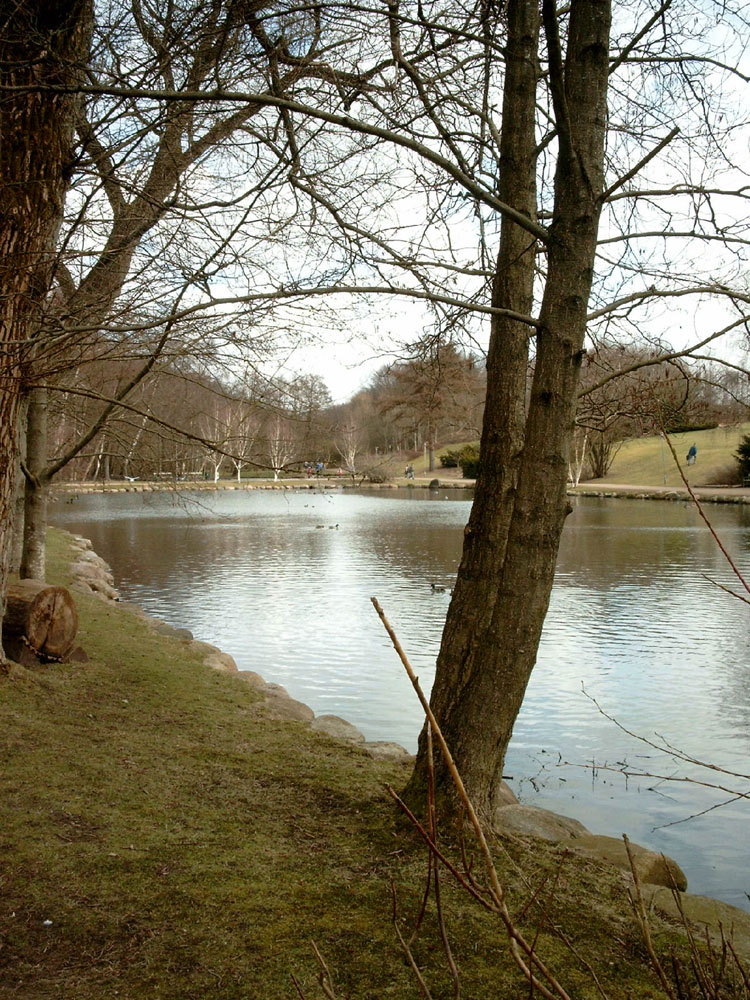
Park in central Holstebro.

== Politics ==
=== Municipal council ===
Holstebro's municipal council consists of 27 members, elected every four years.

Below are the municipal councils elected since the Municipal Reform of 2007.

| Election | Party | | | | | | | | | Total seats | Turnout | Elected mayor |
|---|---|---|---|---|---|---|---|---|---|---|---|---|
| Election | A | B | C | F | I | K | O | V | Æ | Total seats | Turnout | Elected mayor |
| 2005 | 8 | 3 | 1 | 2 | | 1 | 1 | 11 | | 27 | 70.5% | Arne Lægaard (V) |
| 2009 | 8 | 2 | 3 | 3 | | | 3 | 8 | | 27 | 75.5% | H. C. Østerby (A) |
| 2013 | 13 | 1 | | 1 | | | 2 | 10 | | 27 | 78.5% | H. C. Østerby (A) |
| 2017 | 12 | 2 | 1 | 1 | | | 2 | 9 | | 27 | 75.8% | H. C. Østerby (A) |
| 2021 | 11 | 2 | 2 | 2 | | | 1 | 9 | | 27 | 71.9% | H. C. Østerby (A) |
| 2025 | 5 | 4 | 1 | 4 | 1 | | 2 | 8 | 2 | 27 | 72.5% | Kenneth Tønning (V) |
Data from Kmdvalg.dk 2005, 2009, 2013, 2017 and 2021. Data from valg.dk 2025

== Notable people ==
- Helge Nissen (1871–1926), operatic bass-baritone, conductor and film actor
- Eugenio Barba (born 1936) founder of the Odin Teatret and International School of Theatre Anthropology

== Twin towns – sister cities ==
Holstebro is a member of the Douzelage, a town twinning association of towns across the European Union.

- Agros, Cyprus
- Altea, Spain
- Asikkala, Finland
- Bad Kötzting, Germany
- Bellagio, Italy
- (Republic of Ireland) Bundoran, Ireland
- Chojna, Poland
- Granville, France
- Houffalize, Belgium
- Judenburg, Austria
- Kőszeg, Hungary
- Marsaskala, Malta
- Meerssen, Netherlands
- Niederanven, Luxembourg
- Oxelösund, Sweden
- Preveza, Greece
- Rokiškis, Lithuania
- Rovinj, Croatia
- Sesimbra, Portugal
- Sherborne, England, United Kingdom
- Sigulda, Latvia
- Siret, Romania
- Škofja Loka, Slovenia
- Sušice, Czech Republic
- Tryavna, Bulgaria
- Türi, Estonia
- Zvolen, Slovakia

Holstebro also has one other twin town:

- Brașov, Romania
