= Renato Pengo =

Italian painter

Renato Pengo (born 1943) is an Italian artist and painter, active since 1966 in the artistic languages of painting, photography, video, installations and performances.

== Biography ==
Pengo was born in Padua. After his academic formation at the Arts Institute at Padua, where he mastered the different artistic techniques and disciplines, in 1969, during his first personal exhibition, the renowned Italian poet and writer Diego Valeri introduced him to the art gallery "Traghetto" in Venice. Two other important personal exhibitions of this period are at the gallery "Il Giorno" in Milan and at the gallery "La Chiocciola" in Padua.

During the first half of the 1970s, Pengo's work departed from his academic formation and the existentialistic expressiveness and reached new ways of experimentation. Rigorously cerebral serial structures led to the almost true essence of colour and to the obsessive recording of the distinct characters of an alienated and programmed society. In the wake of this new awareness, Pengo started experimenting with new art languages: performances, happenings, use of the photographic medium and industrial materials. Focused more on the authenticity of the artistic experience, on its effectiveness method that to the acknowledgments of the market, he participated in these years in two national exhibitions: in 1975 at the X Quadriennale in Rome and in 1976 at the annual exhibition of the Bevilacqua La Masa Foundation in Venice. In 1970 Pengo earned the first prize at the "Tenth Triveneta of the Joung Artists". In 1975 he was among the founders of the artistic group Azionecritica, whose artistic activities, such as performances and murales, are carried out in many neighborhoods in Padua, together with the Odin Teatret of Eugenio Barba. In the meantime photography became fundamental for Pengo, both as an experience for conceptual analysis and as a new way of pictorial interaction carried out by manipulating the photographic films. During this period Pengo's most important exhibitions were in Salzburg (Romanischer Keller Gallery), Villach (An Der Stadtmauer), Rovigo (Accademia dei Concordi), Prato (International Exhibition of New Tendencies), Padova (Stevens Gallery, "Matrici e immagini"); Pengo also taught photography during this period.

During the first years of the 1980s, Pengo explored new journeys, interior alphabets that render his research even more complex. Two great pictorial cycles belong to this period: "Itinerari dipinti dal tempo" and "Future archeologie", exhibited in Ferrara at the Palazzo Massari, Amsterdam (Italian Institute of Culture), The Hague (Gallery Van Voorst Van Beest) and in Padua at the Stevens Gallery and at the Civic Gallery. During the same years, Pengo produced a number of videos based on the deceleration of the image, which are presented in many national and international exhibitions such as: Catodica (Rome), Ifduif (Lugano), Le arti del cinema (Verona), Festival Mondial do Minuto in São Paulo (Brazil) and at the FilmFestival in Turin (Italy). The strenuously self-reflective character and the strictly contemporary themes of Pengo's artistic research put him in a particular position in the Italian and European contemporary art landscape.

At the beginning of the 1990s Pengo's interest turned to anthropology and psychoanalysis. During this period Pengo participated in the many conventions as "Mind´s Cosmogonies" (Padua, 1996) by Luigi Pavan and Gian Piero Brunetta; "L'énigme du visible" (Paris, 1998) by Vanessa Delouya. The "Technological shock", Pengo's original intuition that opened up a new dimension of knowledge, belongs to this period. The "Technological shock", according to the famous French art critic Pierre Restany, is the expression of a poetry that evolves in the spiritual and imaginary universe, pregnant with vibrations and cosmic energy in a space that becomes the immaterial void. The most significant exhibitions during these years were in Madrid, Tunis, Paris and New York. Towards the end of the 1990s, his work was enriched by new materials such as plexiglas, slate and iron, while the predominant colors were the rose red and the cobalt blue. In 1999 in the Palazzo del Monte di Pieta´ in Padua an important exhibitions took place : "Percezioni mutanti" (catalog by Electa).

In 2000 Pengo created a video manifesto that gave birth to a pre-linguistic and non-readable writing, consisting of figurative signs and fugitive words. Two important cycles belong to this period : "Oltre il Titolo" and "Maree", exhibited in Padua (the Dante Vecchiato Gallery), Florence (Palazzo Vecchio), Arezzo (Sala dei Grandi) and Ancona (Mole Vanvitelliana). In 2002 an important work by Pengo was acquired by the Museo d'arte dello Splendore in Giulianova. In 2004 a multimedia installation was displayed in the house of Piero della Francesca at Sansepolcro. During 2008 the following exhibitions took place : "Traghettare il tempo" at the National Museums at Villa Pisani (Stra), "Oltre" at the Net Center in Padua and "Oltre l'immagine" at the Civic Museum at Piazza del Santo in Padua.
