= Tvis, Denmark =

Town in Denmark

Tvis
- Town
- Location in Denmark Tvis (Central Denmark Region)
- Coordinates: 56°19′15″N 8°42′32″E
- Country: Denmark
- Region: Central Denmark (Midtjylland)
- Municipality: Holstebro Municipality

Area
  - Urban: 1.1 km^{2} (0.42 sq mi)

Population (2026)
  - Urban: 1,380
  - Urban density: 1,300/km^{2} (3,200/sq mi)
- Time zone: UTC+1 (CET)
  - Summer (DST): UTC+2 (CEST)
- Postal code: DK-7500 Holstebro

Tvis is a small town, with a population of 1,380 (1 January 2026), in Holstebro Municipality, Central Denmark Region in Denmark. It is located 7 km southeast of Holstebro.

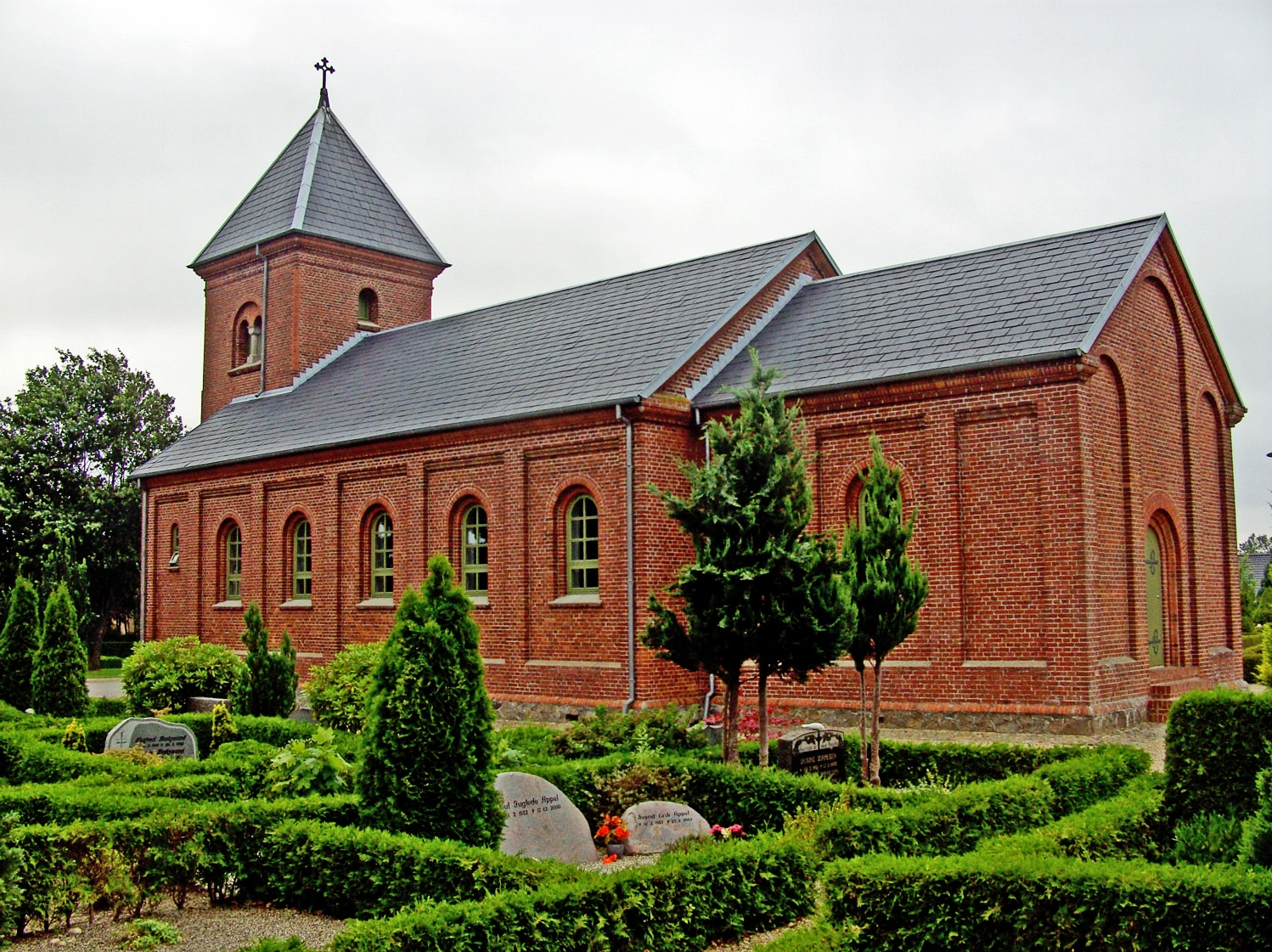
Tvis Church

Tvis Church is located in the town.

The furniture developer and manufacturer Actona Group and the kitchen manufacturer TCM Group, with one of its brands Tvis Køkkener named after the town, are headquartered in Tvis.

The local handball club Tvis KFUM has participated in the elite team Team Tvis Holstebro, that has played in the top Danish division on both the men's and women's side. The club has won the Danish Men's Handball Cup twice.
