= Vinderup railway station =

Railway station in West Jutland, Denmark

Vinderup
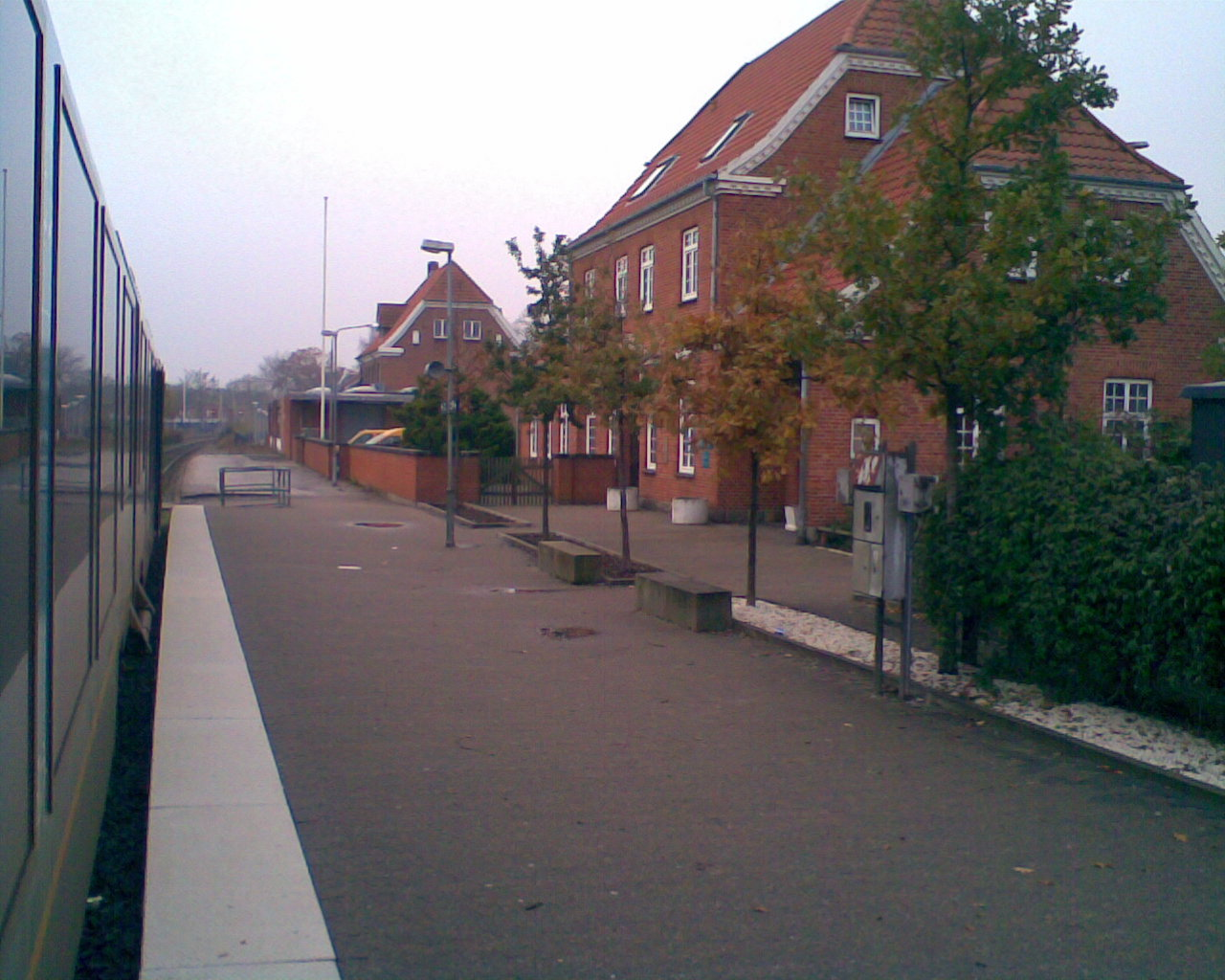
- Vinderup station in 2008

General information
- Location: Stationsvej 4C; 7830 Vinderup; Holstebro Municipality; Denmark
- Coordinates: 56°28′58″N 8°46′57″E
- Elevation: 7.8 metres (26 ft)
- Owner: Banedanmark
- Line: Langå–Struer
- Platforms: 2
- Tracks: 2
- Train operators: DSB

History
- Opened: 17 November 1865

Services
Preceding station	DSB Vores Tog	Following station
Skive towards Århus H	Aarhus–Struer Regional train	Struer Terminus
Location
- Location within Denmark Location within Central Denmark Region

Vinderup station is a railway station serving the railway town of Vinderup in Jutland, Denmark.

Vinderup station is located on the Langå–Struer railway line from Langå to Struer. The station was opened in 1865 with the opening of the Skive–Struer section of the Langå–Struer line. It offers direct regional train services to Aarhus and Struer with trains going approximately one time each hour all week days. The train services at the station are operated by the national railway company DSB..

== History ==
Vinderup station was opened on 17 November 1865 with the opening of the Skive–Struer section of the Langå–Struer railway line. In 1974, the station was closed but continues as a railway halt.

== See also ==
- List of railway stations in Denmark
- Rail transport in Denmark
