= Nissum Fjord =

Inlet in West Jutland, Denmark

Coordinates: 56°21′26.14″N 8°10′33.19″E

Designations

Ramsar Wetland
- Designated: 2 September 1977
- Reference no.: 143

Nissum Fjord is an inlet located in West Jutland, west of Vemb and is demarcated from the North Sea by a 1.3 km wide isthmus, Bøvling Klit, and passes through a lock in Thorsminde. The inlet has a water area of 70 km^{2} or 7,000 ha. but the average water depth is only about 1 meter, and the deepest areas in Felsted Kog and the center of the inlet are between 2 and 3 meters. The northern part of the inlet, called Bøvling Fjord, is so shallow that it is sometimes completely drained by strong winds. Nissum Fjord has several creeks which empty into it, such as Ramme Creek, Flynder Creek, Damhus Creek and the largest creek, Storåen, which has its mouth at the eastern corner of Felsted Kog in the southeastern end of the inlet. Since the 1870s, Thorsminde has regulated the inlet's water level and salinity content at the lock, which facilitates water exchange in the inlet. The whole inlet as well as some surrounding land is designated as a wildlife sanctuary and Ramsar wetland, and the inlet and its surrounding reeds and meadows have a rich variety of bird life.

== Fjandø ==
In the southwest part of Nissum Fjord, off of the peninsula Nørre Fjand, lies a small uninhabited island of 40 hectares called Fjandø. The island's heath vegetation is kept in check by a flock of sheep during the summer, giving good conditions for bird life. From 1 April to 31 August there is a total traffic ban on the island and in a 100-meter zone around the island.

== Felsted Kog ==
Felsted Kog is the result of a drainage project in the latter half of the 19th century. The "Kog" got its name during the time people attempted to drain the entire inlet; "kog" means "acquired land." The project succeeded only at Felsted where a 13 km long dike was constructed and approximately 1400 ha. were drained. But it was soon found that the soil was not suitable for agricultural usage, and the dike often breached under heavy storms; thus the project was abandoned in 1885.
