= Nørre Felding =

- Village
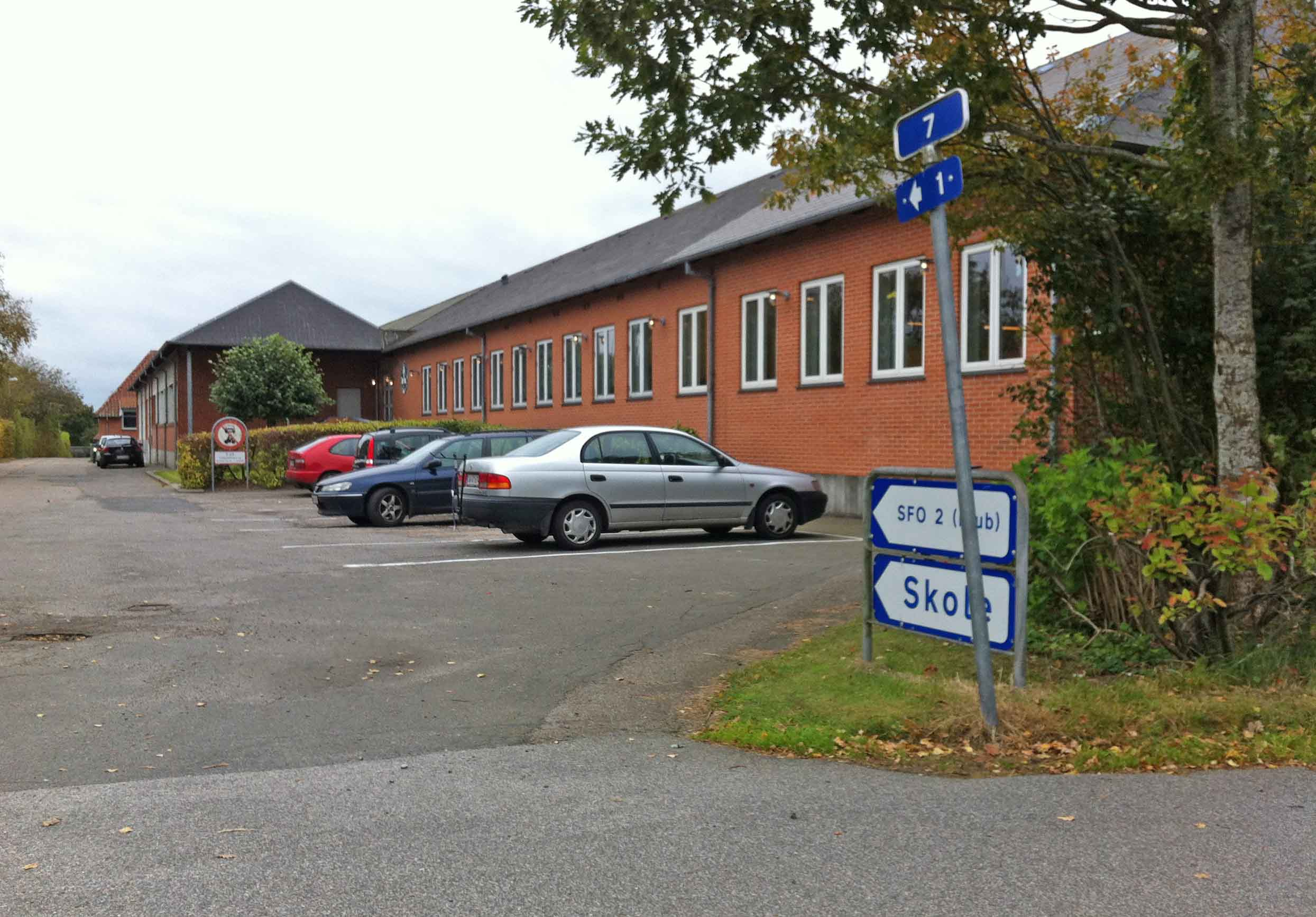
- Nørre Felding School

- Location in Central Denmark Region Nørre Felding (Denmark)
- Coordinates: 56°18′52″N 8°36′5″E
- Country: Denmark
- Region: Central Denmark (Midtjylland)
- Municipality: Holstebro Municipality

Population (2026)
  - Total: 735

Nørre Felding is a village, with a population of 735 (1 January 2026), in Holstebro Municipality, Central Denmark Region in Denmark. It is located at the Danish national road 11, 36 km northwest of Herning, 44 km northeast of Ringkøbing and 5 km south of Holstebro.

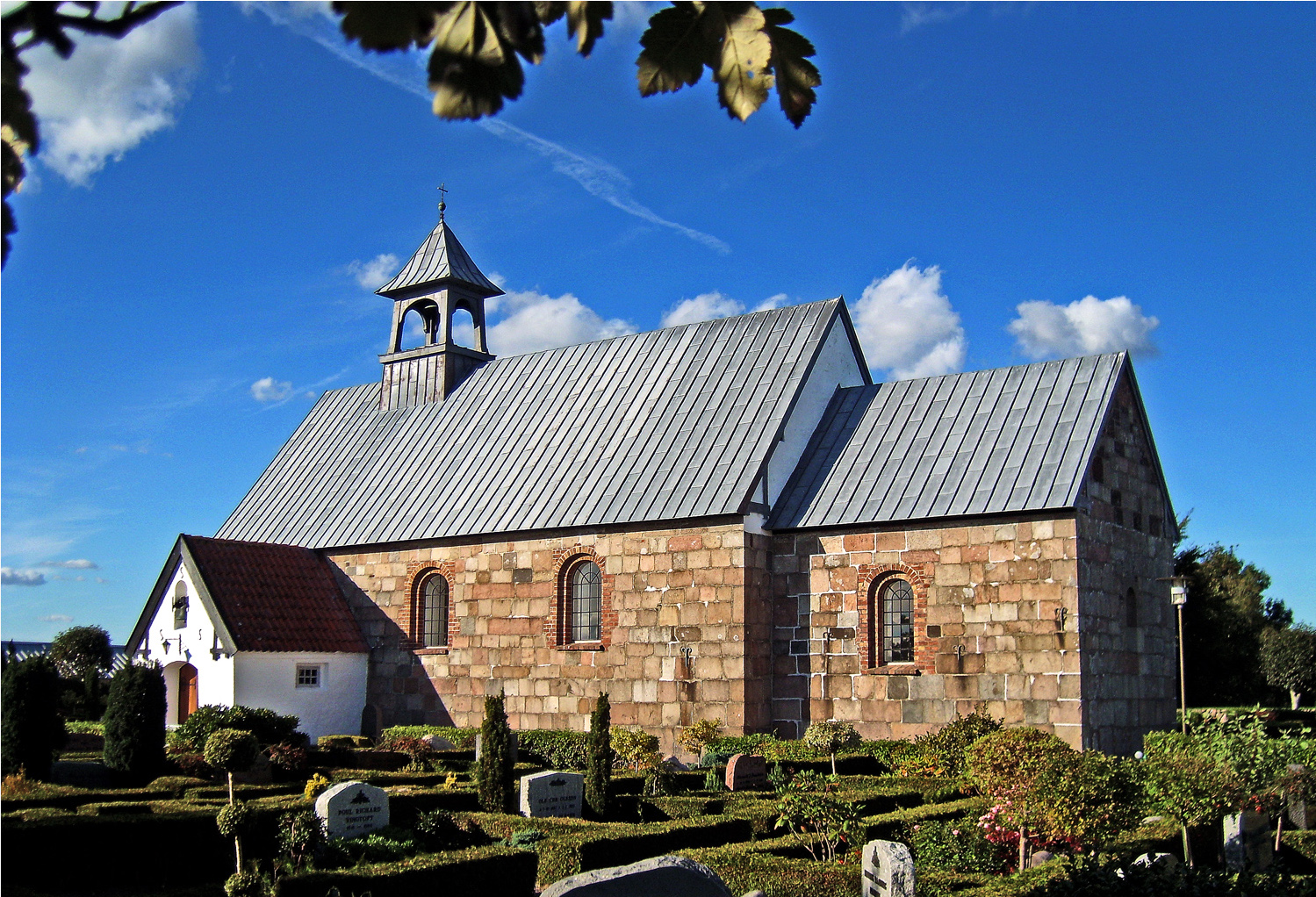
Nørre Felding Church in Nørre Felding Kirkeby

Nørre Felding Church is located in the small village of Nørre Felding Kirkeby 1.5 km east of Nørre Felding. It is a Romanesque square stone church from before 1200.
