= Dorothea Hassager =

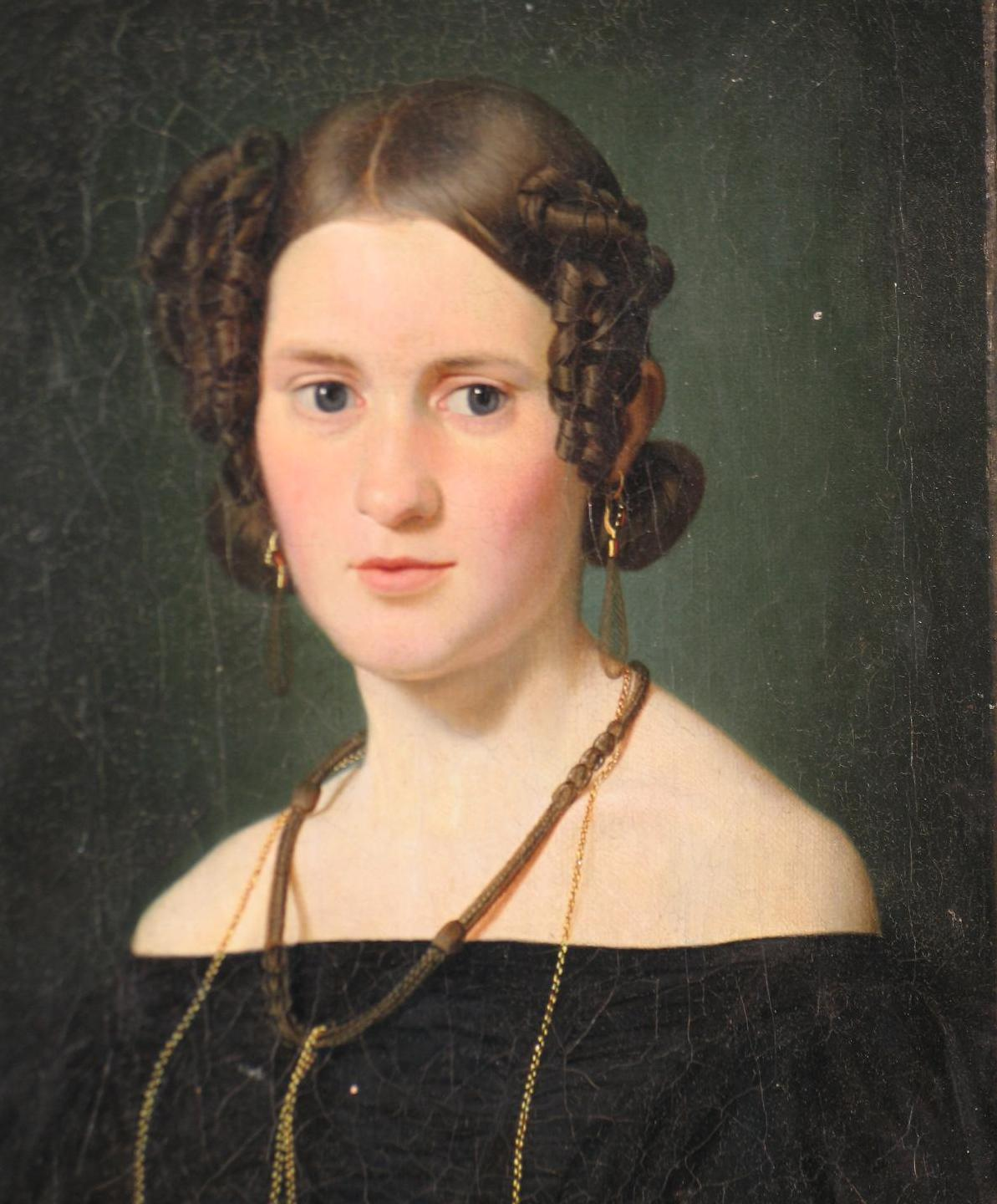
Dorthea Hassager.

Dorothea Hansine Hassager (25 September 1814 – 17 October 1897) was a Danish philanthropist and founder of Hassagers Collegium (Hassager's Dormitory) the youngest of the "old dormitories" of the University of Copenhagen.

Coming from a family of clergymen, Dorothea Hansine Hørning was married at the age of 17 to the 16 years older priest Carl Hassager, and she followed him around Denmark in the various parishes in which he preached. Though childless the couple managed to amass quite a modest fortune through the years.

They purchased a large house in the town of Frederiksberg near Copenhagen in which they planned to spend their retirement, but Carl Hassager died (8 December 1875) before they could move to the capital.

Dorothea Hassager lived as a widow in Frederiksberg for more than twenty years, where she attended lectures at the University of Copenhagen and played hostess for a steady stream of relatives and friends.

Through her Will, she had a dormitory built in her backyard and she founded a scholarship for students coming from the parishes where her husband preached. The dormitory consisted of ten rent-free single rooms for students of the University of Copenhagen who had passed at least two years of study.
