= Cathrine Fabricius-Hansen =

Professor of German Studies

Cathrine Fabricius-Hansen (born December 18, 1942) is a Danish-born Norwegian Germanist. She has been a professor of German studies at the University of Oslo; she originally taught in the Department of Germanic Studies, now part of the merged Department of Literature, Area Studies, and European Languages.

Fabricius-Hansen was born in Holstebro, Denmark. She received a master's degree in general linguistics in Copenhagen in 1969 and worked as a lecturer and research fellow at the University of Copenhagen's Department of Germanic Philology from 1969 to 1975. She joined the Department of Germanic Studies at the University of Oslo in 1975 and was made a professor in 1986. She received her doctorate in 1987.

Among other positions, she has chaired of the Department of Germanic Studies, vice-dean of the Faculty of Arts, and been a member of the university senate. She became a member of the Norwegian Academy of Science and Letters in 1993 and the Royal Norwegian Society of Sciences and Letters in 1994. She has also held a number of other national and international positions.

Fabricius-Hansen was awarded the University of Copenhagen gold medal in 1966. In 2000, she received the Fridtjof Nansen Award of Excellence, in 2002 the Jacob and Wilhelm Grimm Prize, and in 2003 the Konrad Duden Prize. She received an honorary degree from LMU Munich in 2007.

She is currently involved in revising the fourth volume of the Duden German grammar.
