= Ove Christiansen =

- Born: 13 November 1969 (age 56); Holstebro, Denmark
- Scientific career
- Fields: Chemistry (Theoretical chemistry)
- Institutions: Aarhus University
- Doctoral advisor: Poul Jørgensen

Ove Christiansen (born November 13, 1969) is professor of chemistry at the Department of Chemistry, Aarhus University (AU), Denmark. He is contributor to the DALTON program package and initiated the MidasCpp (Molecular Interactions Dynamics and Simulations in C++) program for the accurate description of nuclear dynamics with means of Coupled Cluster Theory.

== Research ==
Ove Christiansen made important contributions to electronic structure theory by introducing the CC2 and CC3 method and by establishing a hierarchy of Coupled cluster electronic structure models: CCS, CC2, CCSD, CC3, etc.. He introduced contributions to response theory for the purpose of describing electronic excited states. Later he changed the emphasis of his main research interest towards vibrational structure theory and defined a variant of vibrational Coupled cluster (VCC) and developed the theoretical machinery for automatic derivation and implementation of VCC. Moreover, he defined vibrational response theory for various wave function types. All these progress is assembled in the publicly available MidasCpp program suite .

== Academic career ==
Ove Christiansen received his PhD in Theoretical Chemistry under the supervision of Prof. Poul Jørgensen at Aarhus University Denmark in 1997. Afterwards he joined from 1997 to 1999 as Alexander von Humboldt fellow the group of Prof. Jürgen Gauß in Mainz Germany and later went to the University of Lund in Sweden, where he became a Docent in 2000. In 2002 he returned to Aarhus University as associate professor, became Professor MSO (Professor with special obligations) in 2013 and was promoted to a full Professor in 2018.

== Awards ==
- 2013: EliteForsk award
- 2006: EURYI Award
