= Holstebro RK =

- Full name: Holstebro RK
- Nickname: Vikingerne (Vikings)
- Founded: 1980
- Location: Holstebro, Denmark
- Chairman: Rudi Kvisgaard
- Coach(es): Kristian Riberholdt Andersen; Christian Bisgaard Nielsen (both player-coaches)
- Captain: Kristian Riberholdt Andersen
Team kit

Holstebro RK is a Danish rugby club in Holstebro.

== History ==
The club was founded in 1980.
