= Elias Ehlers =

Danish stand-up comedian

Elias Ehlers (born 15 December 1985) is a Danish stand-up comedian.

He was the winner of DM in stand-up 2006, TV2 Zulu Comedy Fight Club in 2007, and he has repeatedly appeared in Stand-up.dk and Comedy Aid. His acts often consist of self-irony, flashbacks to his childhood and political considerations.
