= Eugenio Barba =

Italian theatre director

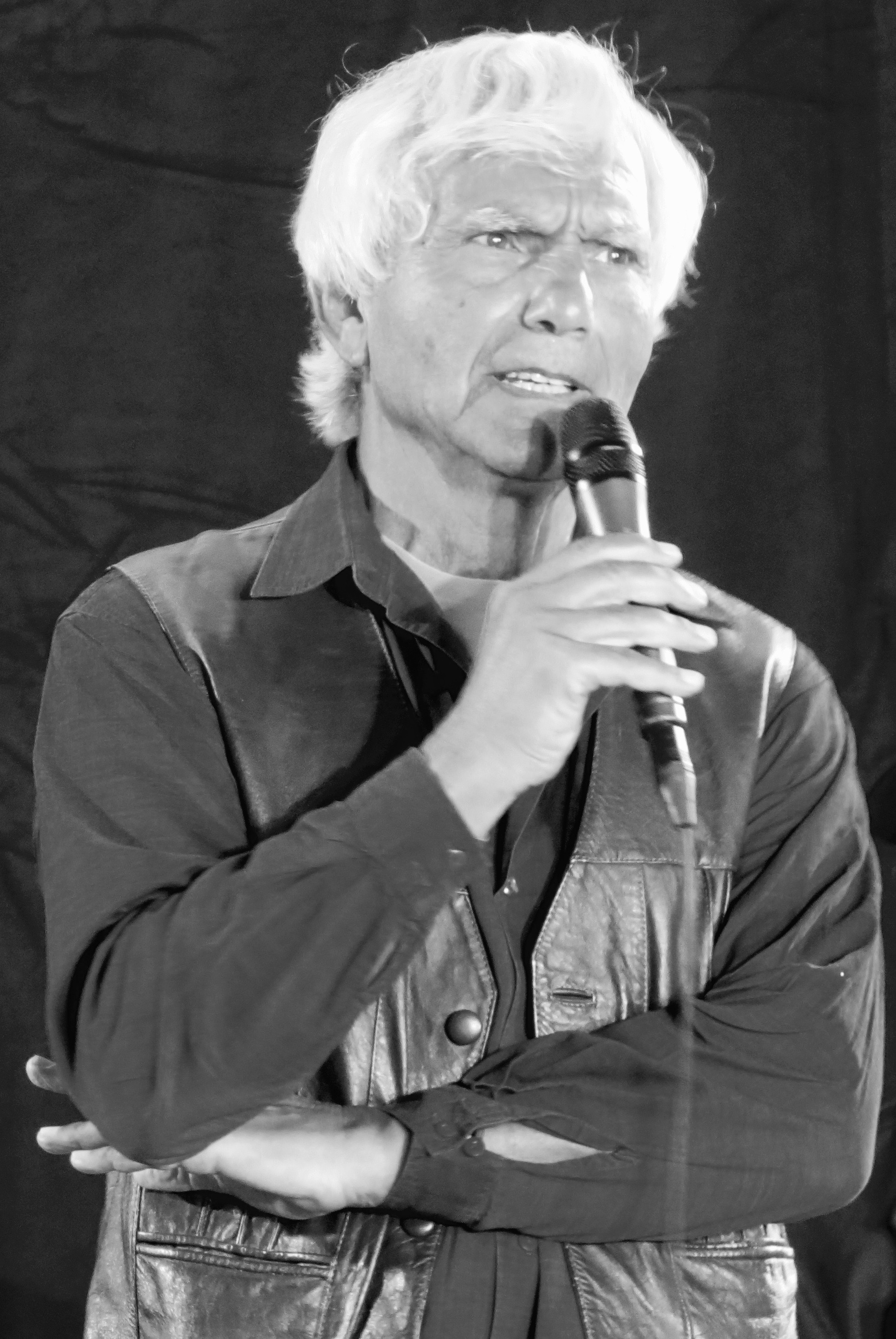
Eugenio Barba in 2015

Eugenio Barba (born 29 October 1936) is an Italian author and theatre director based in Denmark. He is the founder of the Odin Theatre and the International School of Theatre Anthropology, both located in Holstebro, Denmark.

== Biography ==
Barba was born in Brindisi and grew up in Gallipoli, Lecce Province, Italy. After leaving the Nunziatella military academy of Naples in 1954, he emigrated to Norway to work as a welder and sailor. He also took degrees in French, Norwegian literature, and history of religion at Oslo University. In 1961 he went to Warsaw in Poland to study theatre direction at the State Theatre School, but left one year later to join Jerzy Grotowski, who at that time was the leader of Teatr 13 Rzedow in Opole. Barba stayed with Grotowski for three years.

In 1963 he traveled to India where he had his first encounter with Kathakali. He wrote an essay on the form which was published in Italy, France, the U. S. and Denmark. His first book, In Search of a Lost Theatre, was published in Italy and Hungary in 1965.

When Barba returned to Oslo in 1964, he wanted to become a professional theatre director, but as a foreigner he faced opposition. He and Norwegian author Jens Bjørneboe gathered a group of people who had not passed their admission test to Oslo's State Theatre School and created the Odin Teatret on 1 October 1964. The group trained and rehearsed in an air raid shelter. Their first production, Ornitofilene, by Bjørneboe, was performed in Norway, Sweden, Finland and Denmark. They were subsequently offered an old farm and a small sum of money by the Danish municipality of Holstebro, which became their base.

Over forty-two years, Barba has directed sixty-five productions for the Odin Teatret and the Theatrum Mundi Ensemble. Some of the more recent productions are Salt (2002), Great Cities Under the Moon (2003), Andersen's Dream (2005), Ur-Hamlet (2006) and Don Giovanni all'Inferno (2006) in collaboration with Ensemble Midtvest.

In 1979 Barba founded the International School of Theatre Anthropology (ISTA). He is on the advisory boards of scholarly journals such as The Drama Review, Performance Research, New Theatre Quarterly, Teatro e Storia and Teatrología. Among his most recent publications, translated into several different languages, are The Paper Canoe (Routledge), Theatre: Solitude, Craft, Revolt (Black Mountain Press), Land of Ashes and Diamonds: My Apprenticeship in Poland, 26 letters from Jerzy Grotowski to Barba (Black Mountain Press) and, in collaboration with Nicola Savarese, The Secret Art of the Performer and the revised and updated version of A Dictionary of Theatre Anthropology (Centre for Performance Research/Routledge). In 2021 he has founded the open-access Journal of Theatre Anthropology.
