= International School of Theatre Anthropology =

Coordinates: 56°22′47″N 8°36′26″E

The International School of Theatre Anthropology (ISTA) is an international and multi-cultural network of performers, directors, scholars and academics of the theatre. Based in the Odin Teatret, Denmark, the organization has the nature of an itinerant university whose central field of study and research is theatre anthropology, the multi-cultural study of acting techniques.

== History ==
Founded in 1979 by Eugenio Barba, the ISTA has functioned as a laboratory of theatre in the spirit of Grotowski theatre, though broader and more inclusive. ISTA researches the technical aspect of the performer's art by empirical methods to further the understanding of the fundamental principles which engender the performers' particular being and energy. This way of being, referred to as "presence" or "scenic life", is paradoxical. The 'daily' organic being is transmuted through often rigorous execution of techniques—which share a number of common features across a multitude of traditions—to come alive and new in the moment of performance once again, but at a higher level of energy.

The study of the common features of theatrical tradition in different cultures can facilitate the performance of the actor or actress.

== Principles ==
Considering acting techniques around the world, Barba observed that the 'extra-daily' life of the performers is the result of alterations in the performers' balance, producing the appearance of a separate, unconscious autonomy.

== Administration ==
Eugenio Barba serves as the director of ISTA. Each session of the school focuses on a different aspect or theme, which is investigated by means of workshops and classes. Lectures and demonstrations are also used, as are theatrical performances.

Before these sessions begin, the attendees are selected from applicants who have shown an interest to attend, participate, or simply observe. These applicants represent various fields and include choreographers, performers, directors, scholars and critics. The ISTA is essentially a network of contacts between interested parties with a permanent core of professors and performers from many universities in Europe, Africa, Asia and the Americas.

The work of the ISTA continues outside of the sessions in the form of research and continued contact, exchanges and initiatives among and between its members. The results of the work and study are collected, interpreted and disseminated by and within the framework of the University of Eurasian Theatre.

== See also ==
- Scenic bios
