= Storå (Denmark) =

River in Denmark

Coordinates: 56°06′N 9°18′E

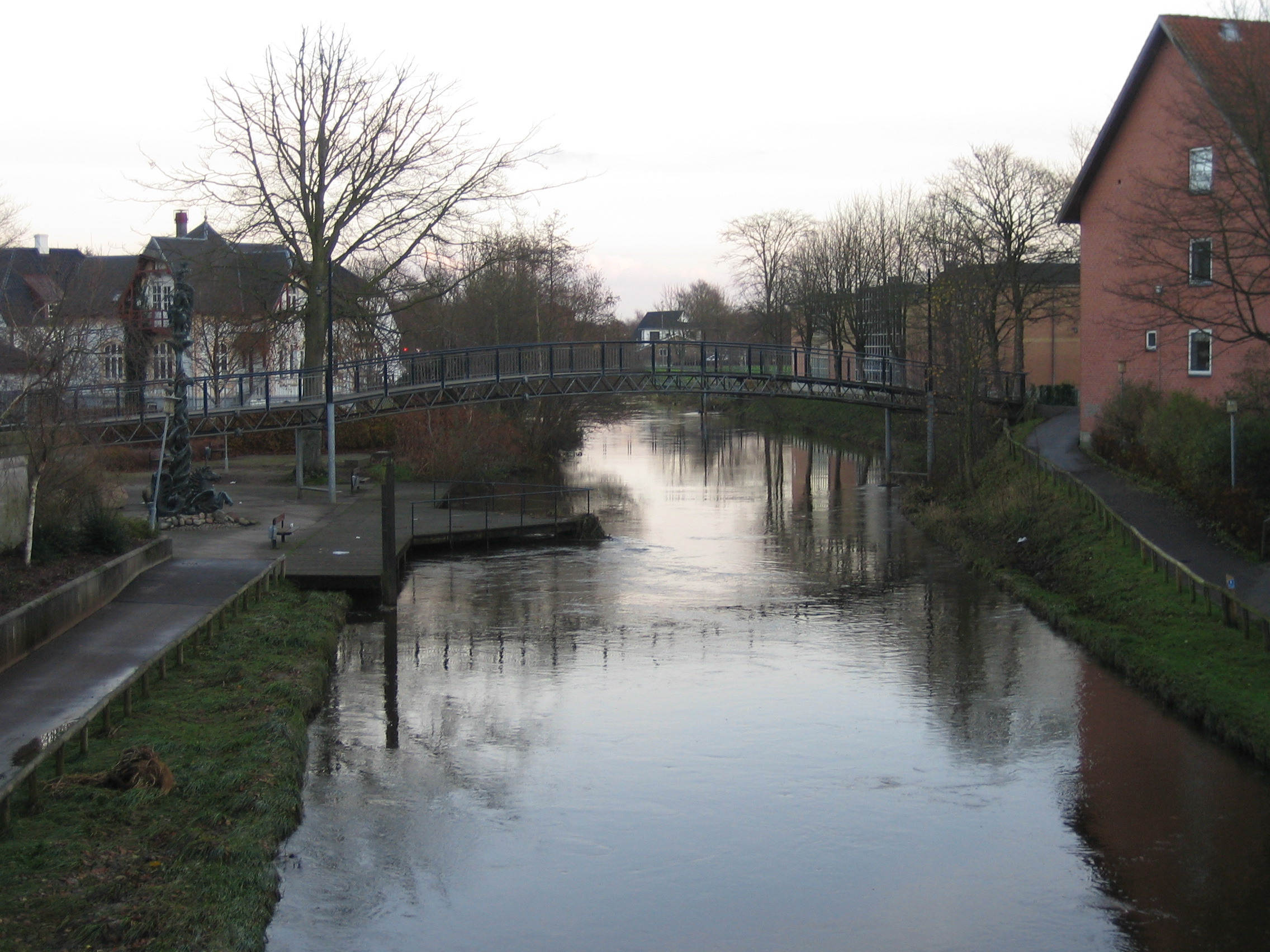
Storåen runs through Holstebro.

The Storå (lit. 'Large Creek') or Storåen is Denmark's second longest river, spanning 104 kilometres (65 mi).
