= Vinderup =

- Town
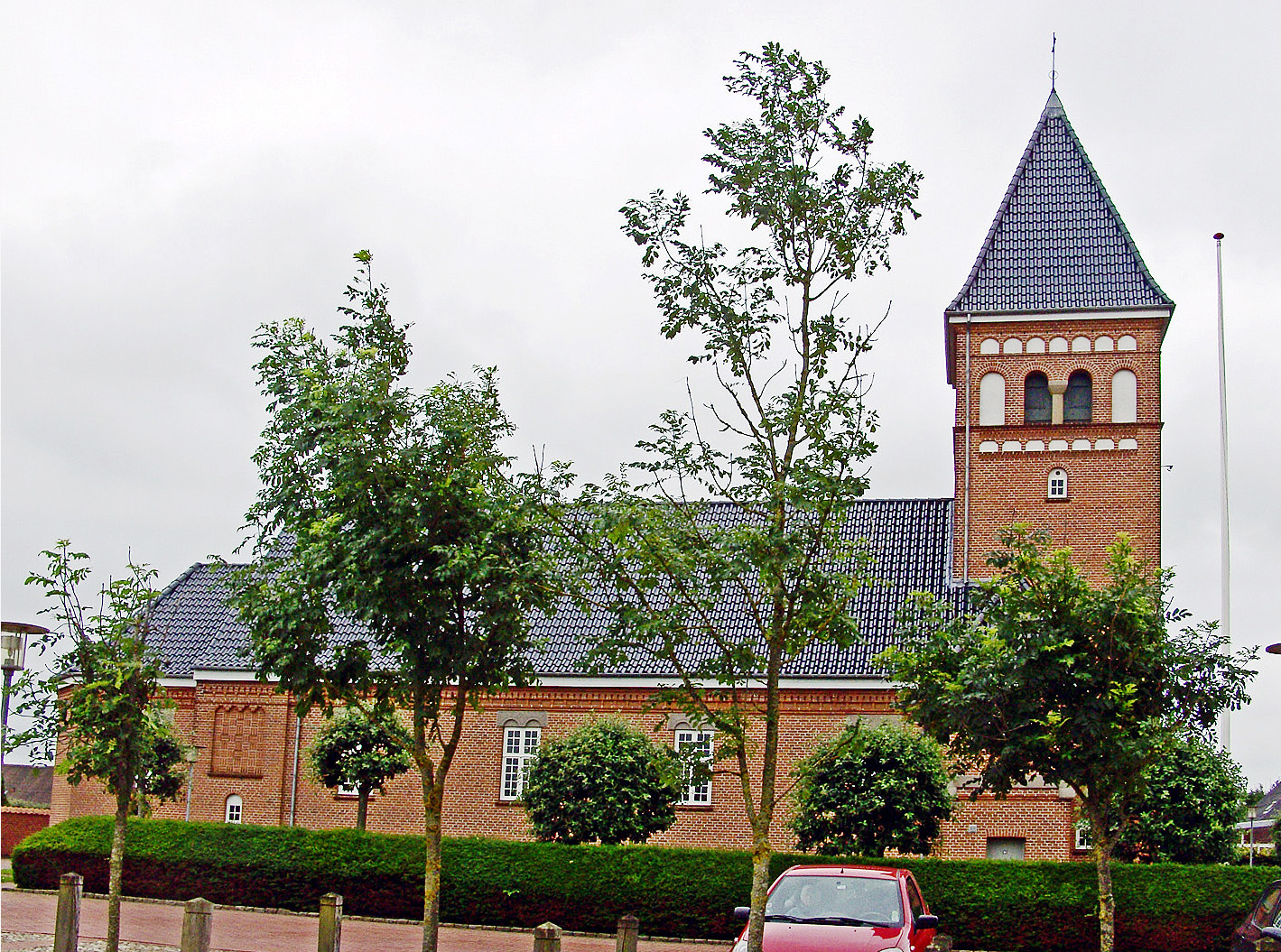
- Vinderup Church

- Location in Denmark Vinderup (Central Denmark Region)
- Coordinates: 56°28′55″N 8°46′57″E
- Country: Denmark
- Region: Region Midtjylland
- Municipality: Holstebro Municipality

Area
  - Urban: 2.32 km^{2} (0.90 sq mi)

Population (2026)
  - Urban: 3,103
  - Urban density: 1,340/km^{2} (3,460/sq mi)
  - Gender: 1,533 males and 1,570 females
- Time zone: UTC+1 (CET)
  - Summer (DST): UTC+2 (CEST)
- Postal code: DK-7830 Vinderup

Vinderup is a railway town in Northwestern Jutland, Holstebro Municipality, Denmark at the railway between Struer and Skive. Vinderup has a population of 3,103 (1 January 2026) and was the main town of the abolished Vinderup Municipality.

== Transportation ==
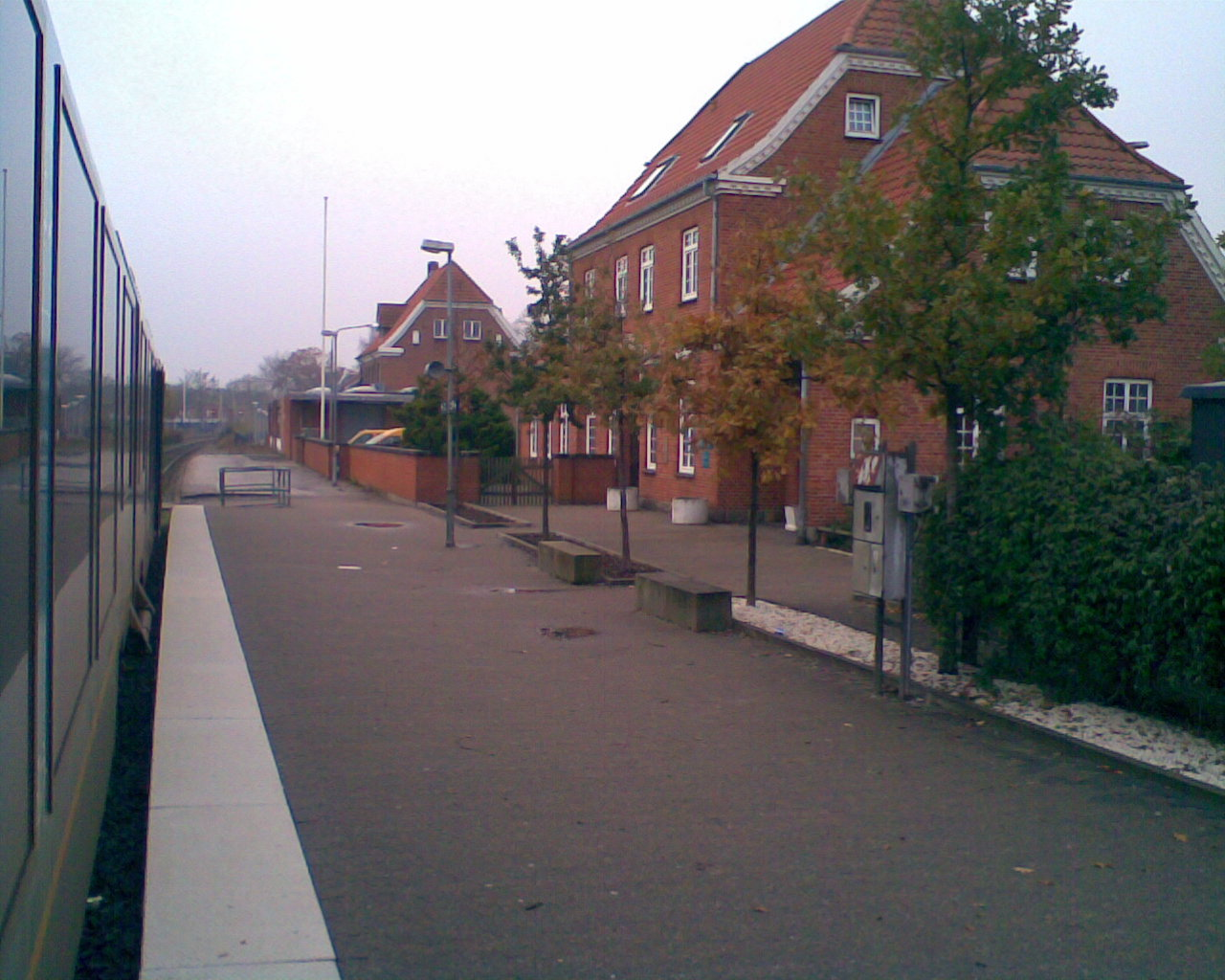
Vinderup railway station in 2008.

Vinderup is located at the Langå–Struer railway line and is served by Vinderup railway station.

== Notable people ==
- The Rosenkrantz noble family has a line called the Rydhave line (Line VII) relating to Rydhave near Vinderup in Jutland
- Laust Jevsen Moltesen (1865–1950) a Danish educated church historian; in 1909 he was elected in Vinderup to the Danish Folketing and was Foreign Minister of Denmark from 1926 to 1929.
