= Odin Teatret =

Theatre company based in Denmark

Coordinates: 56°22′47″N 8°36′26″E

Odin Teatret is an avant-garde theatre group based in Holstebro, Denmark. It was founded by Italian theatre director and investigator Eugenio Barba in 1964. From 1984 Odin Teatret was a part of NTL, Nordisk Teaterlaboratorium until December 2022, which also included the International School of Theatre Anthropology (ISTA), founded in 1979, and the Centre for Theatre Laboratory Studies (CTLS), founded in 2002

== History ==
In 1961, Italian theatre student Eugenio Barba left his studies at State Theatre School in Warsaw to join Jerzy Grotowski at Teatr 13 Rzędów in Opole. After three years with Grotowski, Barba travelled to India where he learned Kathakali, then returned to Oslo with the intention of becoming a theatre director. As a foreigner in Norway he found this was not easy, so he formed his own company, Odin Teatret, in October 1964. The company members were young people who had failed to gain admission to the Oslo State Theatre School and they rehearsed their first production in an air raid shelter.

In 1966, the Danish municipality of Holstebro invited Odin Teatret to create a theatre laboratory there, offering an old farm and a small sum of money.

In 1979, Barba founded ISTA, the International School of Theatre Anthropology as an itinerant university and multicultural network of performers and scholars whose common field of study is theatre anthropology. Since 1990, ISTA in collaboration with the University of Bologna has organised the University of Eurasian Theatre, holding conferences and encounters of a theoretical-practical character. Another ISTA activity is Theatrum Mundi, a performance montage of scenes drawn from the repertoire of the physical scores of the Asian and Odin actors.

In 1984 Nordisk Teaterlaboratorium was established as the umbrella organisation for Odin Teatret and all its activities. Since 1984, Odin Teatret has been a self-governing institution and today employs a permanent salaried staff of 18 (including actors, technicians and administrative staff).

In 1992, the Centre for Theatre Laboratory Studies (CTLS) was established at Odin Teatret in collaboration with Aarhus University. As well as documenting and archiving all of Odin Teatret's activities, CTLS is researching the contribution of contemporary and historic theatre laboratories, promoting exchange between national and international theatre networks, and initiating seminars and conferences on theatre laboratories as a creative professional and theoretical environment.

== Company ==
Founding Director Eugenio Barba continues to lead the company, and some of the original actors remain. The 2025 company included actors Antonia Cioaza, Jan Ferslev, Tage Larsen, Else Marie Laukvik, Jakob Nielsen, Rina Skeel, Ulrik Skeel and Julia Varley.

== Performances ==
Odin Teatret has created some 83 performances, of which some remain in its repertoire.

== Publications ==
Odin Teatret's publishing activities began in the 1960s with the publication of the magazine T.T.T. (Teatrets Teori og Teknikk) and Jerzy Grotowski’s book Towards a Poor Theatre, which was translated into more than fifteen languages. Today it publishes books about Odin Teatret and ISTA; videos of Odin Teatret's performances, pedagogy and training; videos of other practitioners' productions and pedagogy; music; posters; and the journal The Open Page (in association with the Magdalena Project).

== Bibliography ==
- The Floating Islands: Reflections with Odin Teatret, by Eugenio Barba, Ferdinando Taviani, published by Drama, 1979
- A Dictionary of Theatre Anthropology: The Secret Art of the Performer, by Eugenio Barba, Nicola Savarese, International School of Theatre Anthropology (Holstebro, Denmark), Richard Fowler, translated by Richard Fowler, published by Routledge, 1991, ISBN 0-415-05308-0, ISBN 978-0-415-05308-2
- Towards a Third Theatre: Eugenio Barba and the Odin Teatret, by Ian Watson, Watson Ian, Richard Schechner, published by Routledge, 1995, ISBN 0-415-12764-5, ISBN 978-0-415-12764-6
- The Paper Canoe: A Guide to Theatre Anthropology, by Eugenio Barba, Richard Fowler, translated by Richard Fowler, published by Routledge, 1995, ISBN 978-0-415-10083-0
- Land of Ashes and Diamonds: My Apprenticeship in Poland - Followed by 26 Letters from Jerzy Grotowski to Eugenio Barba, by Eugenio Barba, Jerzy Grotowski, published by Black Mountain Press, 1999, ISBN 1-902867-01-7, ISBN 978-1-902867-01-4
- Odin Teatret 2000, by John Andreasen, Annelis Kuhlmann, published by Aarhus University Press, 2000, ISBN 87-7288-872-5, ISBN 978-87-7288-872-9
- Negotiating Cultures: Eugenio Barba and the Intercultural Debate, by Ian Watson, published by Manchester University Press, 2002, ISBN 0-7190-6170-9, ISBN 978-0-7190-6170-7
- Eugenio Barba, by Jane Turner, published by Routledge, 2004, ISBN 0-415-27327-7, ISBN 978-0-415-27327-5
