= Holstebro =

- Town
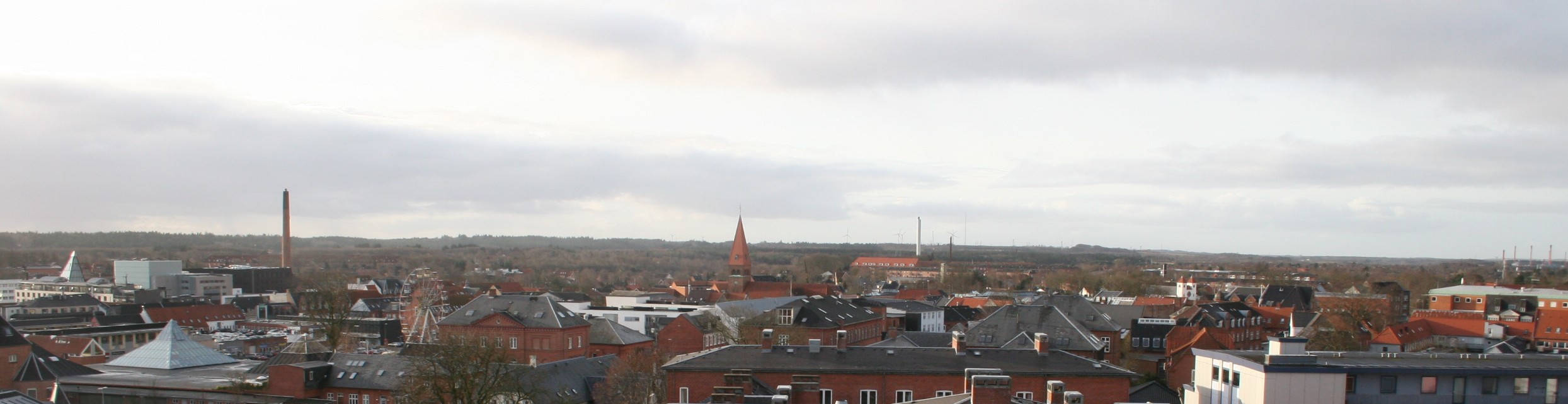
- Skyline

- Coat of arms

- Location within Denmark Location within Central Denmark Region
- Coordinates: 56°21′26″N 08°36′55″E
- Country: Denmark
- Region: Central Denmark
- Municipality: Holstebro

Government
  - Mayor: H.C. Østerby (A)

Area
  - Urban: 24.1 km^{2} (9.3 sq mi)
- Elevation: 14 m (46 ft)

Population (2026)
  - Urban: 37,533
  - Urban density: 1,560/km^{2} (4,030/sq mi)
  - Gender: 18,416 males and 19,117 females
  - Municipality: 59,324
- Demonym: Holstebroer
- Time zone: UTC+1 (CET)
  - Summer (DST): UTC+2 (CEST)
- Postal code: 7500
- Area code: (+45) 96
- Website: holstebro.dk

Holstebro Danish pronunciation: [ˈhɒlstəˌpʁoˀ] is the main town in Holstebro Municipality, Denmark. The town is bisected by Storåen ("The Large Creek") and has a population of 37,533 (1 January 2026).

== History ==
The town arose at a ford by the creek, and later a bridge was erected. The name probably derives from holdested ved broen (lit, "a resting place by the bridge").

Holstebro was first mentioned in a letter from Bishop Thyge of Ribe in 1274. A large fire in 1552 destroyed many of the town's old buildings.

On 11 February 1962 parts of Holstebro were hit by a high-end F3/T7 tornado. This was the most devastating tornado in Denmark's history & 3rd strongest. The tornado travelled 13 km with a max width of 500 meters. More than 100 homes were damaged or destroyed. Large brick apartments had their roof torn off and large parts of their third storey destroyed. A concrete barn was entirely destroyed with only one to two exterior walls still standing, and a mobile home was tossed into the air. Damage cost reached 14 million DKK as of 1962, or about 188.9 mil DKK as of 2022

On 10 August 1975, Holstebro recorded a temperature of 36.4 °C (97.5 °F), which is the highest temperature to have ever been recorded in Denmark.

== Modern Holstebro ==
The town is a trading, industrial and cultural center in western Jutland. Industries include the manufacture of processed food, iron and machinery, wood and furniture, textiles and chemicals.

Holstebro has a large network of pedestrian walkways (gågader) in the town centre either side of the River Storå. This area has a varied shopping environment, enhanced by outdoor sculptures and picturesque buildings, including the town church and the Town Hall. The first sculpture purchased by Holstebro Municipality was Alberto Giacometti's sculpture "Maren on vehicle" purchased in 1966.

Holstebro has a rich and varied cultural life. Between 1997 and 2009 it hosted the internationally recognized ballet company Peter Schaufuss Ballet and the town still hosts the performance art theatre Odin Teatret. Several museums, including the Holstebro Art Museum with its collection of Danish and international contemporary art, and the Holstebro Museum can be found in the town.

The town holds an annual culture festival, the Holstebro Festive Week, in late summer. The Holstebro Hall, rebuilt in 1966, houses a music theatre, the Holstebro Convention and Culture Center (1991) and provides space for theatre presentations, concerts, exhibitions and conventions. More than 100 cultural events occur here every year, and the hall is visited by more than 100,000 people annually.

The Jutland Dragoon Regiment (Jydske Dragonregiment), which can trace its history back to 1679 in the times of King Christian V, has made Holstebro its home since 1953. The regiment is Holstebro's largest place of work with more than 1,800 employees.

== Transport ==
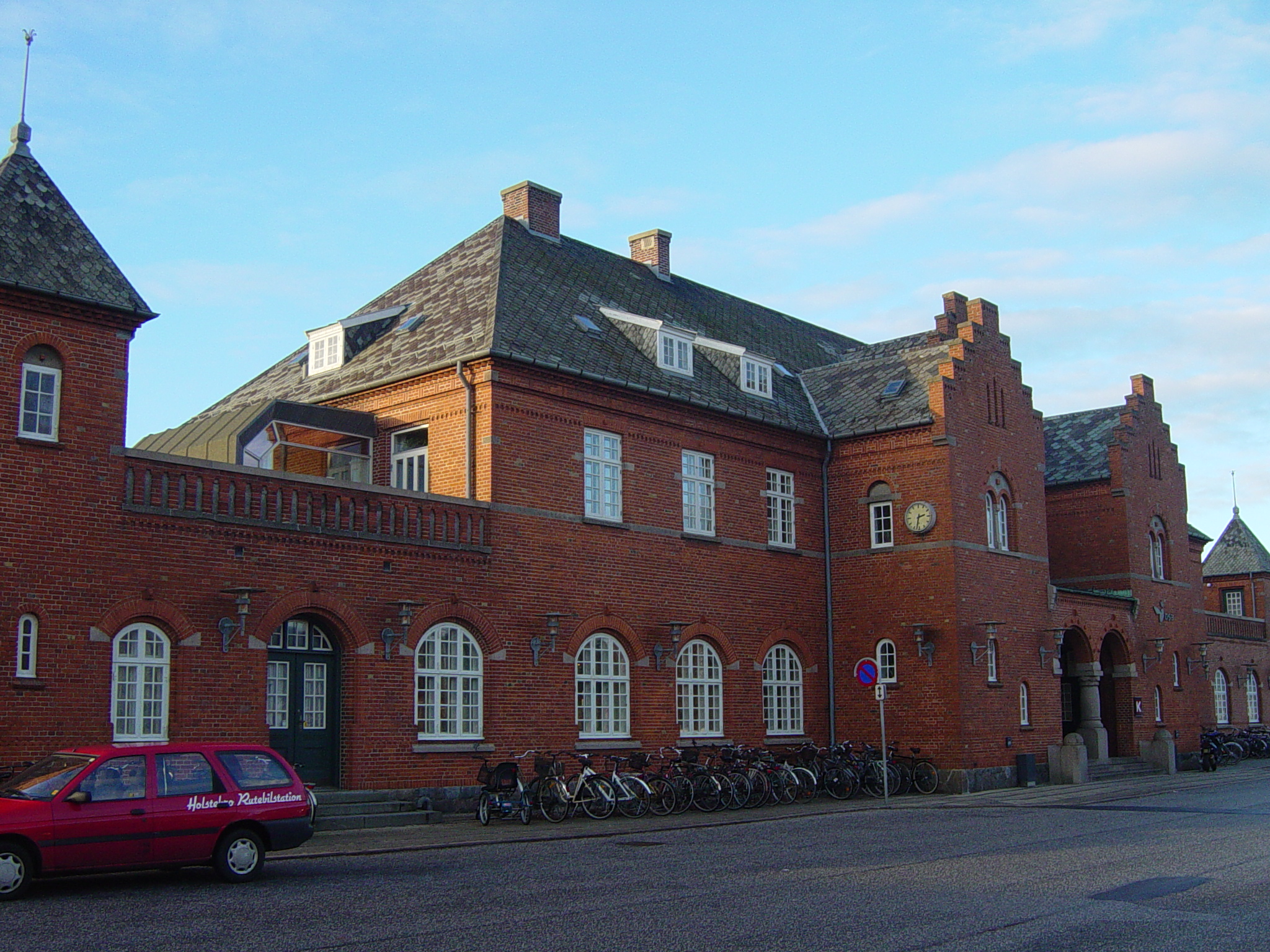
Front façade of Holstebro station.

Holstebro is served by Holstebro railway station. It is located on the Vejle-Holstebro and Esbjerg-Struer railway lines and offers direct InterCity services to Copenhagen and Struer and regional train services to Fredericia and Skjern.

== Sport and leisure ==
Team Tvis Holstebro was founded in 2000 and play handball, representing Holstebro in the men's Danish Handball League and previously in the Danish Women's Handball League. The women's team has won the Women's European Handball Federation cup twice, in 2012–2013 and 2014–2015 and were runner's up in 2010–2011. The team's best placing in the domestic league was 2nd in 2012–13 and, as a result, they competed in the qualification rounds of the 2013–14 EHF Women's Champions League, the highest level competition in Europe. In 2020 Holstebro Håndbold was founded to play in the women's league.

The men's handball team won the Danish Handball Cup in 2008 and have finished third in the domestic league three times, most recently in 2008. They achieved third place in the men's 2012–13 EHF Cup. Both teams play at Gråkjær Arena, a 3,250 capacity hall which can also be used for concerts. The arena is located to the north of the town center.

Holstebro Idrætspark, located to the north-east of the town centre, is a multi-use sports complex. A stadium on the site is home to Holstebro BK, the town's football club who play in the 4th tier of Danish football. The site also features playing fields, beach volleyball courts and a sports hall. A tennis centre, including an indoor hall and seven outdoor courts, adjoins the site and is the home of Holstebro Tennis Club. Holstebro RK play rugby union in the town.

Canoeing and kayaking on the nearly 100 km (62 miles) long Storåen is popular during the summer and early autumn. It is allowed between 15 June and 31 October.

Holstebro Speedway Klub is a motorcycle speedway team who compete in the Danish leagues. The Skave Speedway track is located about 16 kilometres east of Holestebro on Hesselåvej 41B (south of Skave) and is adjacent to the Holstebro Moto Cross track. The venue has hosted important events, including the Danish final as part of the qualifying rounds of the Speedway World Championship in 1994.

=== Jamboree Denmark 2012 ===
A Danish national Scouting Jamboree took place near Holstebro in July 2012. Over 37,000 Scouts and Guides attended the event.

== Notable people ==
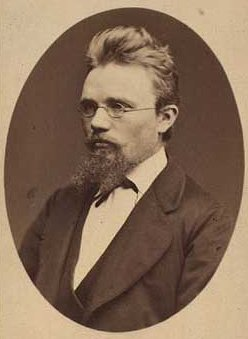
Karl Georg Jensen, 1876

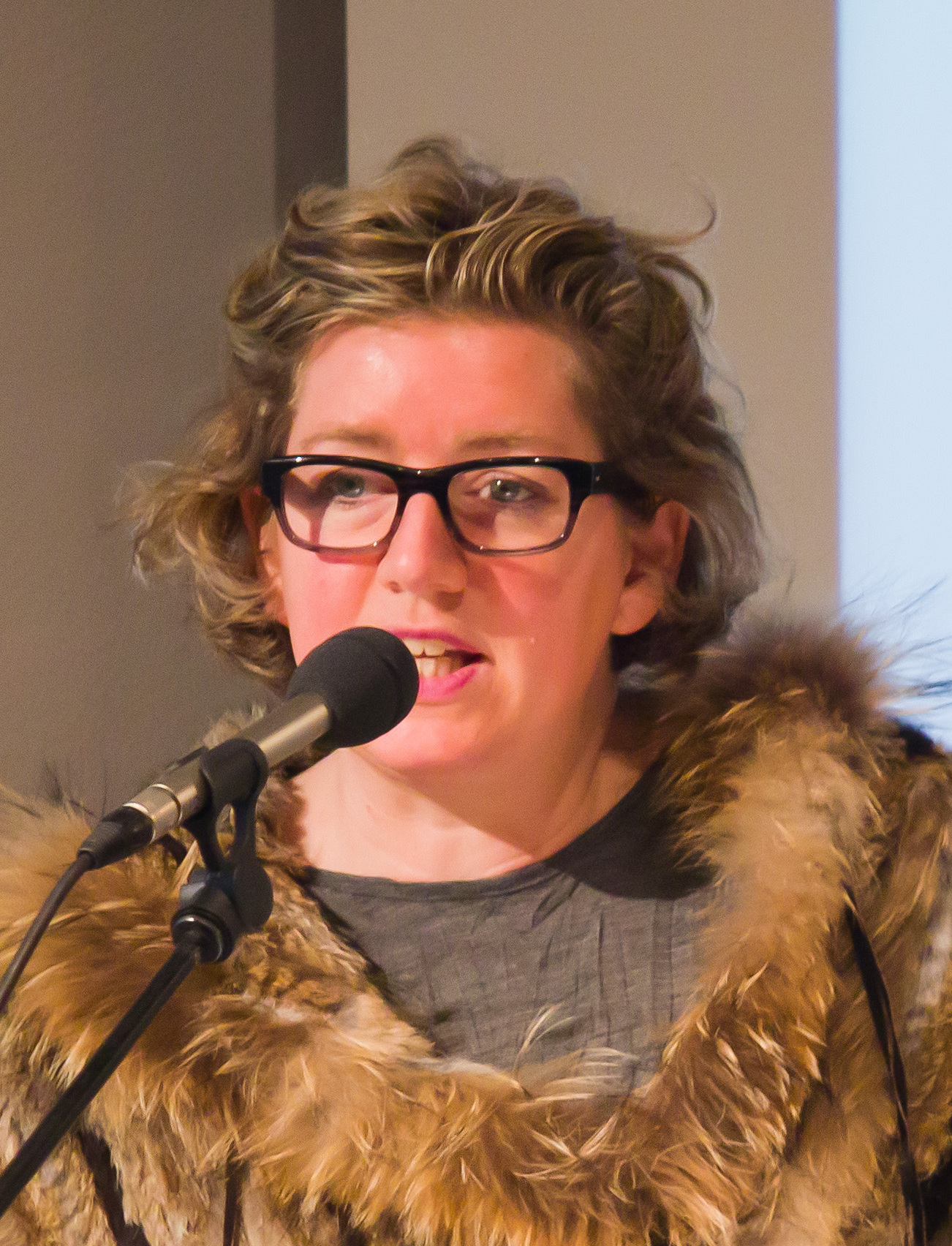
Sahl-Madsen, 2010

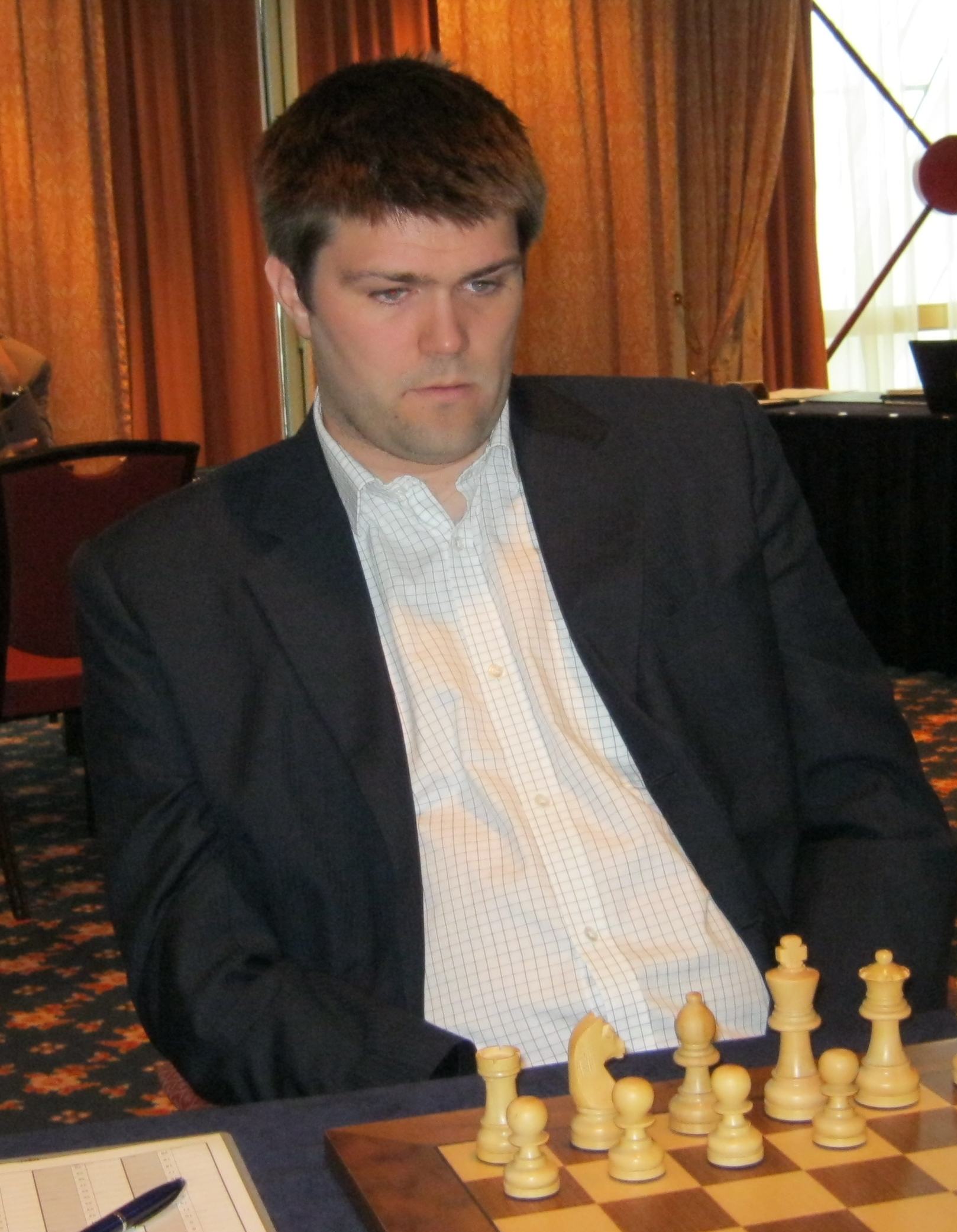
Peter Heine Nielsen, 2010

=== The Arts ===
- Karl Jensen (1851 in Holstebro – 1933) painter of landscapes of northern Zealand
- Knud Agger (1895 in Holstebro – 1973) self-taught painter, visionary and strongly existentialist
- Knud Hvidberg (1927 in Holstebro – 1986) painter and sculptor
- Henning Stærk (born 1949 in Holstebro) singer and musical-performer
- Thomas Søndergård (born 1969 in Holstebro) conductor
- Anne Fortier (born in 1971 in Holstebro) a Danish / Canadian writer, lives in Quebec
- Mikael Simpson (born 1974 in Holstebro) songwriter, singer and film composer
- Iben Dorner (born 1978 in Holstebro) actress and voice artist
- Simon Lynge (born 1980 in Holstebro) singer-songwriter, raised in Greenland
- Elias Ehlers (born 1985 in Holstebro) stand-up comedian

=== Public thinking & Public Service ===
- Charles Christian Lauritsen (1892 in Holstebro – 1968) American physicist
- Cathrine Fabricius-Hansen (born 1942 in Holstebro) Danish-born Norwegian Germanist
- Else Marie Friis (born 1947 in Holstebro) a botanist, paleontologist and academic
- Søren Gade (born 1963 in Holstebro) politician, Minister of Defence 2004/2010
- Charlotte Sahl-Madsen (born 1964 in Holstebro) politician and businesswoman
- Erik Poulsen (born 1967 in Holstebro) politician and MEP
- Claus Bundgård Christensen (born 1968 in Holstebro) historian and academic
- Ove Christiansen (born 1969 in Holstebro) professor of chemistry at Aarhus University
- Jens Rohde (born 1970 in Holstebro) politician and MEP
- Simon Lynge (born 1980 in Holstebro) singer-songwriter, grew up in Qaqortoq, Greenland

=== Sport ===
- Bo Hansen (born 1972 in Holstebro) former footballer, 237 club caps
- Peter Heine Nielsen (born 1973) chess grandmaster, five-time Danish Chess Champion.
- Jesper Damgaard (born 1975) retired professional ice hockey player
- Carsten Svensgaard (born 1975 in Holstebro) curler, competed at the 2002 Winter Olympics
- Claus Bech Jørgensen (born 1976 in Holstebro) Faroese former footballer, over 340 club caps
- Morten Skoubo (born 1980 in Holstebro) retired footballer, over 300 club caps
- Jeppe Huldahl (born 1982 in Holstebro) professional golfer, plays on the European Tour
- Soren "Bjergsen" Bjerg (born 1996 in Holstebro) professional video gamer, six-time LCS champion, plays for TSM

== Twin towns – sister cities ==
Holstebro practices twinning on the municipal level. For the twin towns, see twin towns of Holstebro Municipality.
