= Turaida (disambiguation) =

Turaida is name of the main hillfort of the former Livonian county Turaida, which nowadays is a part of Sigulda in Latvia.

Other places named or referred to as "Turaida" include:

- Turaida Castle in Latvia.

Other:

- Rose of Turaida
- Caupo of Turaida
- Battle of Turaida
- Battle of Turaida (1211)
