= Legend of Turaida Rose =

Latvian legend

Coordinates: 57°10′57.306″N 24°51′0.919″E

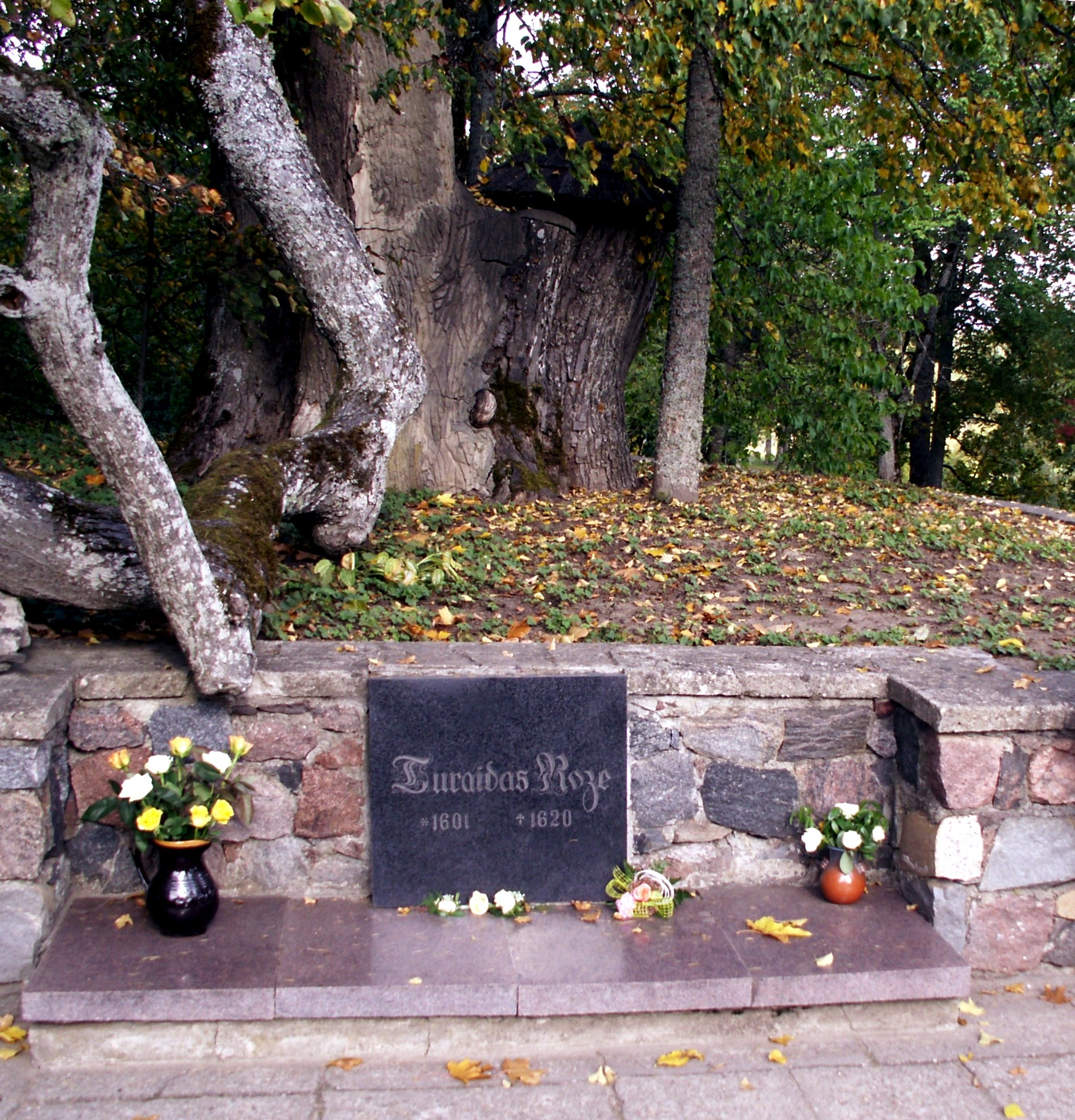
The grave.

The Legend about Turaida Rose (sometimes Rose of Sigulda) is a 19th century legend about a young woman named Maija murdered in the Gutman's Cave and whose grave, in the grounds of Turaida Castle in Latvia, is still much visited. In 19th century court documents were found (and publicized in 1848) which relate events that served a base for the legend. The legend entered into literary circulation and in other forms of art. The same 1848 year the Baltic-German poet Adelbert Cammerer published the poem Die Jungfrau von Treiden. Other works followed.

== Story ==
After a battle at the foot of Turaida Castle in 1601, the castle clerk, while searching for survivors, found a baby in the arms of its dead mother. He called the child Maija and brought her up as his own. She grew up to be very beautiful and so was known as the "Rose of Turaida". She fell in love with Viktor, the gardener at the castle of Sigulda (opposite Turaida over the Gauja River) and in the autumn of 1620 they prepared to be married. Shortly before the wedding Maija received a letter from Viktor asking her to meet him at the Gutmanis Cave, their usual meeting place. She went to the cave with Lenta, the young daughter of her adoptive father. When she reached it, however, it was not Viktor she encountered but a Polish nobleman or soldier called Adam Jakubowski who was lying in wait for her with the intention of forcing her to be his wife. Maija promised to give him her magic scarf, that had the power to make the wearer immune from injury (in some versions the scarf is impossible to cut through), if he would let her go, and persuaded him to test its power on her. He struck her with an axe and she died, having thus saved her honour.

In the evening Viktor came to the cave and found the body of his betrothed and was accused of the murder. But in court there appeared a witness called Peteris Skudritis, who testified that he had been commissioned by Jakubowski to deliver the fatal letter. Lenta confirmed the course of events. Viktor buried his betrothed near the castle, planted a linden tree on the grave and left the country forever. According to documents in Sigulda's archives the soldier was later caught, tried and hanged for his crime. From then on it has been customary for newlyweds to leave flowers on the grave of the Rose of Turaida in hopes of knowing the same eternal love and devotion.

== Influence in culture ==
- 1848: Magnus von Wolffeldt (Magnus Johann Ritter von Wolffeldt), in Mittheilungen aus dem Strafrecht und dem Strafprocess in Livland, Ehstland und Kurland<...>, retelling the court protocols from year 1620 about the case
- 1848: Adelbert Cammerer,Die Jungfrau von Treiden, poem.
- 1856/1857: Juris Dauge, "Turaidas jumprava", story, republished several times
- Ernsts Dinsbergis, "Maijas Roze", song
- Jānis Ruģēns, Kad aiziesi uz Turaidi…, poem
- 1892: Teodors Hāns, Turaidas Roze, play
- 1926/1927: Rainis, Mīla stiprāka par nāvi, ("Love is Stronger than Death"), tragedy play. The play attracted significant popularity to the legend and people started bringing flowers to the cave
- 1926: Emilis Melngailis, "Maija (Turaidas roze)", ballet
- 1966: Jānis Ķepīš, ballet
- 1976: In the Shadow of a Sword, film
- 2000: Zigmārs Liepiņš (music), Kaspars Dimiters (libretto), No rozes un asinīm, opera

There are also several paintings and a postal stamp.
