= Gutman's Cave =

Cave in Latvia

Gūtmaņa ala
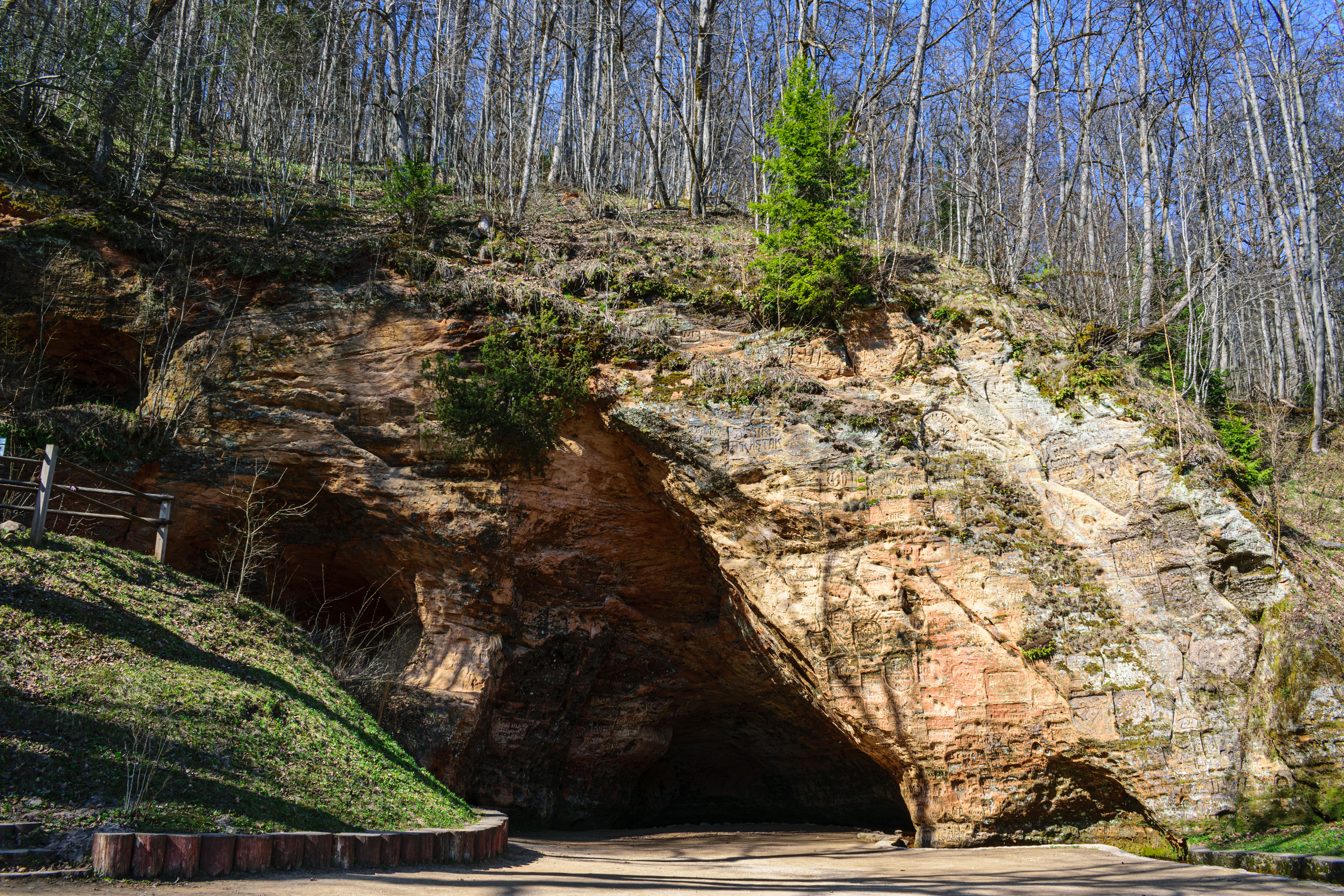
- Gutman's Cave
- Interactive map of Gūtmaņa ala
- Location: Latvia, Sigulda
- Coordinates: 57°09′56″N 24°50′45″E
- Entrances: 1
- Translation: Gutman's Cave (Latvian)

Gutman's Cave (Latvian: Gūtmaņa ala) is the widest and highest cave in the Baltic countries, located by the Gauja River in the area known as the ancient Gauja valley in the Gauja National Park near Sigulda, Latvia. It started forming more than 10,000 years ago when meltwater eroded the sandstone rock after the Ice Age. It is the oldest tourist attraction in Latvia. On the walls of the cave are inscriptions from the 17th century. The legend of the Rose of Turaida began in this cave.

== Description ==
Gutman's Cave is the widest and highest cave in the Baltics. It is 18.8 meters deep, 12 meters wide and 10 meters high. The cave was formed from the yellow-brown sandstone rock of the Gauja river bank; its formation is due to a millennium long interaction between the river and an underground spring.

The cave is considered the oldest tourist attraction in Latvia because visitors, from even the earliest days, have left “decorations” such as names, initials and the dates of their visits engraved on the walls of the cave. Inside the cave are coats-of-arms and the names of various barons and estate owners. These were made to order for a fee by local craftsmen who would wait for wealthy visitors near the cave armed with tools, stepladders and templates. Writing on the cave walls is no longer permitted as the site is a protected archeological and geological monument.

Gutman's Cave is a place of ancient worship. Until the 19th century, people would come to make their offerings to the deities.

== Story of Rose of Turaida ==
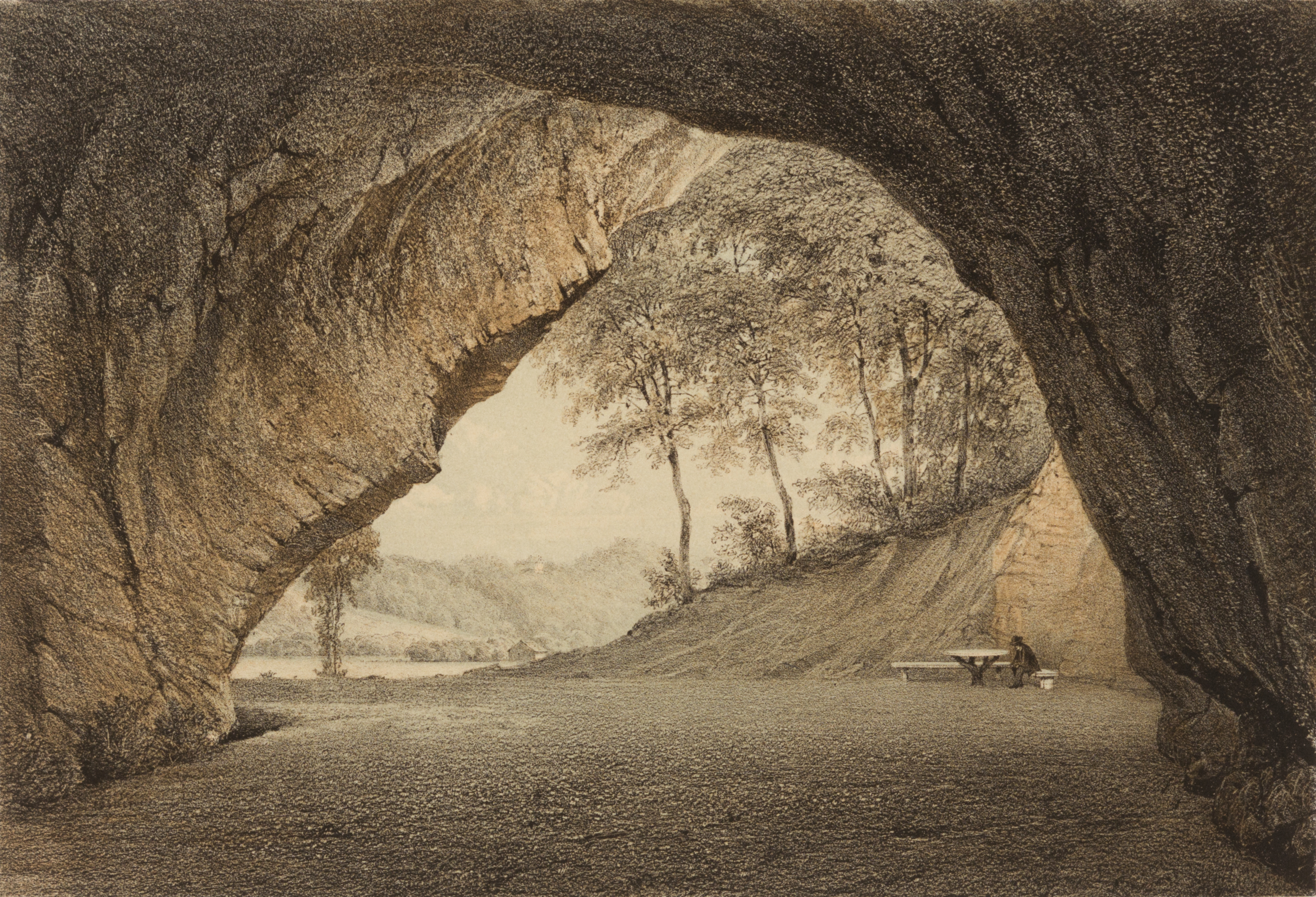
An 1860 drawing of Gutman's cave by Louis Höflinger

The legend states that in the spring of 1601 during the Polish–Swedish wars, the Swedish army occupied Turaida Castle. After the battle the record keeper of the castle, named Greif, found a little girl just a few weeks old among the dead bodies. He took her in and raised her as his daughter. It happened to be the month of May so he named her Maija/May. As the years went by the little girl grew to be a beautiful young maiden and because of her beauty she was called the Rose of Turaida. Her fiancé, Victor Hail, was a gardener at Sigulda Castle on the opposite side of the Gauja river and in the evenings they would meet at Gutman's Cave.

A Polish deserter, Jakubovsky, lusted after Maija and wanted her to marry him, but the girl turned down his proposal. This angered Jakubovksy and he decided to take her by force. He sent his fellow deserter Skudritis to her with a fake message from Victor telling her to come to the usual meeting place but at a different time. When the girl arrived and realized that she was trapped, she chose to die instead of be shamed. At that time people believed in the power of magic. Maija had a red silk scarf around her neck, a gift from Victor. She offered this scarf, which, she said, bore magic powers and was impossible to cut through, in exchange for letting her go. She encouraged Jacubovky to test the powers of the scarf and use his sword to see if she was telling the truth. Initially Jakubovsky hesitated, but then cut with full force only to see the girl collapse. Jakubovky, fearing punishment for his deed, ran off to the woods and hanged himself. Later that night Victor found his love murdered in the cave and ran to Turaida for help. In the rush he lost his axe at the scene and was eventually accused of murder and sentenced to death. However, the course of events was changed by Skudritis who had followed Jakubovsky and had seen what happened. He told the court what he witnessed and Victor was acquitted. The girl was buried in the cemetery by Turaida church where you may visit her final resting place. For a very long time this story was thought to be a sad legend, but in the middle of the 19th century the court archives in Vidzeme revealed the transcript of the murder case of Maija in the Gutman's Cave dated August 1620. This ancient legend has led many artists to create works in praise of the devotion of The Rose of Turaida and the power of love.

Right next to Gutman's Cave is the smaller Victor's Cave. The story goes that Victor Hail hacked out this cave for his fiancée, the Rose of Turaida, so she could watch him at work in the gardens of Sigulda Castle.

The story of Maija and Victor is similar to that of Romeo and Juliet, and for this reason Sigulda is sometimes known as the "City of Love".
