= Sigulda Medieval Castle =

Castle in Latvia

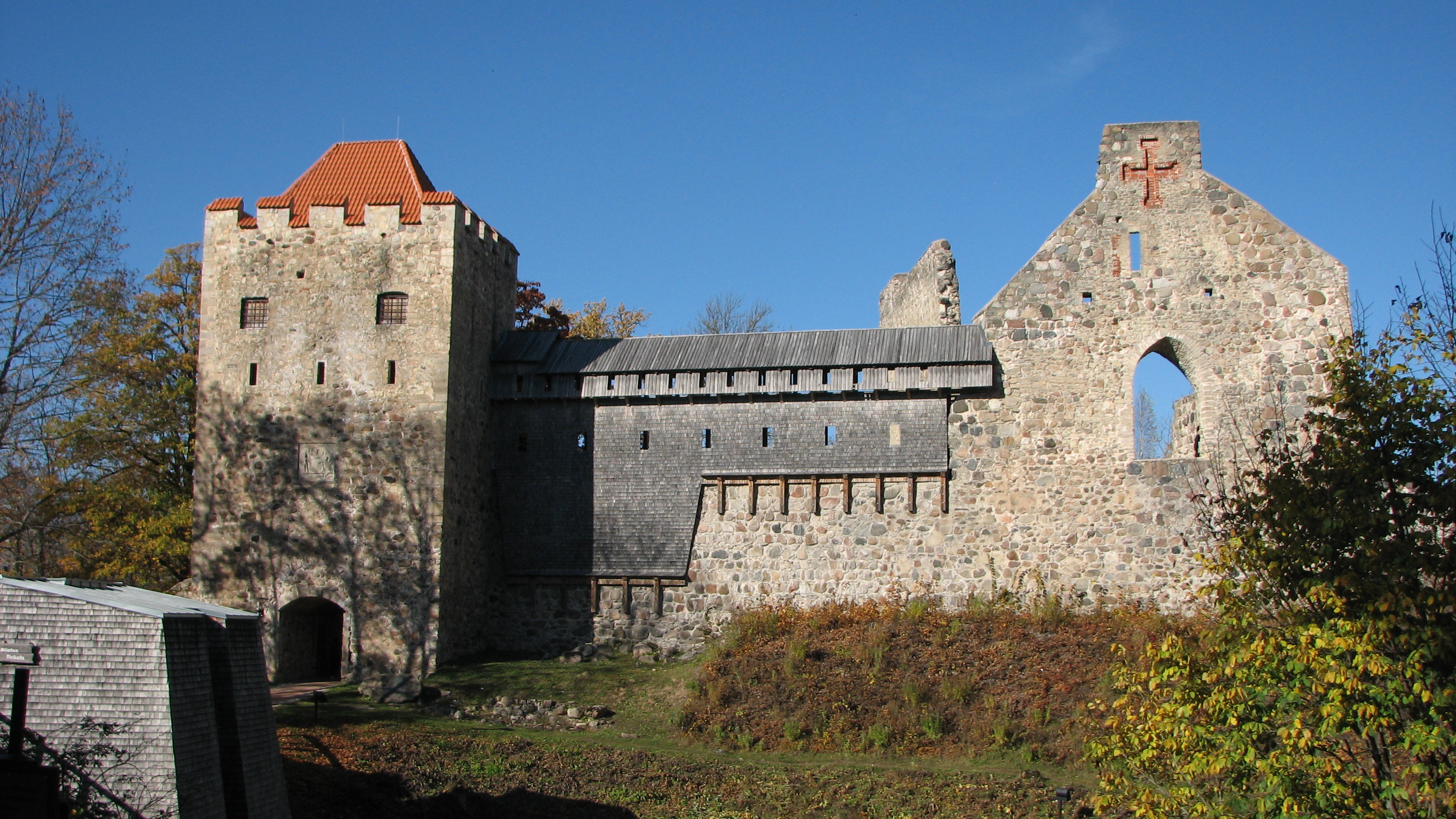
- Ruins of the Sigulda Medieval Castle (2018)

Site information
- Type: Castle
- Open to the public: open
- Condition: Ruins

Location
- Coordinates: 57°9′59.22″N 24°50′58.49″E

Site history
- Built: 1207
- Built by: Livonian Order

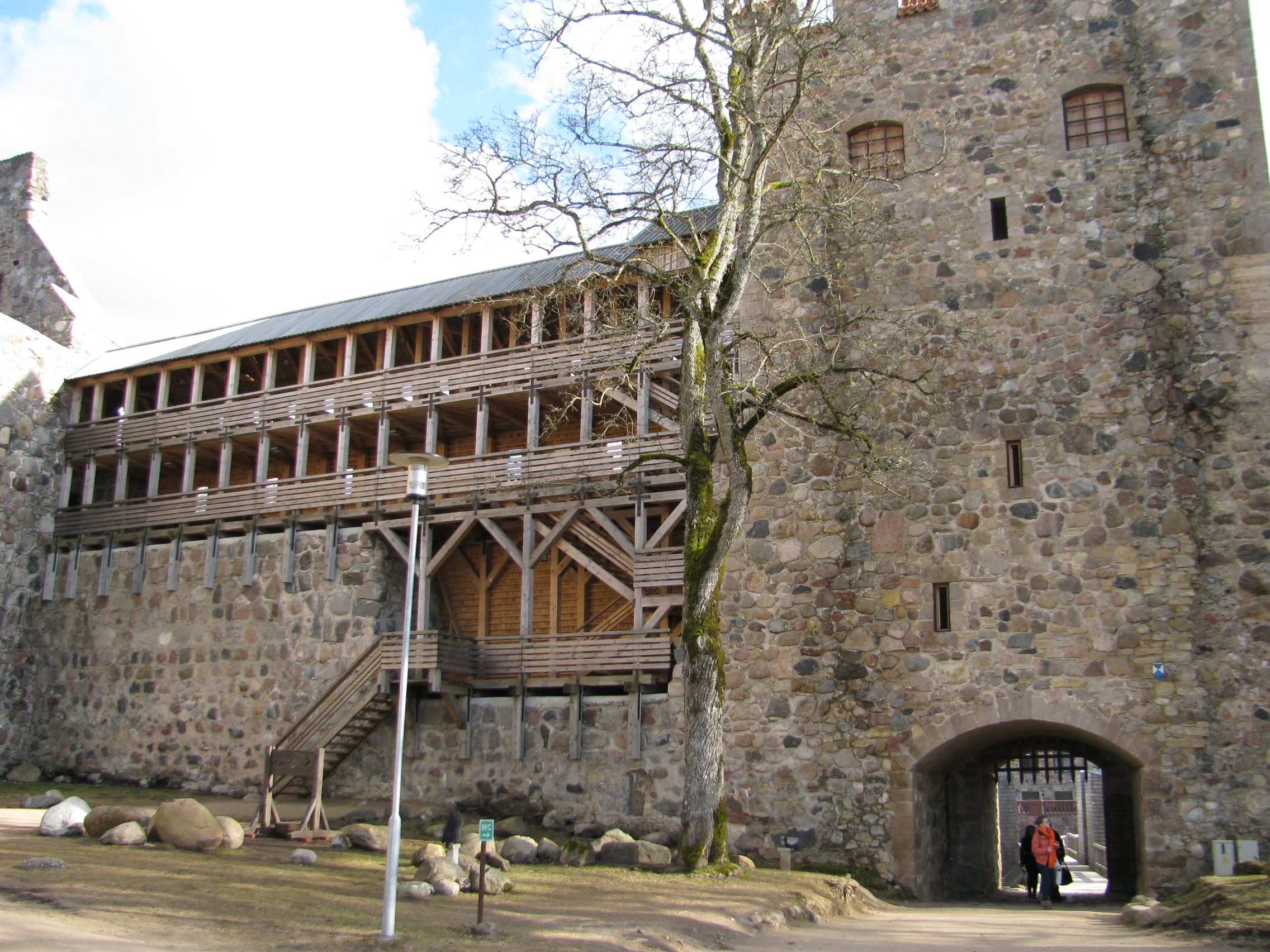
Sigulda Castle ruins

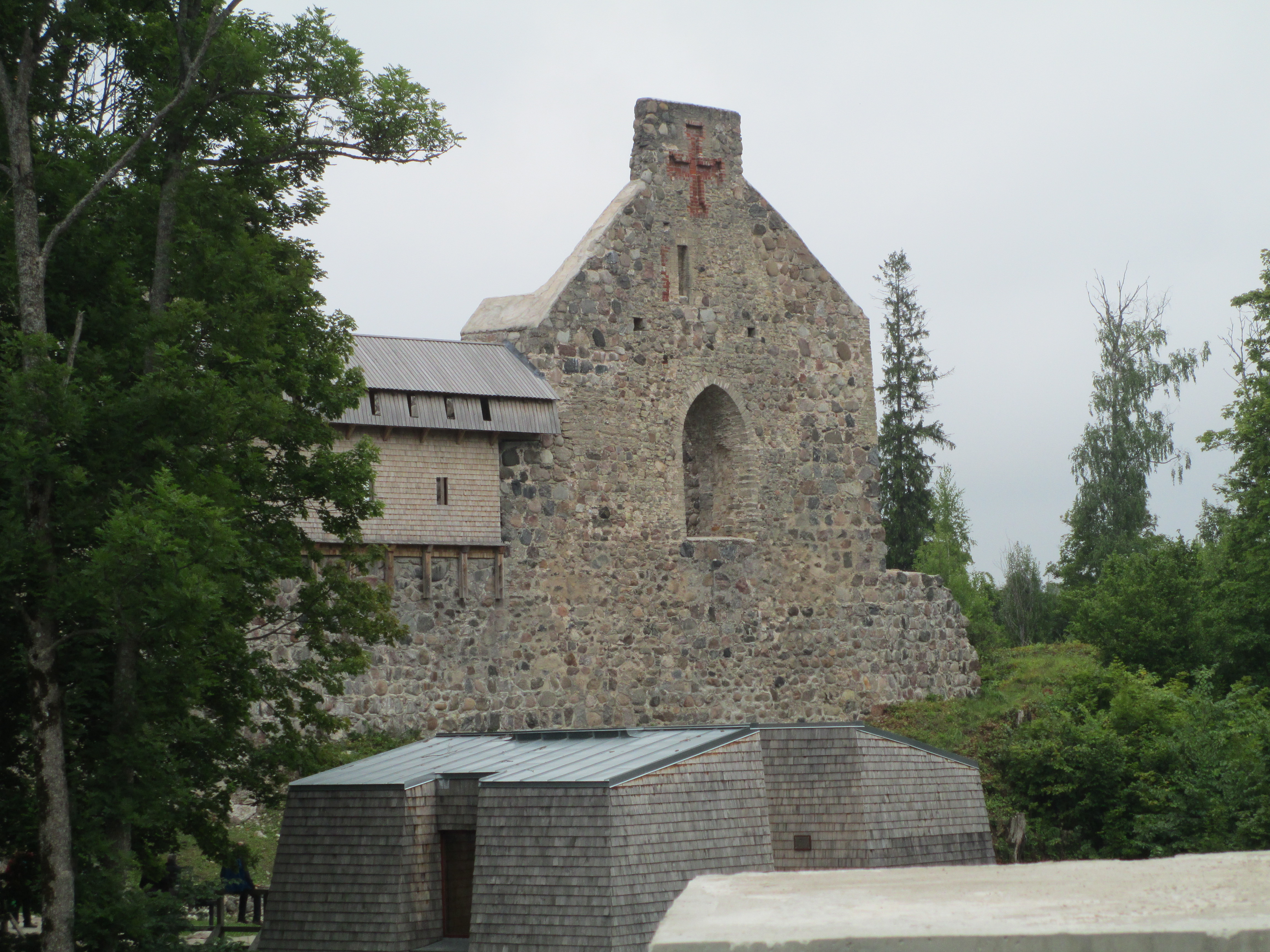
Sigulda ruins

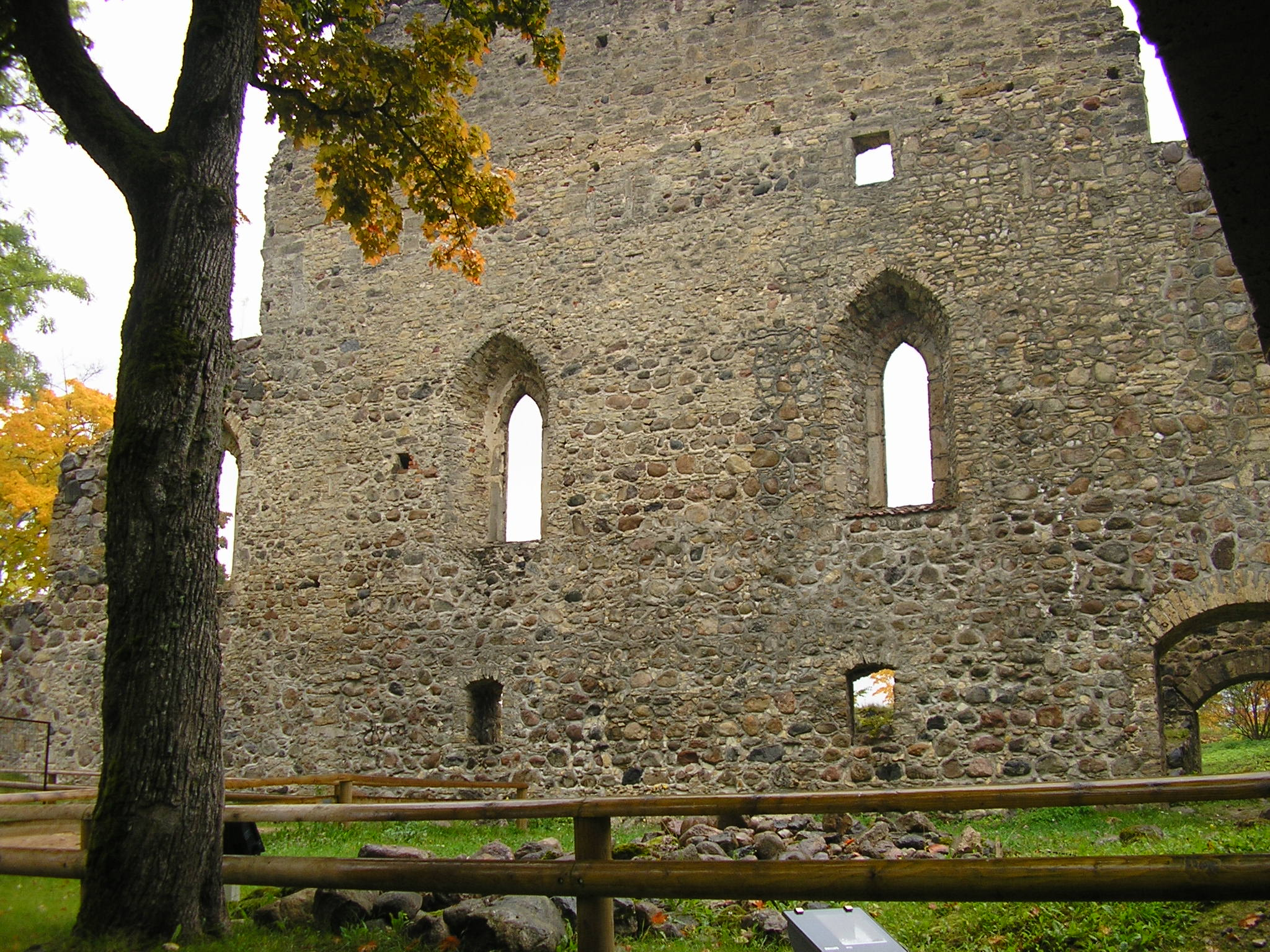
Sigulda ruins

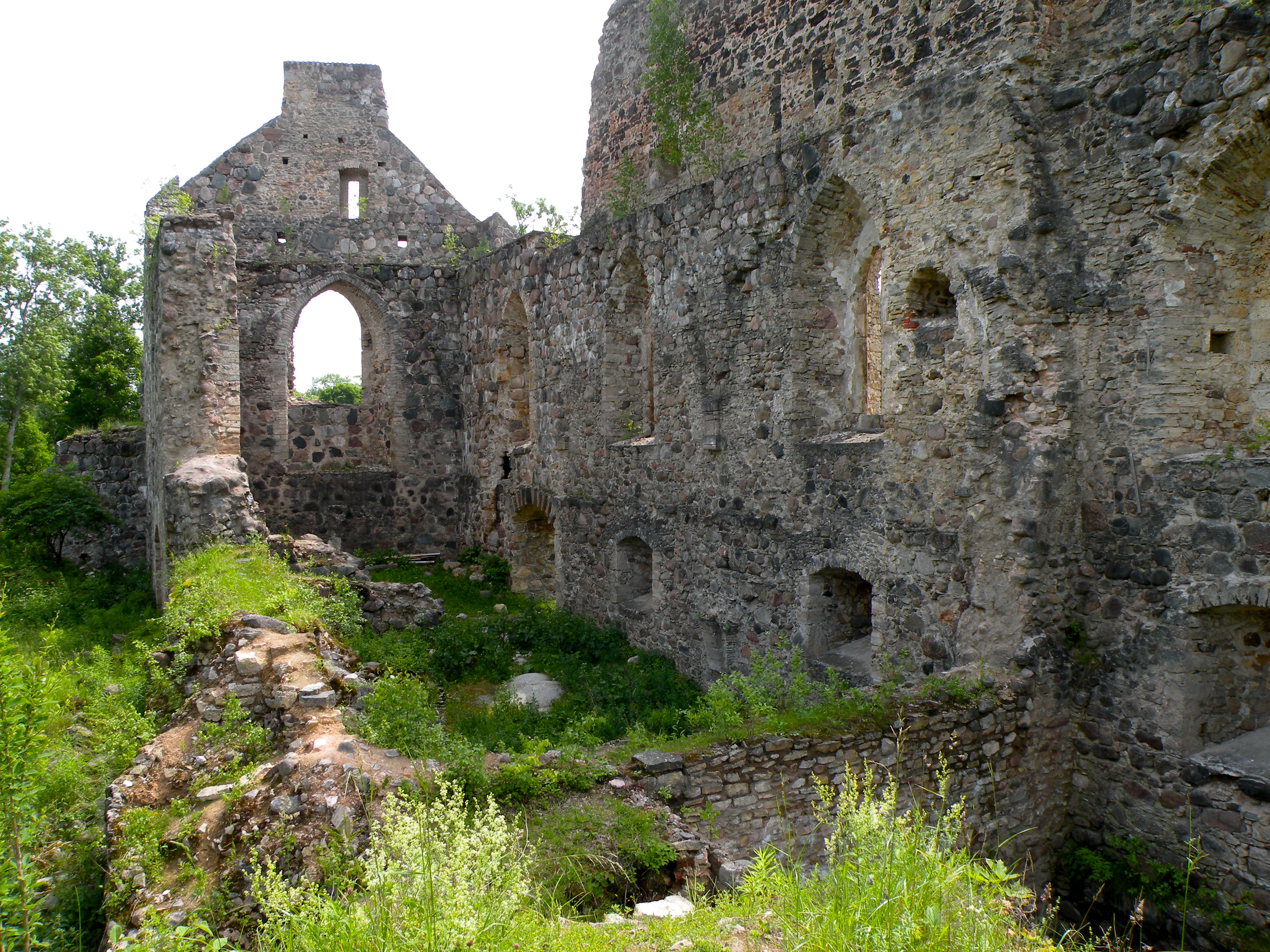
Sigulda ruins

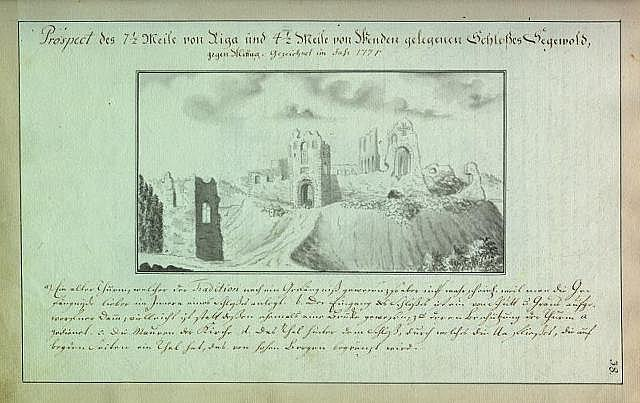
Ruins in 1771

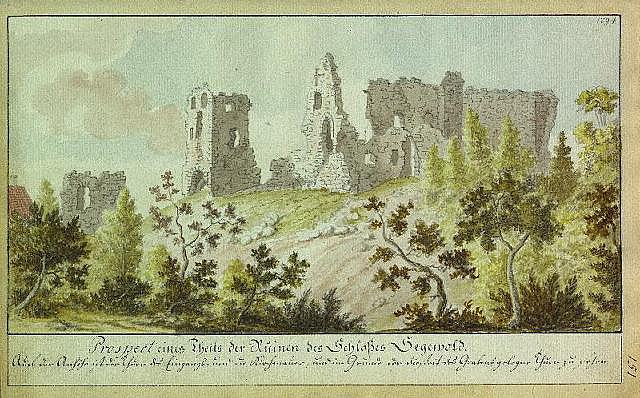
Ruins in 1794

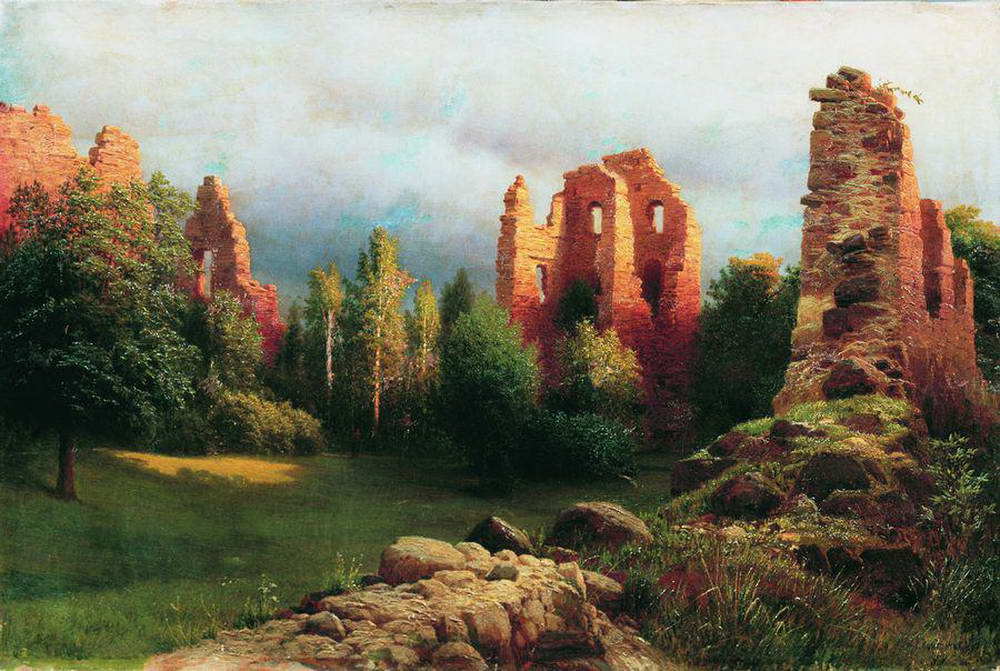
Ruins in late 19th century

Sigulda Medieval Castle ruins are located on the edge of the Gauja valley in the Vidzeme region of Latvia. The original castle was built in 1207 as a castellum type fortress, later rebuilt into a convent type building. The residence of the Land Marshal of the Livonian Order since 1432.

Due to its importance as a tourist attraction, the old castle walls have been fortified many times in the 20th century. The castle reopened its walls to visitors in 2012 and now encourages everyone to step back in time and enjoy the surroundings that bore witness to many historical events. It is possible to climb up the North Tower, the Main Gate Tower and enjoy the medieval aura.

== History ==
Sigulda Medieval Castle was built by the Livonian Brothers of the Sword who were later incorporated into the Teutonic Order of the castle, thus the castle eventually became the property of the Livonian Order. The Livonian Brothers of the Sword, officially known as The Militia of Christ of Livonia, was a military order composed of German "warrior monks.” They later became better known as the Livonian Brothers of the Sword due to the symbols on their white capes: a red sword and cross. The order, founded in 1202, was the first "warrior monk” order formed outside the Mediterranean region. Historical documents indicate bishop Albert of Riga and Cistercian abbot Theoderich were the co-founders of the order. The military order's mission was to remain in Livonia to protect the land and conquer new territories.

As part of the land division between themselves and Bishop Albert in 1207, the order gained the territory which stretched along the left side of the Gauja River. In the ongoing competition to determine hegemony between the Bishop and the Livonian Order, castle placement became a strategic factor. According to the Rhymed Chronicles, the castle was erected sometime between 1207 and 1209 under the direction of Master Venno of the Order of the Brethren of the Sword. The Livonian Chronicle of Henry says that the castle was in use by the Brothers of the Sword as a base while battling revolting Livonians that were invading from a nearby castle. The castle was initially built to monitor and control the water ways of the Gauja River and to fend off any invasion attempts from the nearby bishop's castle in Turaida which was located on the river's west coast. In 1224 the Pope's legate, Wilhelm of Modena, stayed at the castle and established both a church and parish. In 1237 the lands of the Livonian Brothers of the Sword become the property of the Teutonic Order who continued to conquer additional territories in Latvia up until 1290. Since 1432 Sigulda Castle was the residence of the Land Marshal of the Livonian Order (Latin: marsalcus terrae Livoniae), the second highest officer of the order, after the Livonian Master, who lived in the Cēsis Medieval Castle.

At the very beginning of the Livonian war, the castle was damaged. In 1562 it became a part of the Duchy of Livonia and from 1566 the residence of the governor of Livonia Jan Hieronimowicz Chodkiewicz. At the end of the 16th century, the Poles repaired the castle and its surrounding buildings. During the Polish – Swedish war the castle was seriously damaged. After the war, the Swedes reported that the castle was empty and destroyed. In the 1622 it was again restored and a new residential building and sauna were built. In 1625, the King of Sweden bestowed Sigulda as a gift to his Privy Councillor Gabriel Gustafsson Oxenstierna, however, after the manor house reduction program it once again became state property. A layout of Sigulda Castle, created around 1680, is stored in the War Archive in Stockholm. The castle was abandoned again during The Great Northern War.

In 1737 Sigulda became a private estate. It was first the property of the Governor of Livland Peter Lacy, followed by George Brown and von der Borch family. At the beginning of the 19th century the castle once again got attention but, following the trend of the times, it was simply admired as a romantic ruin.

In the 19th century the castle and its layout were remodeled and a gate, inscribed with the year 1867, was added to the front part of the castle. The gate tower surrounding the inner castle building was decorated with the Borch family coat of arms. Additionally, the ruins of the castle were fortified and two pseudo-gothic arches were constructed. Finally, between 1878 and 1881, a new castle was built by Prince Kropotkin's family.

After World War I with the establishment of independent Republic of Latvia, the ruins have been under the auspices of the Monument Board. Monument protection concerns caused some construction work to be done in order to renew the gate tower and other important parts of the castle. In 1922 Karl Woldemar von Löwis of Menar found a revised reconstruction plan for the castle, dated from the 17th century. It is currently housed at the Archive in Stockholm. Estonian art history researcher, Armin Tulse, discovered information related to the actual construction.

In depth research and renovation of Sigulda castle began in 1962. Measurements were made of the construction plan, facade and wall details. A topographic plan of the castle and its surrounding was created in 1978. Historians used photo-fixation techniques as they collected all available castle data. Archaeological excavations of the ruins were supervised by Normunds Treijs from 1987 to 1988 and by Jānis Ciglis in 1997. Architect Tatjana Vītola devised a method for fortifying the castle walls which has been used several times since 1962. In 2011, the European Union co-sponsored a project designed to assist with the renovations. It was officially titled “Reconstruction of Sigulda Castle Ruins and Infrastructure Adjustment for Tourism Development” and successfully concluded in 2012.

== Archeology of the Castle ==
Sigulda Medieval castle is situated on the edge of the ancient Gauja valley on a projection formed by three steep slopes. A deep ditch at the south side of the castle was constructed to protect the castle buildings by separating them from the rest of the land. The castle sits on a highland and is naturally protected from invaders by high, steep slopes. Special ponds were created to secure the castle's southeast side. Sigulda castle was originally built as a castellum or Roman-type watch tower and was later modified. It consisted of several interconnected structures which included a central building or castellum, an inner castle forepart and an outer or southern forepart.

The building of Sigulda castle can be divided into several time periods. Construction started at the beginning of the 13th century. The first building was of rectangular shape and made of dolomite blocks with 3 meter thick walls. Below this, a large basement was built, 10 x 9.5 meters, with a Roman style column in the middle of the room supporting the vault. A fragment of this building remains today as it was cemented into the southern wall of the castellum that was built later. According to historian Tulse, the second stage of construction occurred during the last quarter of the 13th century through the end of the 14th century when the square-shaped central complex or castellum with its inner courtyard surrounded by three buildings was erected. This converted the former castellum into a typical convent-type castle. Local stone was primarily used for construction although the walls and certain architectural elements were made of dolomite and limestone. The three-story high, south-west section of the convent building survives to this day. The chapel, which was ten meters wide and had Gothic window lintels and a lancet arch, was located at the southern end of the second floor. Its wall was decorated with a cross. The third floor was used to store weapons. In the second half of the 15th century, as firearms evolved, the machicolations on the battlements were rebuilt and the chapel and hall on the south complex second floor got larger windows.

The central castle complex was surrounded by an inner fore-castle in the shape of an irregular square measuring 80 x 100 meters at its widest part. The square shaped towers projected out from the wall surrounding the southern side of the forecastle and its northeastern corner. The outbuildings along the side yards were built in the 17th century. Downstream, another wall was built to secure the inner fore-part of the castle. A small wicket gate at the north side of the inner forecastle leads to the Gauja River. The main entrance, at the southern side of the castle, swept through a four-story high gate tower that was built around the year 1400. At the forefront was a drawbridge with a tower sitting on the opposite side of the ditch. A vaulted entrance on the southwest wing of the castella connected the inner yard of the forecastle with the inner yard of the castle.

The lower part of the castellum was guarded and occupied by servants. The hall, built in the Gothic style, was located on the main floor. A chapel was constructed on the southeast side of the castle. The storage rooms with weapons and the machicolations were built above the main floor.

Records show that the forecastle used to be three times larger than the inner castle or main building and was surrounded by a wall with a gate in the southern wall. Architectural plans dating from the 17th century show the outbuildings and yards used to be located in the outer forecastle. The structure of the main castle began to weaken around the 17th century.

== See also ==
- Turaida Castle
- Sigulda new Castle
- Gutman's cave
- Krimulda Castle
