= Aerodium Sigulda =

Company based in Latvia

Aerodium Sigulda is a company based in Latvia, which owns and runs the first vertical wind tunnel in Eastern Europe. The wind tunnel is located near Sigulda, the most visited tourist area in Latvia. It is affiliated with Aerodium Technologies, a designer and producer of vertical wind tunnels. While being open to the public, it also serves as a testing base for new technologies and a training place for instructors.

== History ==
In 2003 the Latvian entrepreneur Ivars Beitāns decided to elaborate on the wind tunnel concept and by summer 2005 the first wind tunnel was opened in Sigulda. It was an open wall-less tunnel installed outdoors reaching a wind speed of 200 km/h with a diameter of 3.7 meters.

In the "Sigulda county's man of the year 2005" competition, Beitāns was awarded in the category "For contribution to development of Sigulda county" and Aerodium won an award in the nomination "For the investment in county's community life". More importantly, having a wind tunnel allowed Ivars Beitāns and his friends to train for the Torino 2006 Olympic games, where Aerodium surprised the world with a flying snowboarder performance in an open tunnel at the closing ceremony. For this purpose, Sigulda's wind tunnel had to be sent over to Italy in February 2006.

On May 3, 2017, a new generation open wind tunnel replaced the already outdated first model. It features air velocity of 215 km/h and a 2.8 meters flying zone. Major improvements were made towards ensuring safety by expanding the safety net and adding very safe, custom-built safety cushions. Aerodium also managed to significantly lower the noise emissions, which allows this technology to be operated in urban areas.
