= Battle of Turaida =

1298 failed invasion of Riga by the Livonian Order

- Part of Livonian Civil War
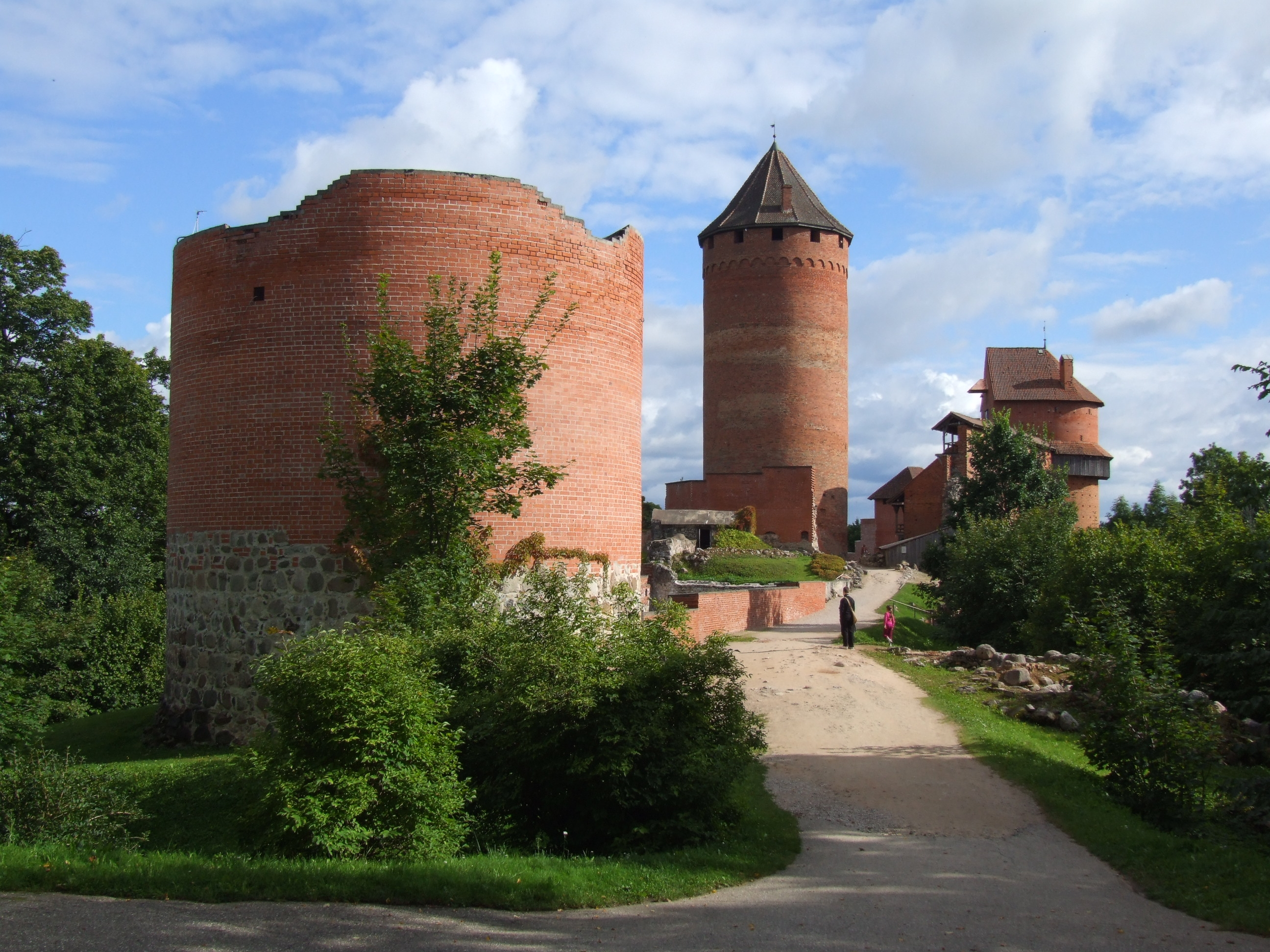
- Turaida Castle
Date	June 1, 1298
Location	On Gauja near Turaida Castle 57°11′00″N 24°51′00″E
Result	Livonian Order defeated

Belligerents
Residents of Riga; Grand Duchy of Lithuania	Livonian Order

Commanders and leaders
Vytenis	Grand Master Bruno †

Casualties and losses
Unknown	20–22 or 60 knights killed

The Battle of Turaida or Treiden (also known as the Battle on Aa) was fought on June 1, 1298, on the banks of the Gauja River (German: Livländische Aa) near the Turaida Castle (Treiden). The Livonian Order was decisively defeated by the residents of Riga allied with the Grand Duchy of Lithuania under the command of Vytenis.

In 1296, a civil war broke out in Terra Mariana between the burghers of Riga and the Livonian Order. Johannes III von Schwerin, Archbishop of Riga, unsuccessfully attempted to mediate the dispute. As the conflict grew, Johannes III joined the cause of the Riga residents, but was defeated and taken prisoner. In March 1298, Riga concluded an alliance with pagan Grand Duchy of Lithuania, which was a subject of a Catholic crusade by the Teutonic Knights and Livonian Order.

The Lithuanians, commanded by Grand Duke Vytenis, invaded Livonia and besieged Karkhus (Karksi). Once the castle fell, the Lithuanians looted, massacred, and took many prisoners. The defensive Livonian forces engaged the Lithuanians on the Gauja River. At first, it seemed that the knights were winning the battle, but Vytenis vigorously counterattacked with reinforcements from the Archbishop and dealt a decisive defeat. Livonian Grand Master Bruno and komtur of Fellin were killed. According to different sources, either 60 or 20–22 noble knights were killed in the battle. If indeed it was 60, then the battle would be comparable to the Battle of Saule in terms of casualties. If about 20 knights were killed, it would still be in the top 10 defeats suffered by the Teutonic and Livonian forces in the 13th century.

On June 28, the Livonian Order received reinforcements from the Teutonic Knights and defeated residents of Riga and Lithuanians near Neuermühlen. According to inflated numbers reported by Peter von Dusburg, some 4,000 Rigans and Lithuanians died at Neuermühlen. The knights proceeded to besiege and capture Riga. After Eric VI of Denmark threatened to invade Livonia to assist Archbishop Johannes III, a truce was reached and the conflict was mediated by Pope Boniface VIII. However, the conflict was not resolved and the alliance between Lithuania and Riga continued for another fifteen years.
