= Sigulda Castle =

Castle in Latvia

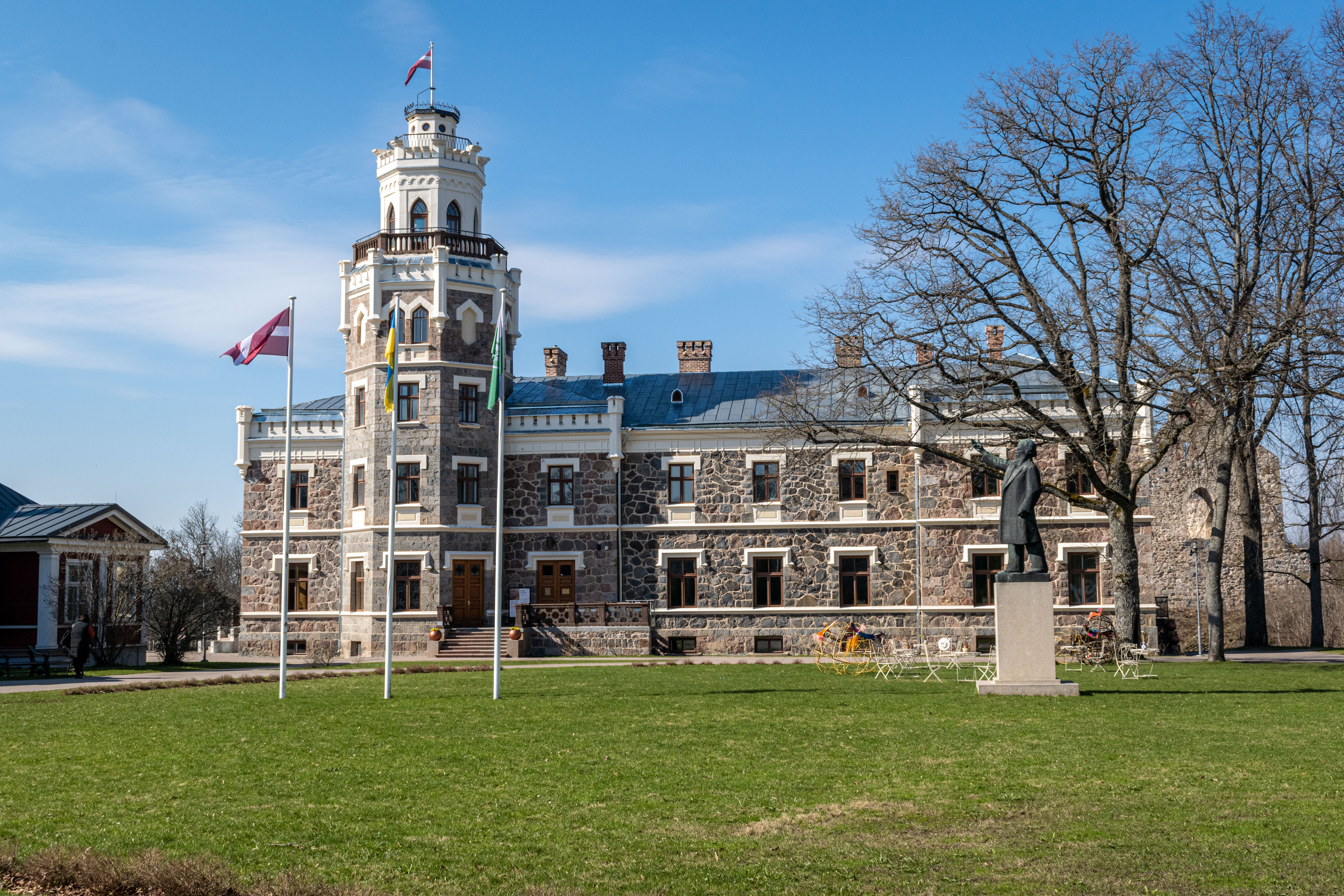
- Sigulda Castle

Site information
- Type: Manor

Location
- Coordinates: 57°9′56.37″N 24°50′58.96″E

Sigulda Castle, also known as Sigulda New Castle (Latvian: Siguldas jaunā pils), is a castle in Sigulda, Sigulda Municipality in the Vidzeme region of Latvia. It was built in 1878 in the Neo-Gothic style as a residence for the owners of the manor, the Kropotkin family. The building has changed its owners and functions several times. Since 1993, the Sigulda Region Council has been located in the castle.

== History ==
The manor center began to develop in the fore-castle area of Sigulda Medieval Castle during the 17th century. There are still a few remaining 18th- and 19th-century buildings constructed during the ownership of the Von Borghs and Kropotkins. These are the Summer Castle, the New Castle, the White Castle, the vagar's (supervisor of serfs) house, the servants' house, a barn, a laundry house and a vegetable and fruit basement. The manor center is enclosed by chipped boulder walls with a splendid gate structure.

The New Castle was constructed during the time of Duchess Olga and Duke Dimitry Kropotkins from 1878 until 1881 using the materials from an older building which stood here in the 17th century.

The master’s house was built in neo-gothic style by Jānis Mengelis from Cēsis. The planning and the shape of the house is simple. The architectural and artistic value of the castle is achieved through the successful use of Gothic forms and the color shades from the recycled chipped boulders. Looking through any window, a view of the Gauja valley is visible, including the ruins of Sigulda castle. Further away the ruins of Krimulda and Turaida can be seen. On the opposite side, there is a landscaped yard.

During World War I, this building was destroyed. In 1922, following the agrarian reforms, New Castle became the Writers’ Castle because it was used by the Latvian Union of Writers and Journalists. The building was in an unusable condition after the war so the Union had to invest a large amount of money for restoration. In the 1920s and 1930s, full room and board was offered to writers and literary types as well as other visitors.

In 1934, the castle was acquired by the Latvian Press Society. From 1936 to 1937, major reconstruction work was done under the leadership of architect August Birkhans. Building plans were completely redrawn. The overlooking tower was heightened, the terrace around the building was expanded and a new balcony was added to the second floor. Inside, a new modern-age interior design was installed. It became the most notable example of national modern design in the Baltic region. Many famous artists of that time such as Niklāvs Strunke, Pēteris Ozoliņš, Kārlis Sūniņš, and Vilhelms Vasariņš took part in creating it. Pictures of the castle were found in French art magazines as the press at the time would report. The Writers Castle became a popular visitor's destination after the renovation.

In 1938, the monument of Atis Kronvalds, made by Teodors Zalkalns, was unveiled at the front of the New Castle. Atis Kronvalds was a teacher and a publicist and helped initiate the second wave of the New Latvian movement.

During World War II, the New Castle was used as a headquarters for the Nord division of the German army. After the war, the USSR Council of Ministers made it a recreation house for high state officials. In 1953, the Health Department of the Latvian SSR established the Sigulda rehabilitation center which was in operation until the restoration of Latvian independence.

From 1993 through 2002, the New Castle held the Sigulda City council and then, beginning in 2003, the Sigulda District Council.

Next to the New Castle, there is a yellow house called the Summer Castle. It was built at the turn of the 18th or 19th century in the style of classicism. The elongated wooden house was built by a master-builder from Cēsis, a man called the last of the Livs of Vidzeme, Mārcis Sārums. Kropotkin's family initially used the building as a personal orthodox church after the completion of the New Castle in 1881. Services were held by the orthodox priest of Ledurga parish. The building also came under reconstruction when the Writers and Journalists Union obtained ownership and remodelled it to become a boarding-house.

An art gallery was installed in the former brewery of Sigulda manor.

== Gallery ==
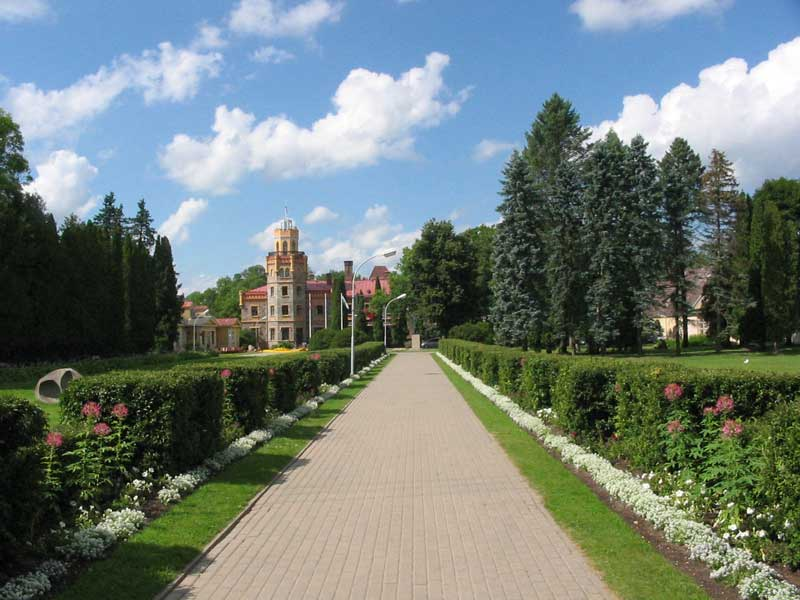
Sigulda Castle garden

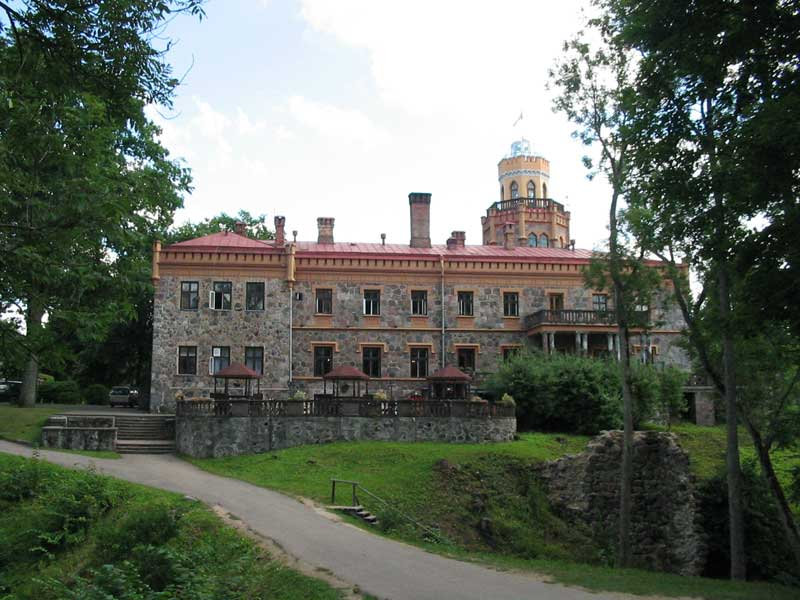
Backside of Sigulda Castle

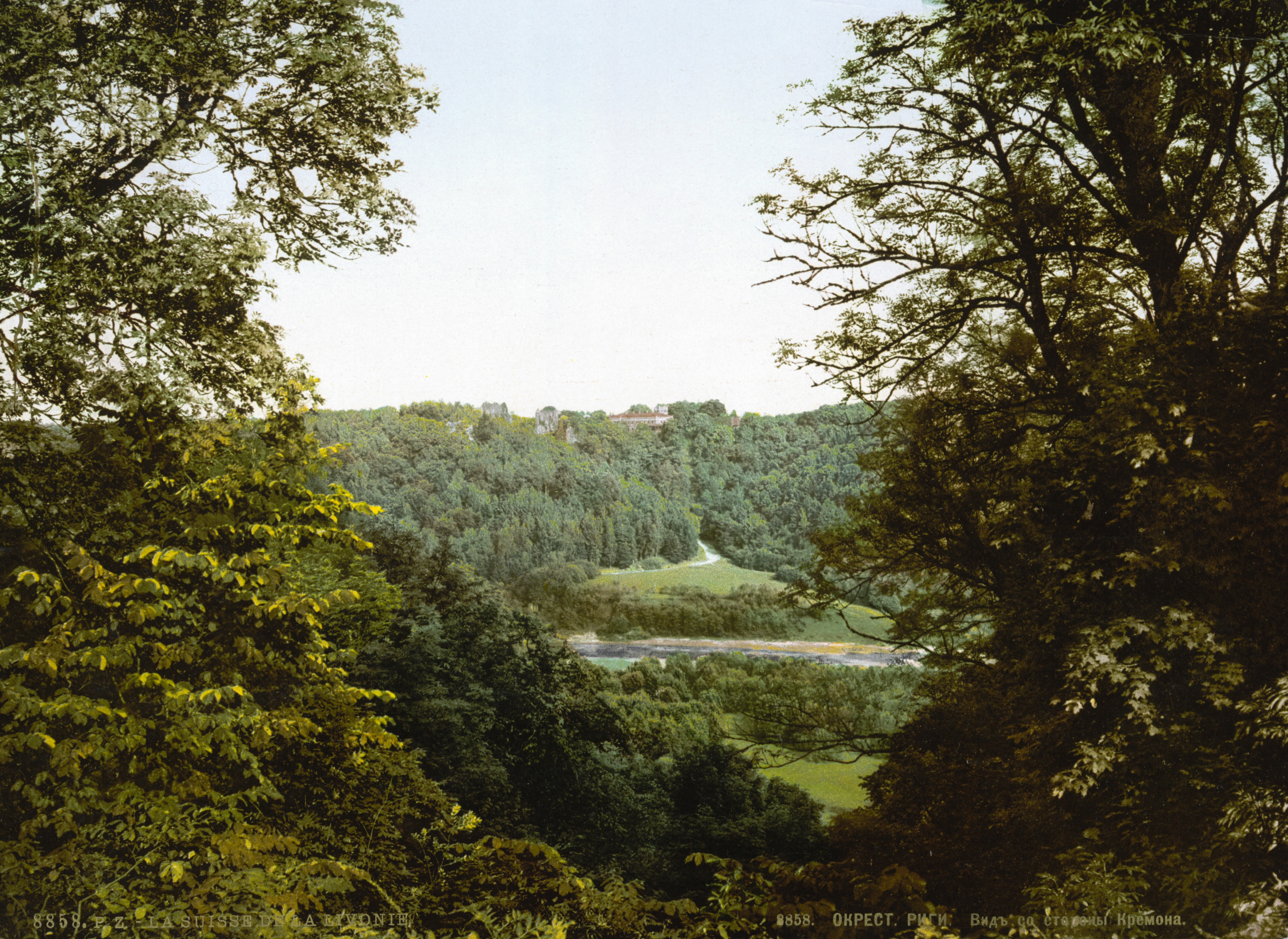
View of Sigulda Castle over the Gauja River

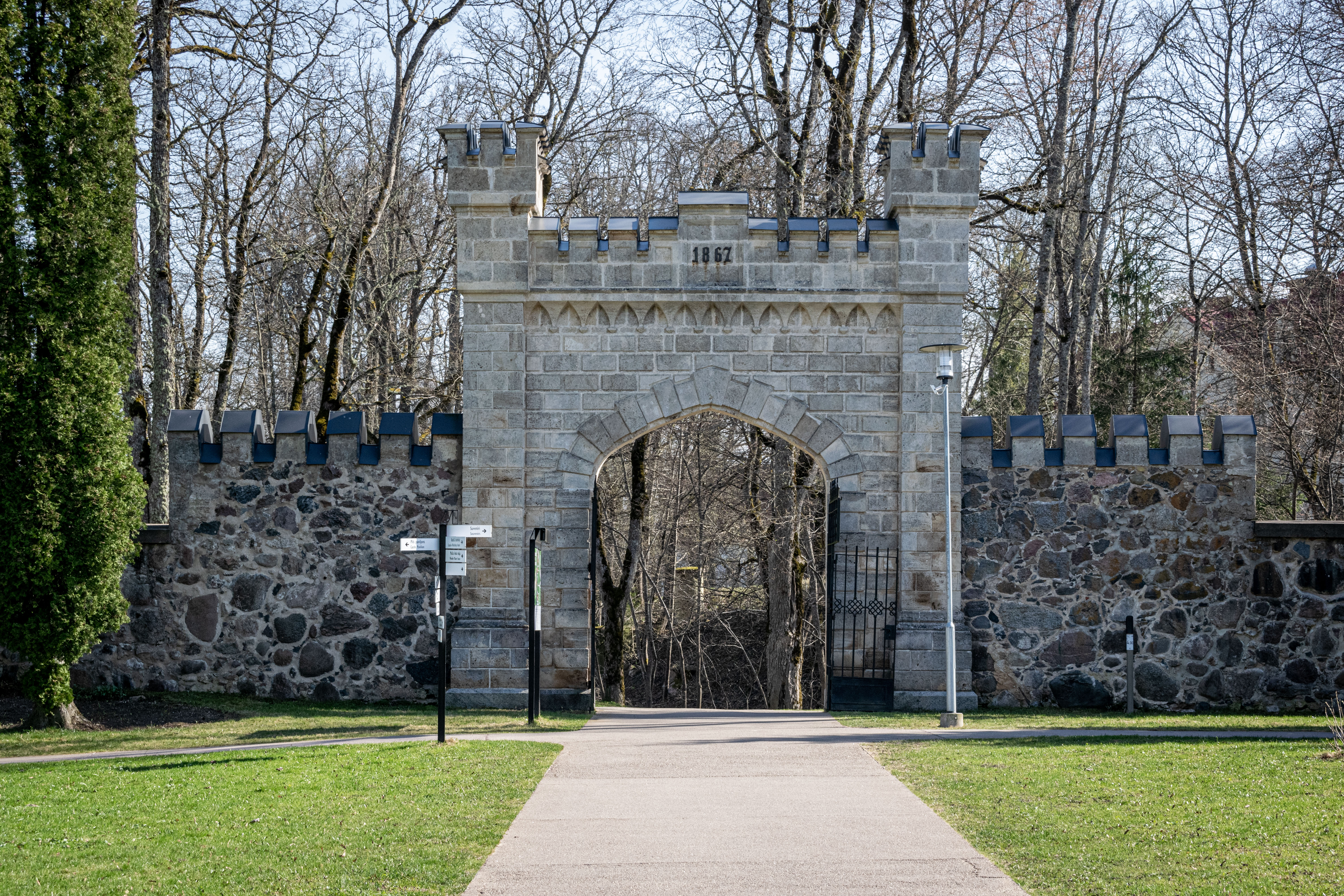
Gates of Sigulda Castle

== See also ==
- Turaida Castle
- Krimulda Castle
- Sigulda Medieval Castle
