= Krimulda Castle =

Castle in Latvia

- Krimuldas pils
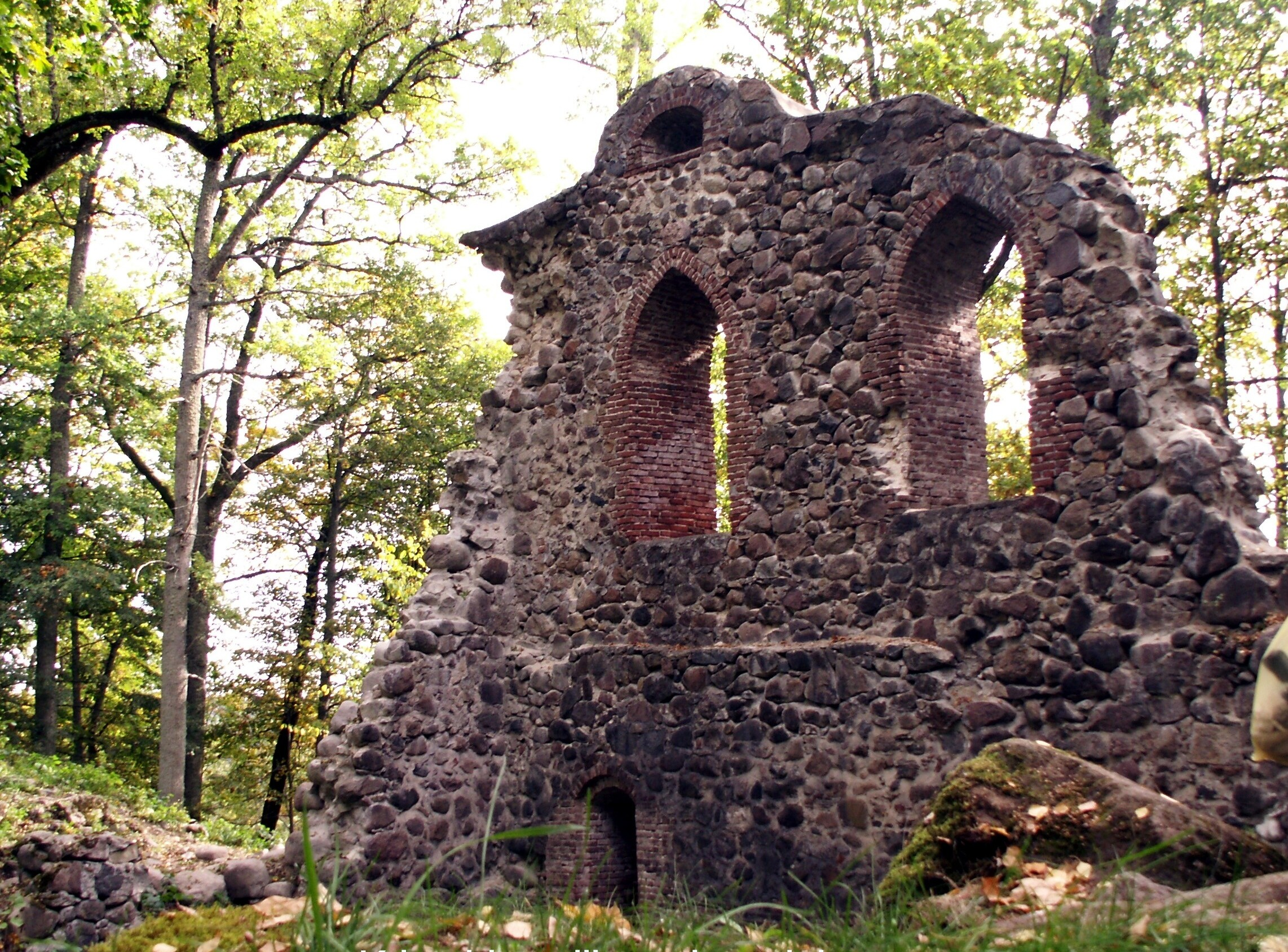

Site information
- Condition: Ruins

Location
- Coordinates: 57.170936°N 24.832058°E

Site history
- Built: 14th century
- Built by: Riga High Council
- Demolished: 1601

The Krimulda Castle (German: Burg Kremon) is located just outside Sigulda, Sigulda Municipality in the Vidzeme region of Latvia and is a tourist attraction. The castle dates from the 14th century and was destroyed in a war in 1601. Prince Liven's living house was built in the classic style. The manor complex consists of steward's house, coach house, Swiss cottage, etc. Home wine tasting is available by prior arrangement.

== History ==
During the 13th century, the left bank of the Gauja river was governed by the Order of the Brethren of the Sword, (later known as the Order of Livonia), while the territories on the right bank were under the domain of the Archbishop of Riga. Krimulda castle belonged to the Riga High Council which was a group of twelve high priests who advised the archbishop.

Krimulda castle was built on the edge of a high bank on the right side of Gauja near the Vikmeste castle mound and the village of Livs. This placement made it nearly impossible to conquer. On one side it was protected by the steep valley wall of Gauja river, two additional sides were obstructed by the Vikmeste river, which had equally steep banks, and the fourth side bordered on a man-made ravine with a draw-bridge leading into the forecastle. The deep valley of the Vikmeste River also provided a natural borderline between the lands of Krimulda and Turaida.

The castle was built using large-sized boulders. The outer wall of the castle at ground level was about 2 meters/6–7 feet thick.

The castle was involved in a number of battles between the Livonian Order and the Archbishop of Riga as well as many of the later wars of Livonia. In the spring of 1601 during the Swedish-Polish war, it was conquered by the Swedish army. In the fall of that same year advancing Polish troops burned the castle down so it would not fall into the hands of the enemy. The castle was left unrepaired after the fire.

The castle regained purpose in the mid-19th century under the ownership of Prince Lieven, though not as a military fortification but as a romantic addition to a park.

== Gallery ==
Krimulda Castle ruins in 2014.

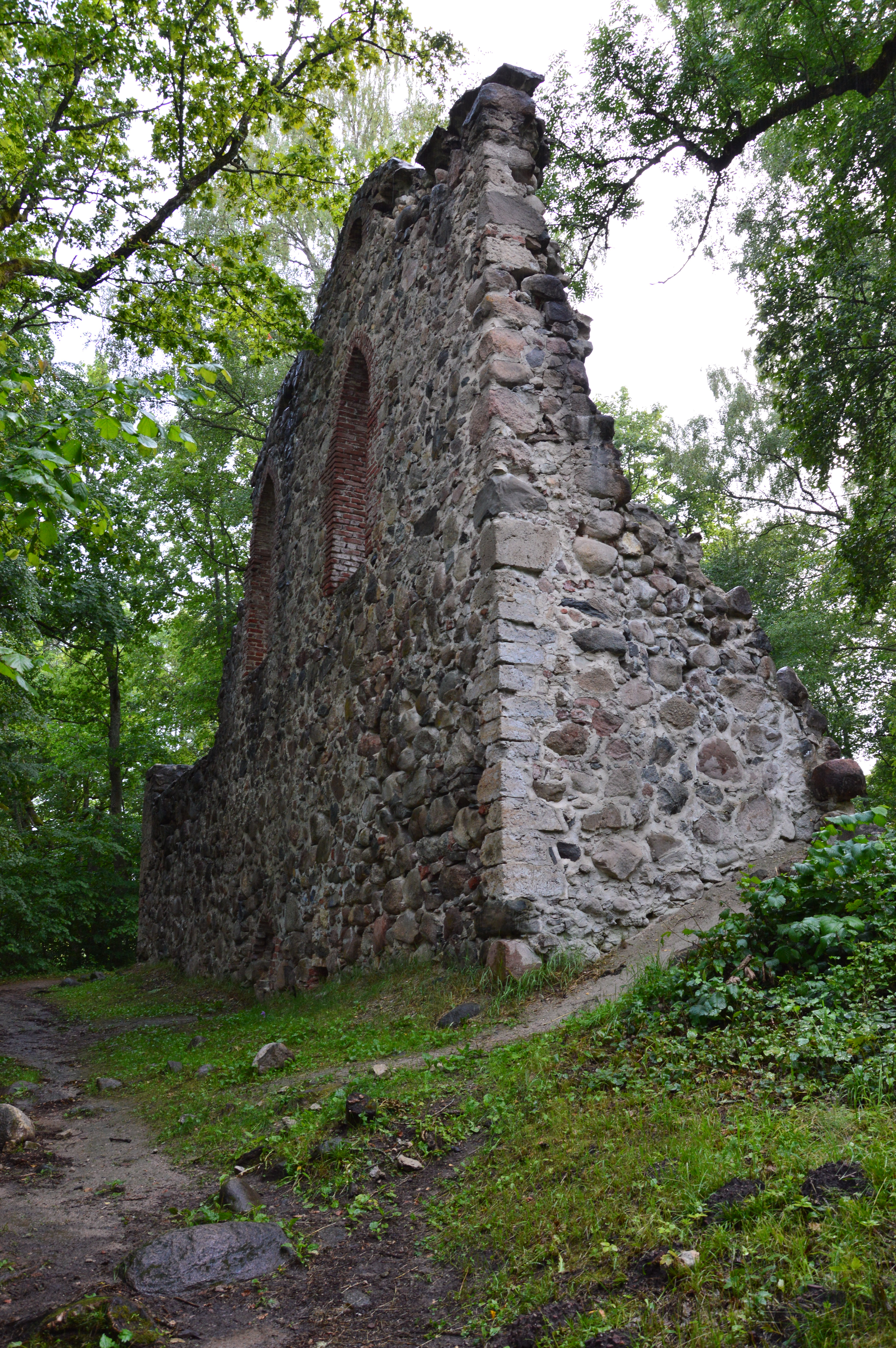

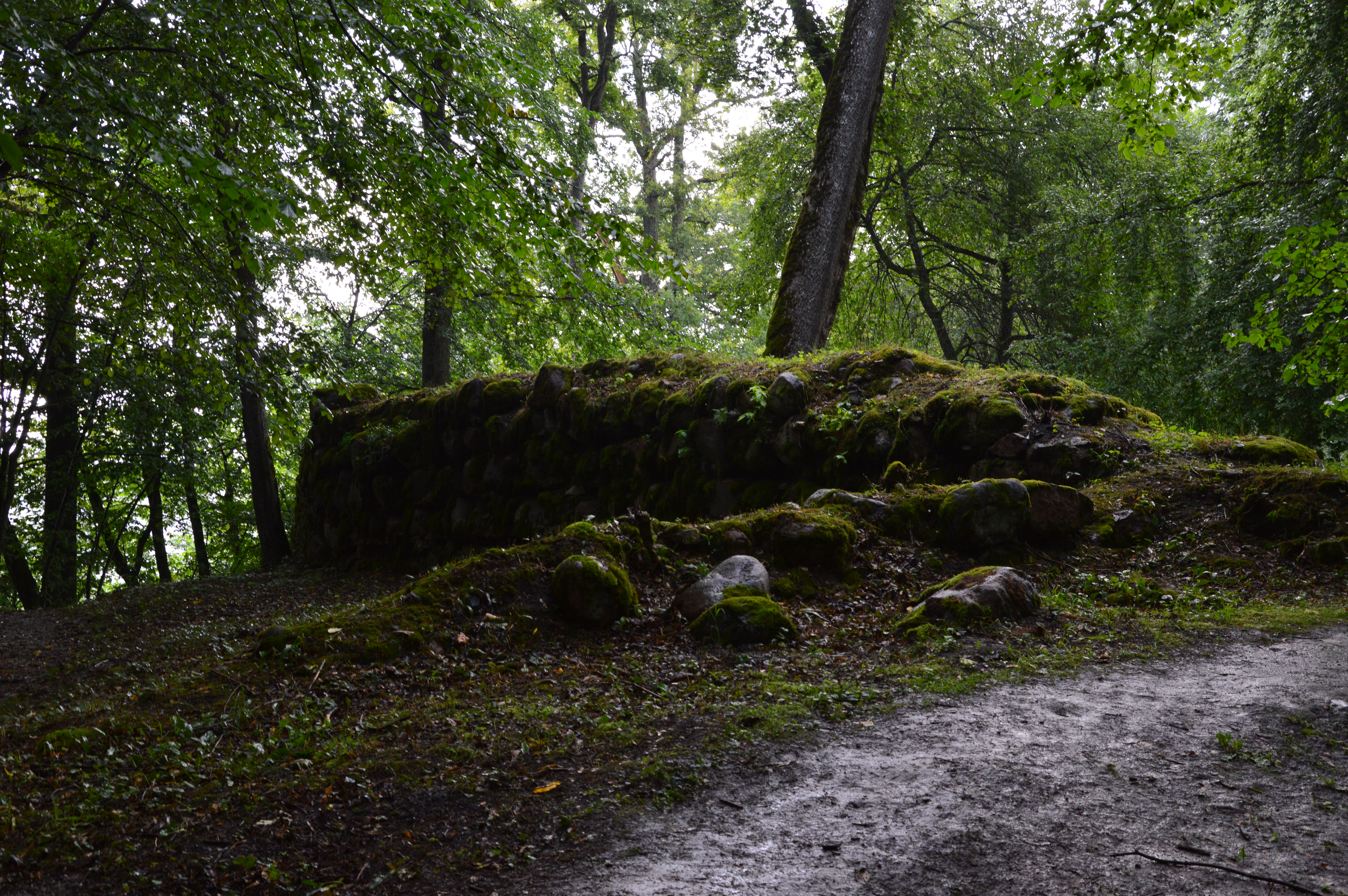

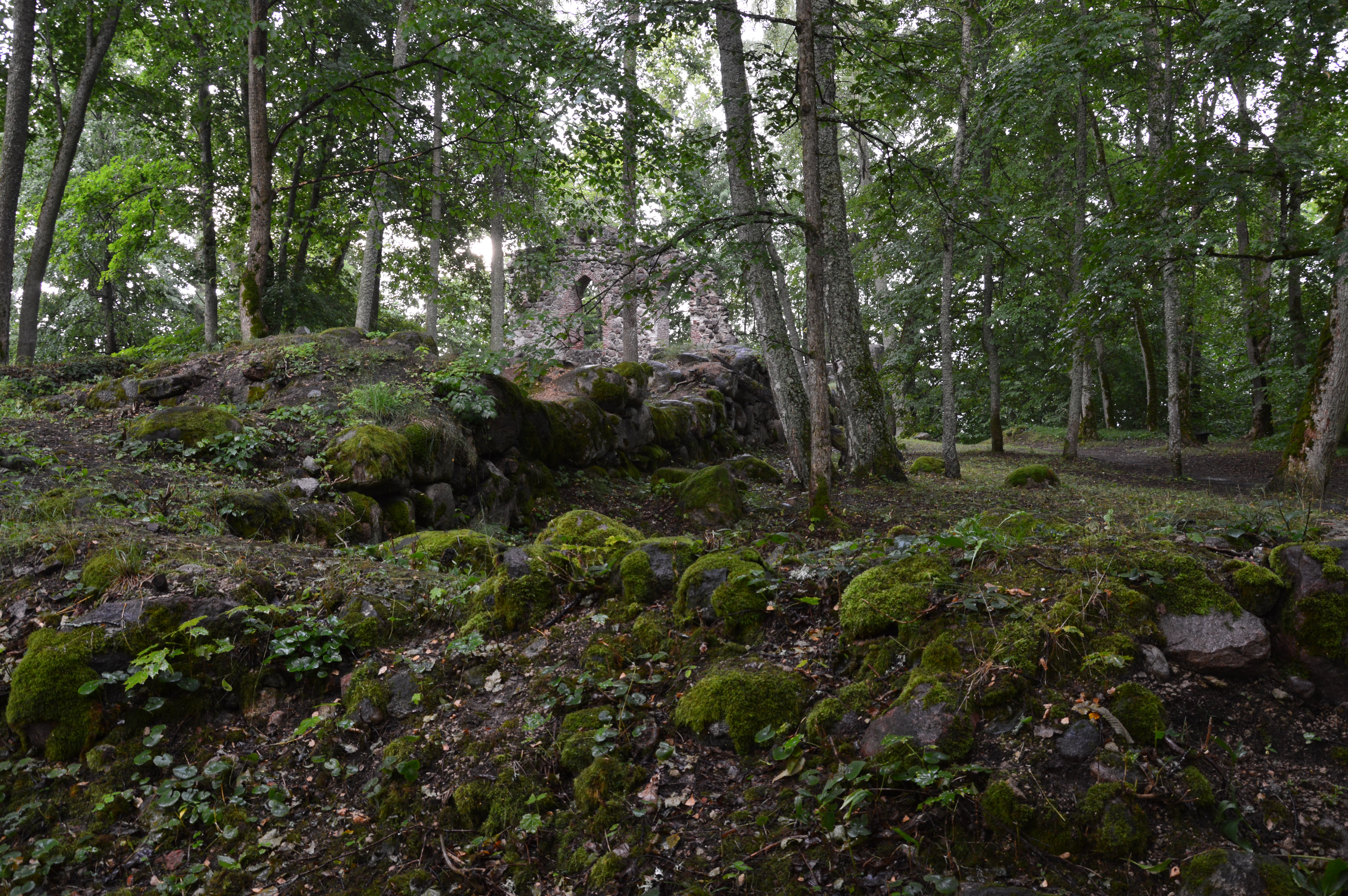

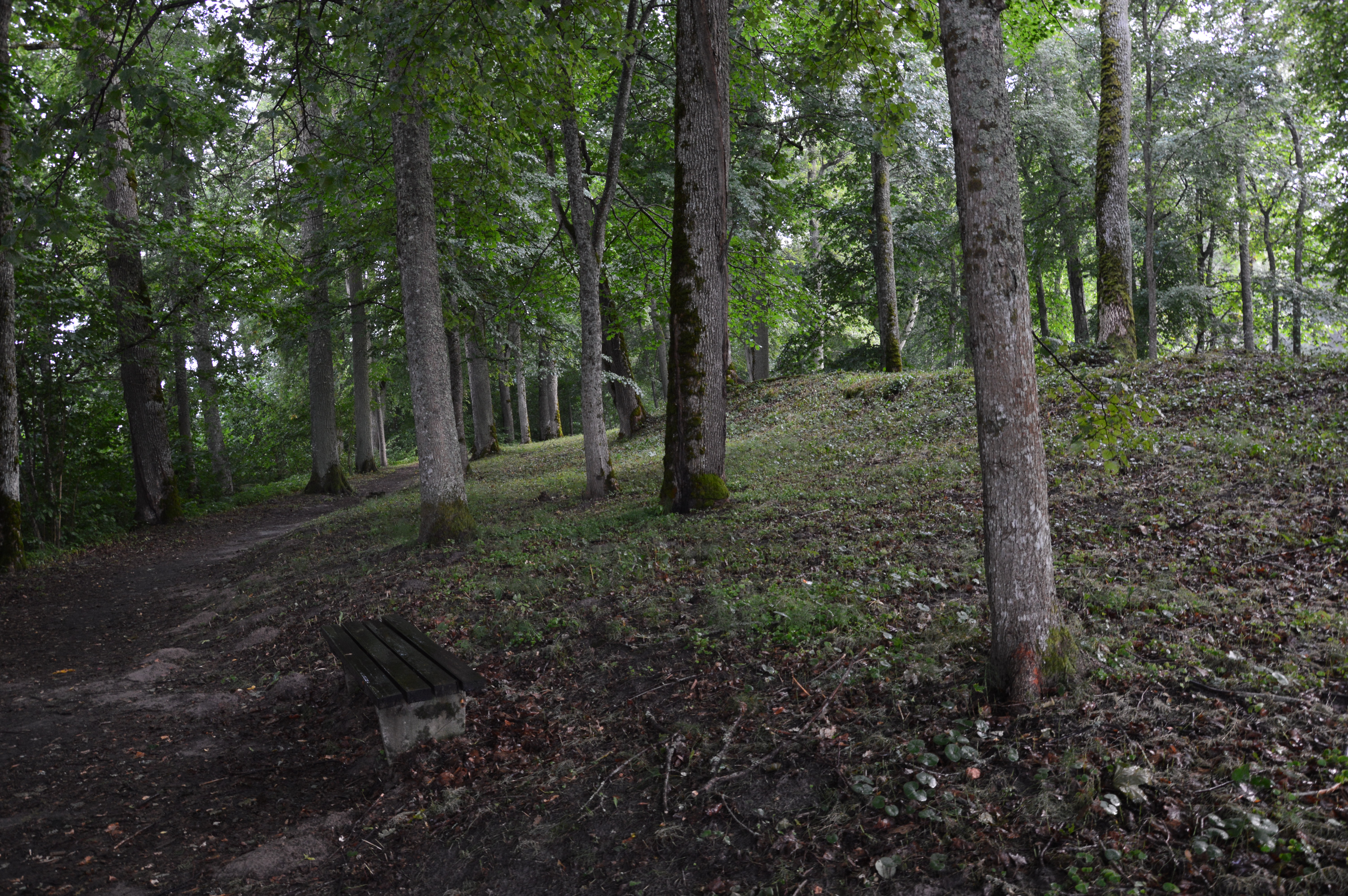

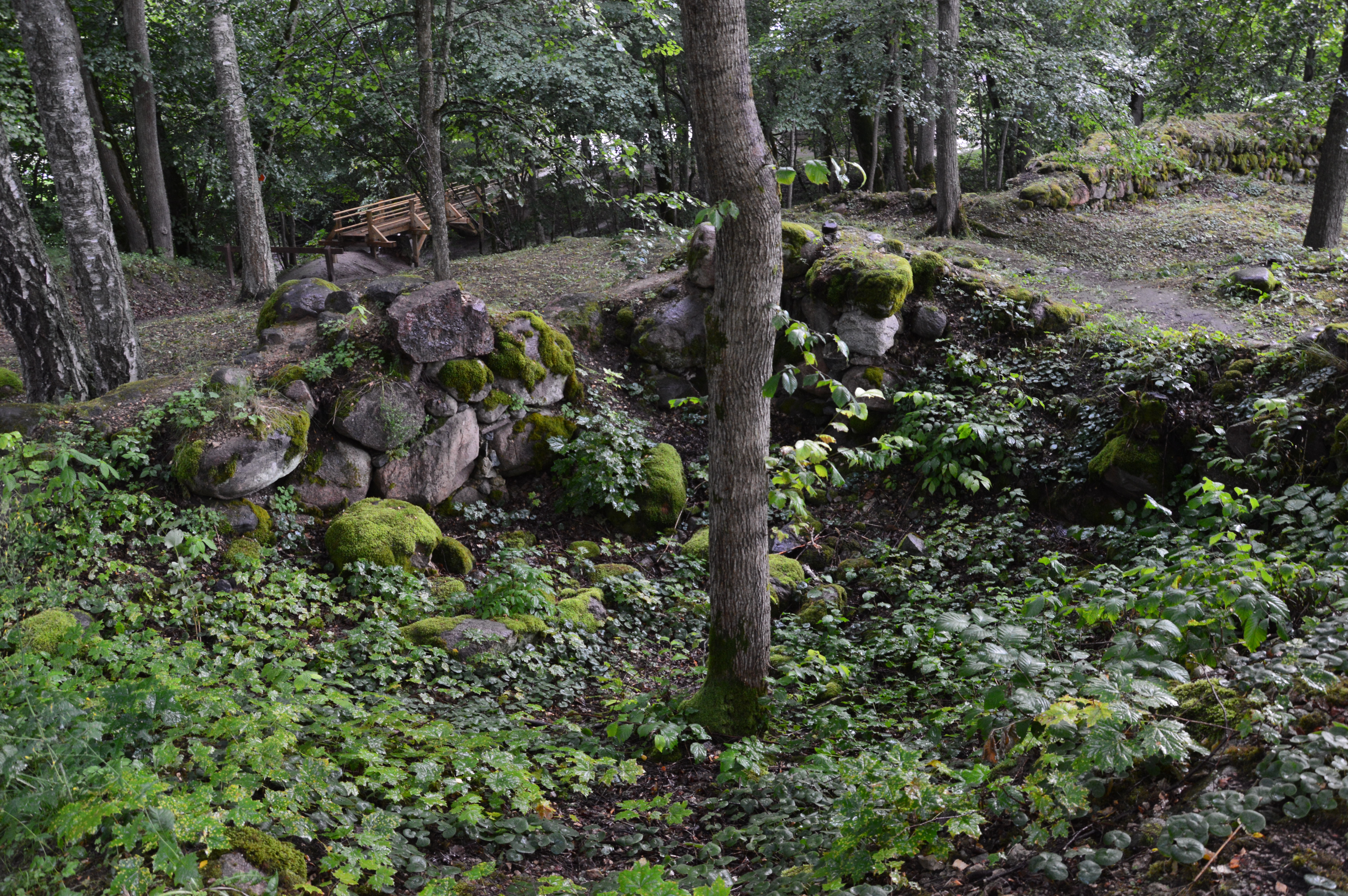

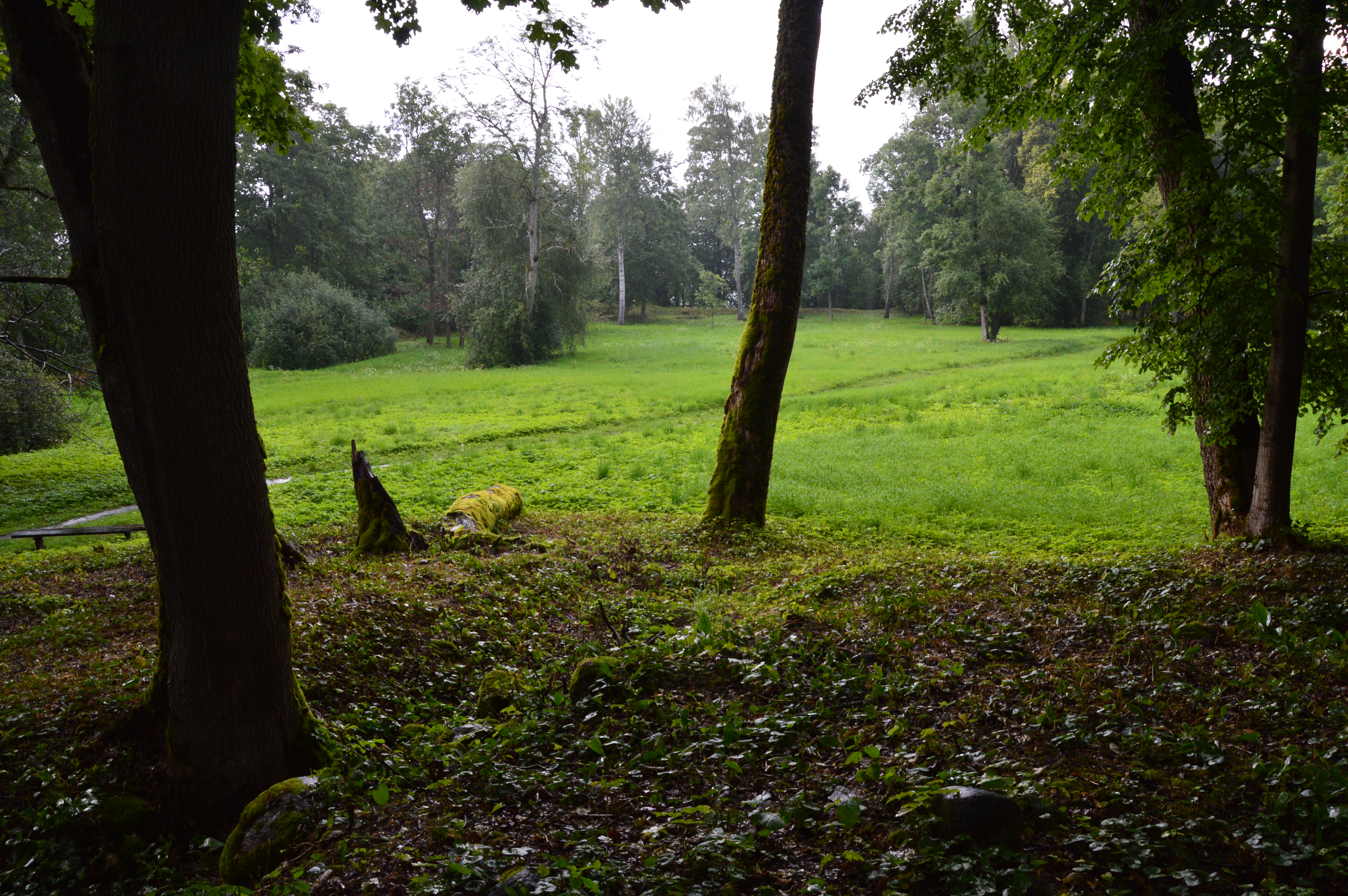

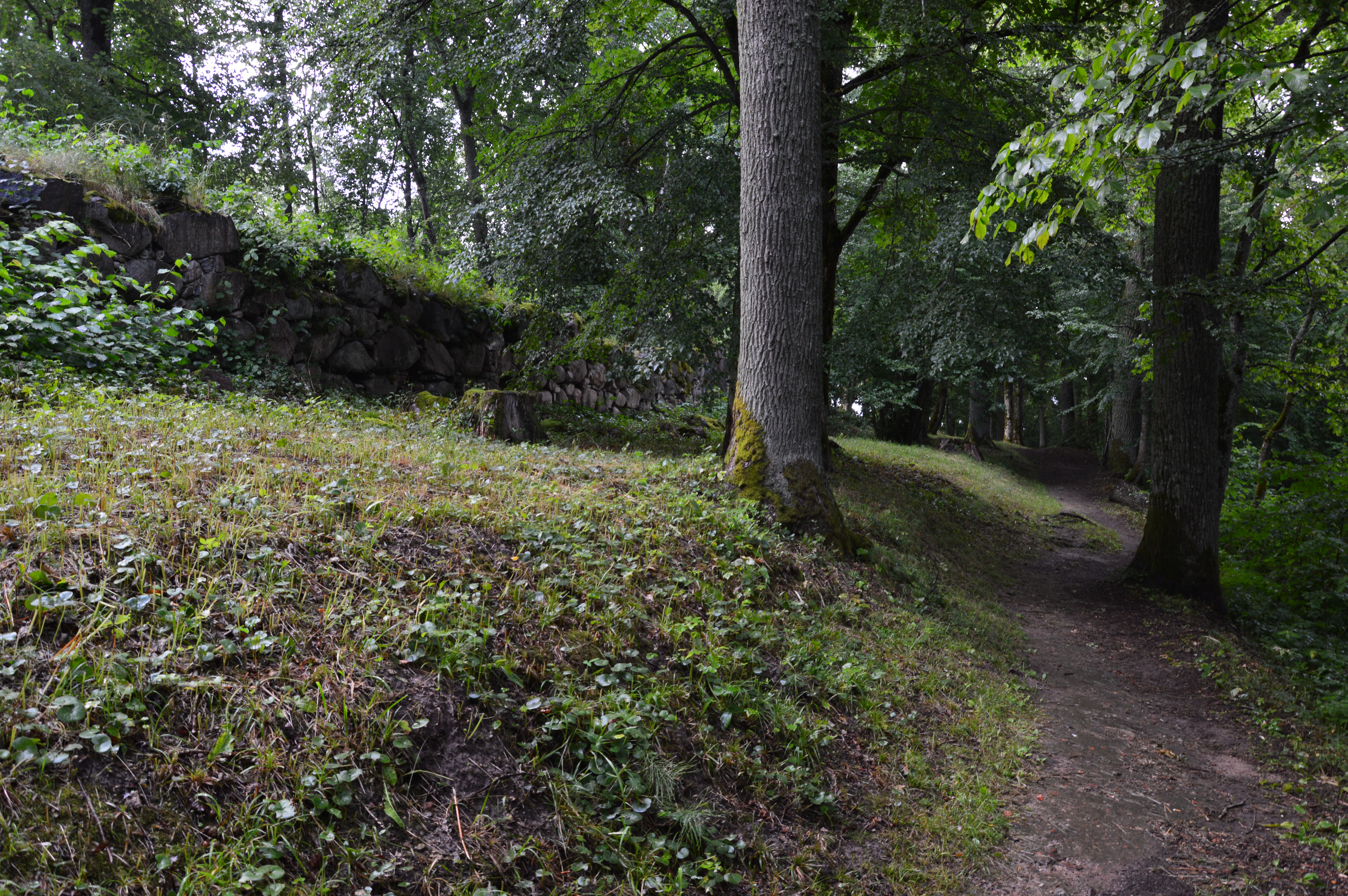

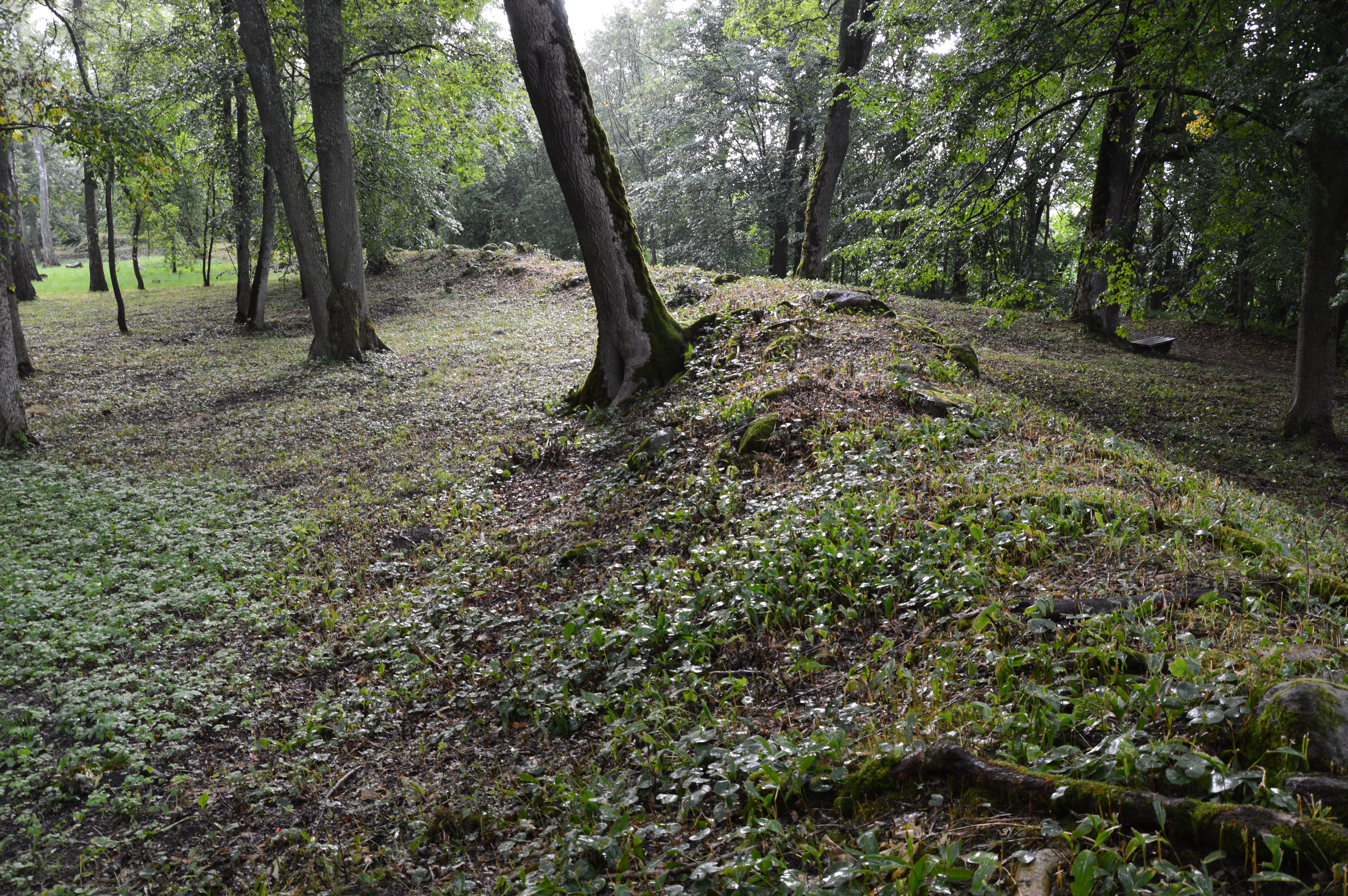

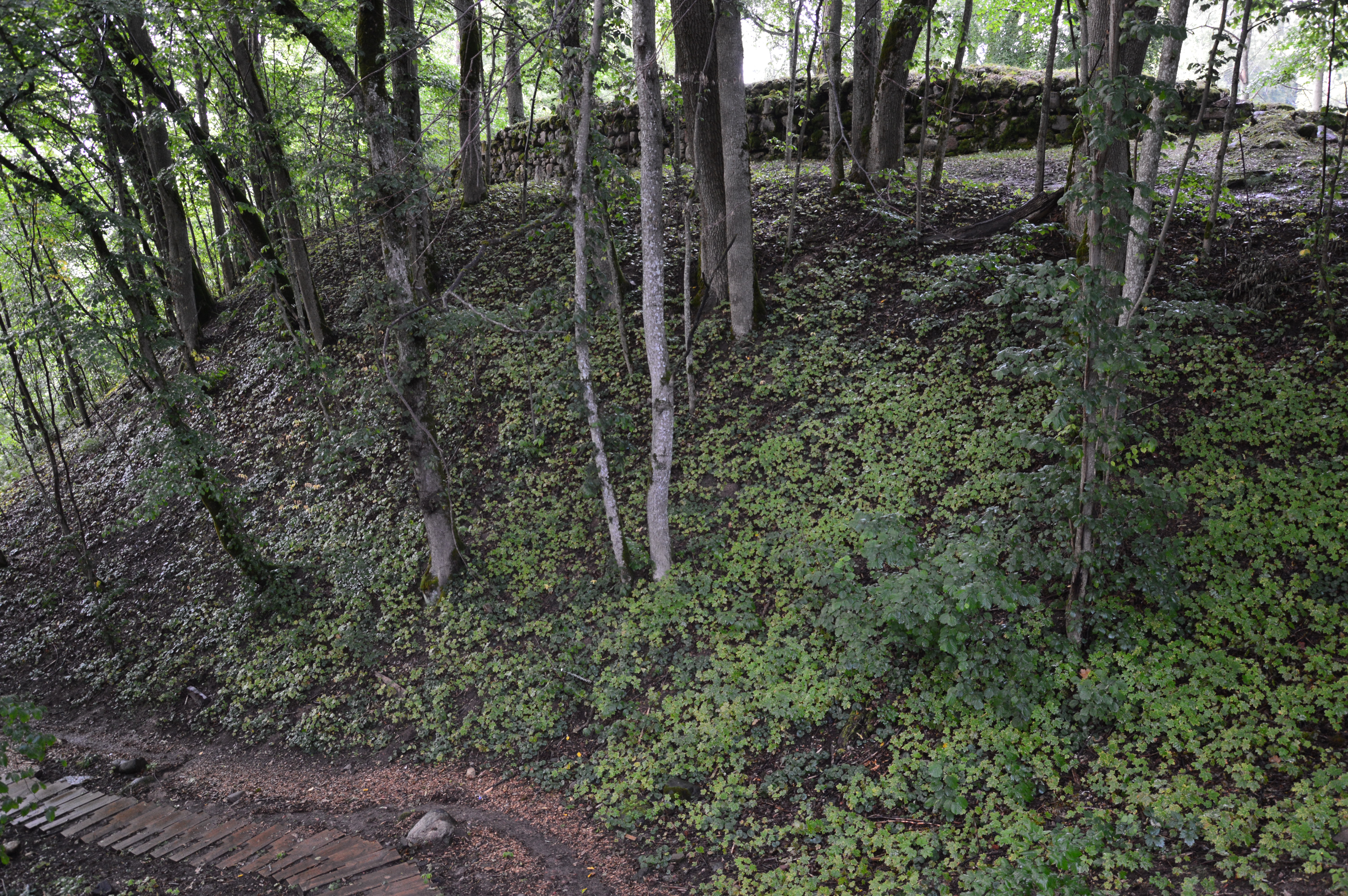

== See also ==
- List of castles in Latvia
- Sigulda Castle
- Turaida Castle
