= Turaida =

Neighbourhood of Sigulda, Latvia

Coordinates: 57.1867°N 24.8414°E

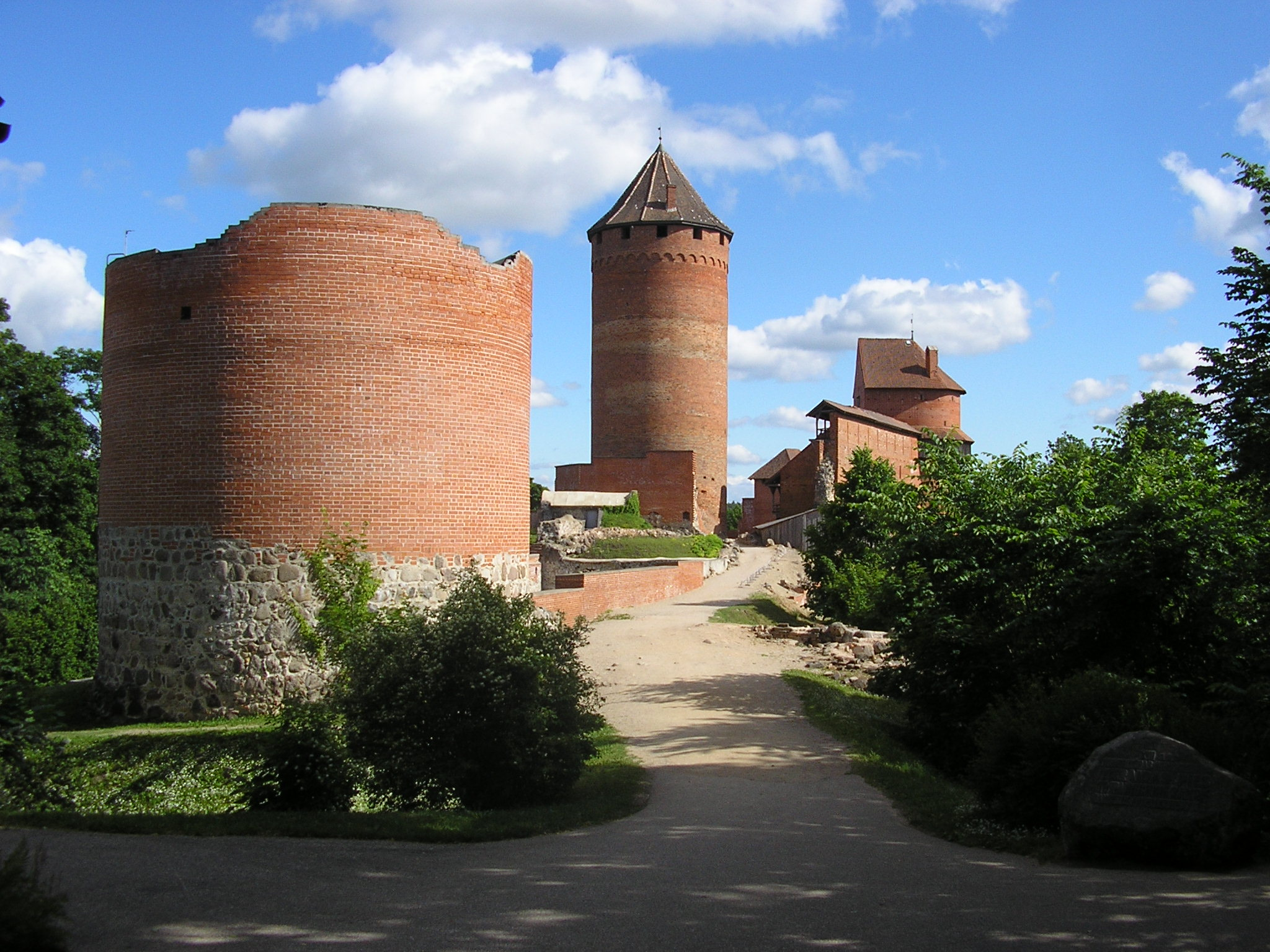
Turaida Castle from north

Turaida (Livonian: Toraid, German: Treiden, Treyden; meaning Thor's garden in Livonian) is a part of Sigulda in the Vidzeme Region of Latvia. Its most famous site is the Brick Gothic Turaida Castle.

In 1212, a peace treaty was signed in Turaida between the Estonian tribes and the Livonian Brothers of the Sword, the Archbishopric of Riga, the Livonians and the Latgalians.
