= Sigulda =

Town and capital of Sigulda Municipality, Latvia

- Town
- Flag Coat of arms

- Location in Latvia
- Coordinates: 57°09′N 24°52′E
- Country: Latvia
- District: Sigulda Municipality
- Town rights: 1928

Government
  - Mayor: Linards Kumskis

Area
  - Total: 22.88 km^{2} (8.83 sq mi)
  - Land: 22.05 km^{2} (8.51 sq mi)
  - Water: 0.83 km^{2} (0.32 sq mi)

Population (2026)
  - Total: 14,784
  - Density: 670.5/km^{2} (1,737/sq mi)
- Time zone: UTC+2 (EET)
  - Summer (DST): UTC+3 (EEST)
- Postal code: LV-2150
- Calling code: +371 67
- Number of city council members: 15
- Website: sigulda.lv/public/eng/

Sigulda (German: Segewold; Polish: Zygwold) is a town and the centre of Sigulda Municipality in the Vidzeme region of Latvia, 53 kilometres (33 miles) from the capital city Riga. It's an important tourist center of Latvia. Its territory also includes the ancient centers of Turaida and Krimulda. At the beginning of 2024, Sigulda had 14,632 inhabitants, making it the 15th largest settlement in Latvia.

== Overview ==
Sigulda is on a picturesque stretch of the primeval Gauja river valley. Because of the reddish Devonian sandstone which forms steep rocks and caves on both banks of the river, Sigulda has been called the "Switzerland of Vidzeme".

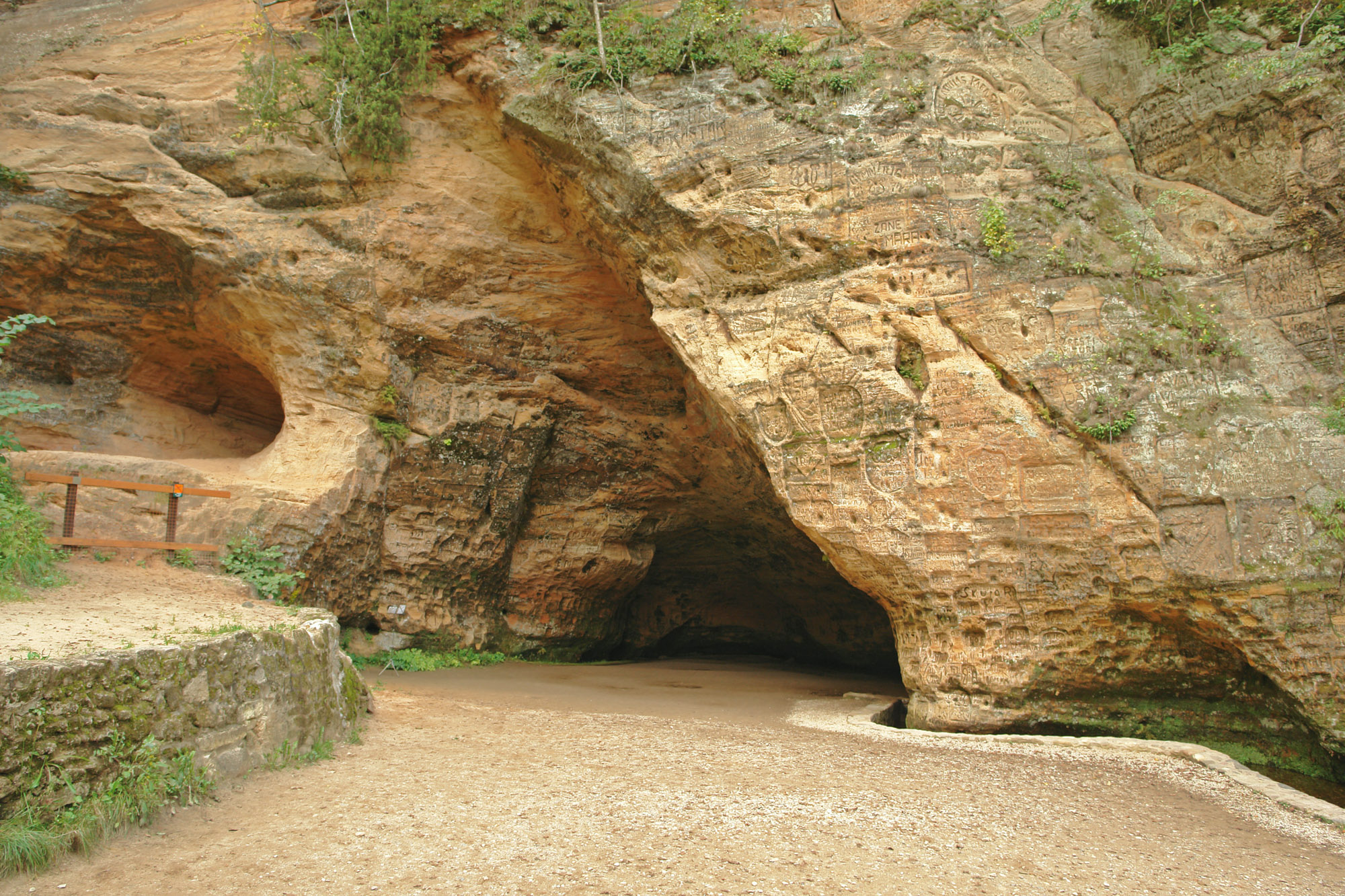
Gutman's Cave

After the restoration of Latvian independence in 1991, an emphasis was placed on conserving Sigulda's public monuments and parks as well as improving the town's tourist sector. Supported by the town council, a traditional Opera Festival takes place in an open-air music hall in the castle ruins each summer. A Town Festival is celebrated in May when cherry trees blossom, while Sigulda is known for the colors of its trees in autumn. Sports such as skiing, bobsledding, and the luge are popular in wintertime and bungee jumping is practiced during the rest of the year.

Gutman's Cave lies halfway between Sigulda Castle and Turaida Castle and has a small stream flowing from it. It is the largest cave in the Baltics, measuring 19 m (62.34 ft) deep, 12 m (39.37 ft) wide and 10 m (32.81 ft) high. The cave still bears inscriptions from as early as the 17th century; drinking the water is supposed to be healthy and is said to increase one's lifespan. From the cave it is possible to climb into the hills and take the cable car over the river valley.

The town's population has been growing every year since 2000. 86% of the population is Latvian, 9% Russian, 3% Belarusian and 2% others. Sigulda celebrated its 800th anniversary in 2007.

== Points of interest ==
- Aerodium Latvia
- Gauja National Park
- Gutmanis Cave
- Krimulda Castle
- Sigulda bobsleigh, luge, and skeleton track
- Sigulda Castle
- Sigulda Medieval Castle
- Turaida Castle
- Paradise Hill

== Twin towns – sister cities ==
Sigulda is a member of the Douzelage, a town twinning association of towns across the European Union. This active town twinning began in 1991 and there are regular events, such as a produce market from each of the other countries and festivals. As of 2019, its members are:

- Agros, Cyprus
- Altea, Spain
- Asikkala, Finland
- Bad Kötzting, Germany
- Bellagio, Italy
- (Republic of Ireland) Bundoran, Ireland
- Chojna, Poland
- Granville, France
- Holstebro, Denmark
- Houffalize, Belgium
- Judenburg, Austria
- Kőszeg, Hungary
- Marsaskala, Malta
- Meerssen, Netherlands
- Niederanven, Luxembourg
- Oxelösund, Sweden
- Preveza, Greece
- Rokiškis, Lithuania
- Rovinj, Croatia
- Sesimbra, Portugal
- Sherborne, England, United Kingdom
- Siret, Romania
- Škofja Loka, Slovenia
- Sušice, Czech Republic
- Tryavna, Bulgaria
- Türi, Estonia
- Zvolen, Slovakia

Other twinnings

- Angus, Scotland, United Kingdom
- Birštonas, Lithuania
- (Georgia (country)) Chiatura, Georgia
- Chocz, Poland
- Falköping, Sweden
- Keila, Estonia
- Stuhr, Germany
- Vesthimmerland, Denmark

== Notable people ==
- Jānis Straume (1962–2024), politician; the fourth Speaker of the Saeima, 1998 to 2002
- Agris Daņiļevičs (born 1963), choreographer and dance teacher.
- Anda Čakša (born 1974), politician, paediatrician

=== Sport ===
- Alfrēds Ruks (1890–1941), middle-distance runner, competed at the 1912 & 1924 Summer Olympics
- Milda Lauberte (1918-2009), chess player
- Alvis Vītoliņš (1946-1997), chess master
- Juris Šics (born 1983), luger, team silver medallist in the 2010 Winter Olympics
- Martins Dukurs (born 1984), skeleton racer, a double silver winner at 2010 and 2014 Winter Olympics
- Mihails Arhipovs (born 1984), bobsledder, skeleton coach, competed in two Winter Olympic Games
- Andris Šics (born 1985), luger, team silver medallist in the 2010 Winter Olympics
- Jānis Strenga (born 1986), bobsledder, team gold medallist in the 2014 Winter Olympics
- Elīza Tīruma (born 1990), luger, team bronze medallist in the 2014 Winter Olympics
- Toms Skujiņš (born 1991), cyclist
- Kristers Aparjods (born 1998), luger, team bronze medallist in the 2022 Winter Olympics
- Mārtiņš Bots (born 1999), luger, team bronze medallist in the 2022 Winter Olympics
- Elīna Ieva Bota (born 2000), luger, silver medallist in the 2026 Winter Olympics
