= Turaida Castle =

Building

- Vidzeme, Turaida, Latvia
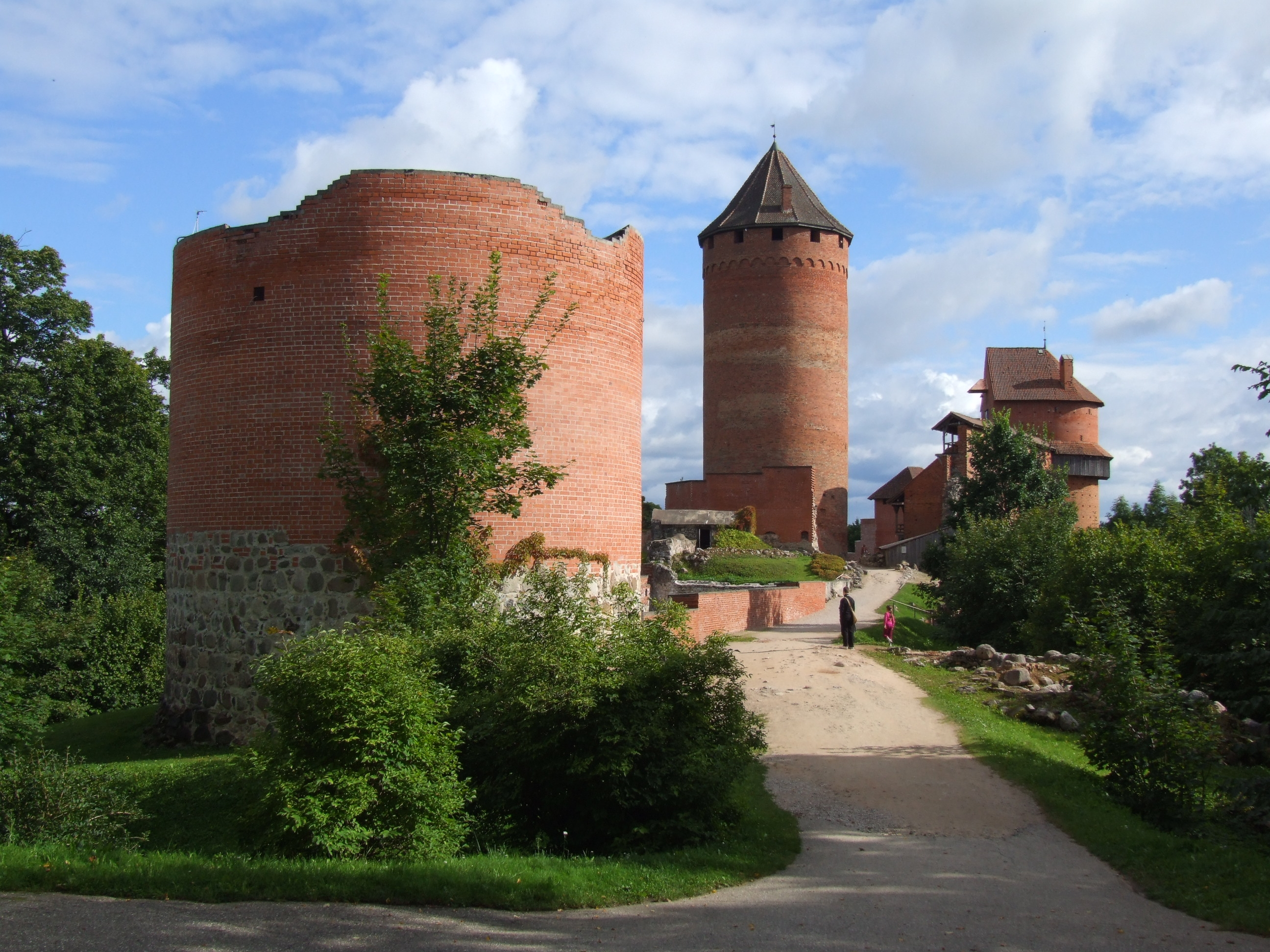

Site information
- Type: Castle
- Condition: Partly restored

Location
- Location within Latvia
- Coordinates: 57°10′56″N 24°51′01″E

Site history
- Built: 1214
- Built by: Livonian Brothers of the Sword
- In use: Abandoned in 1776

Turaida Castle (Latvian: Turaidas pils, German: Treiden, Treyden; meaning Thor's garden in Livonian) is a recently reconstructed medieval castle in Turaida, in the Vidzeme region of Latvia, on the opposite bank of the Gauja River from Sigulda.

== History ==
Turaida Castle dominates the Museum Reserve and is visually its most impressive element. When seen from the air, or the opposite bank of the river Gauja in Sigulda, Turaida castle can be seen rising above the treeline. From this view, the forepart of the castle is formed by the northern forecastle's gate tower. The main tower which is the highest is situated centrally, and the rear view forms the southern forecastle with its tower shaped southern section.

Construction of the castle was started in 1214 upon directions given by Albert, Archbishop of Riga to his Livonian Brothers of the Sword (soon to merge with the Teutonic Order) at the place where the wooden castle of Livonians had previously stood. A castellum type fortress was built and named Fredeland, which translates as 'Land of Peace,' but became better known locally by the Livonian name of Turaida, which has survived until the present day. The castle was constructed largely in the classic red-brick construction of the Baltic crusading orders. Improving the castle's defensive system continued in later centuries, and in the 14th century, the tower shaped southern section was built; at the beginning of the 15th century, when firearms were invented, the semi rounded western tower was built. Domestic buildings and living accommodation were also erected in the inner yard of the castle. Minor reconstruction work was carried out in 17th century although the castle started to lose its strategic importance. After a fire in 1776 it was abandoned and gradually became ruinous.

By the beginning of the 20th century, only separate fragments of the defensive wall and some buildings – the main tower, semi-rounded tower and the western section – were left. From 1976 regular archaeological excavations were carried out which were followed by restoration and conservation works revealing the castle's earlier state. Exhibitions about the history of the brick castle and the Gauja Livonians are available in the restored buildings. From the viewing place of the main tower it is possible to see the unique landscape of the picturesque Gauja valley and the territory of the Turaida Museum Reserve.

== Baliffs (Vogt) of Turaida Castle ==
The office of the Bailiff (Vogt), which was subordinate to the spiritual sovereign, was of great importance in the secular administration of the Archbishopric of Riga. While there is little information about the construction of these fortifications, while there is considerable evidence of hereditary Bailiwicks and fiefdoms belonging to the vassal families von Rosen and von Tiesenhausen, much of the 13th/14th century can only be assumed.

In the 15th/16th centuries, these Bailiffs (Vogts) were the most influential secular officials. The bailiff received Archiepiscopal domains as part of the income as compensation for the administration of the bailiwick. Of the few vassal families of the Archdiocese, von Rosen and von Tiesenhausen built 11 castles.

The castle and the feudal estate of Rosenbeck are a good example for how the status and resources of the Bailiwick (Vogteiamt) becomes an instrument for increasing status. In 1518 the castle went for a considerable price sum of money to the bailiff Georg Krüdener. As of 1535 the family's coat of arms was confirmed to be this possession is important for elevation to the nobility to legitimize.

- 1207 Gotfridus
- 1210/1211 Engelbertus de Tisenhusen
- 1212–1219 Gerhardus
- ca. 1231 –1253 Heydenricus
- 1257 Ludolfus
- 1272 Albero
- 1290?–1322 Johannes de Palo
- 1298† Otto de Rosen
- ca. 1330 Meynardus
- 1360/1361 Bartholomäus von Tisenhusen
- 1371–1372 Hinrik Orges
- ca. 1380 Hinrik Salcze
- 1382–1385 Bernardus Goes
- 1392 Woldemarus de Rosen
- 1403–1405? Heinrich Aderkas
- 1417–1420 Brandt Ko-skul
- 1422–1424 Johann Wildenberg
- 1427 Otto von Rosen
- 1428–1431 Georg Gudesleff
- 1444–1455 Rotger van Backem
- 1457–1461 Peter von der Borch
- 1466–1468 Wolmar Uxkull
- 1477 Kersten von Rosen
- 1496–1514 Kersten von Rosen
- 1514–1534 Georg Krüdener
- 1537–1547 Georg von Rosen zur Nab-be
- 1548–1554 Johann von der Pale zur Sepkull
- 1554–1556 Georg Taube
- 1560–1563/1566 Andreas Koskul

== Battles of Turaida ==
The Battle of Turaida (1211) was one of the biggest battles of the Livonian crusade between Estonian tribes and Livonian Brothers of the Sword. The battle took place around modern Turaida, Latvia.

The Battle of Turaida (1298) or Treiden (also known as the Battle on Aa) was fought on June 1, 1298, on the banks of the Gauja River (German: Livländische Aa) near the Turaida Castle (Treiden). The Livonian Order was decisively defeated by the residents of Riga allied with the Grand Duchy of Lithuania under command of Vytenis.

== Summary ==
By the end of the 13th century, the territory of the Archbishopric of Riga, like that of the other bishoprics of Livonia, had become stable. For nearly three centuries, the Archbishop, along with his cathedral chapter, governed the approximately 400 square kilometer territory. As a secular lord, the Archbishop had the authority to manage the land reserves, establish towns, and mint currency, among other things.

The representative of the Archbishop in a secular trial was the bailiff or land-bailiff ((Latin: advocatus, German: voget, Stiftvogt, Landvogt etc.). Generally, land-bailiffs were administrators who collected taxes, claimed duties, and administered the law in a specific territory under the authorization of the spiritual territorial Lord Archbishop of Riga. They were responsible for concluding agreements and organizing the defense of the land. Additionally, they were required for the construction and reconstruction of the Archbishop's castles. Bailiffs were vassals, appointed for a certain period.

In the Archbishopric of Riga, there were multiple bailiffs simultaneously working in their respective administrative territories. The territorial changes in the administrative districts of the Riga bishopric between 1201 and 1253/1255 document the organization of land administration in areas inhabited by Livonians, starting from 1207. Initially, the boundaries of administrative districts were based on pre-existing territorial divisions established before the conquest of crusaders. As new castles were constructed, they became the administrative centers. During the 13th to 15th centuries, the bailiffs' districts in Ydumea and Lielvārde (Lenewarden) ceased to exist. However, for a brief period in the 15th century, Rauna (Ronneburg) emerged as a bailiwick.

The stone castle of Turaida (also known as Treyden, Thoreida, and built in 1214) maintained its position as the center of the bailiwick for an extended period until the secularization of the Archbishopric in 1566. The origins of the Turaida bailiwick can be traced back to the early 13th century when this territory was part of the Livonian-inhabited Bishopric of Riga. In the first half of the 16th century, the bailiwick expanded to include some of the Latvian-inhabited castle districts. Koknese (also known as Kokenhusen and built since 1209) is mentioned as a bailiwick at the end of the 13th century and maintained its status as the center of the bailiwick until the Coadjutors' war of 1556-1557.

The seals of the Turaida and Koknese bailiffs, which were issued under the authorization of the Archbishop, featured a heraldic symbol of the Archbishopric of Riga - a long bishop's cross and a staff with inscriptions: "sigillum advocati toreiden" and "sigillum advocati kokenhůszen." These seals acknowledged the bailiffs' work and authority in the 15th/16th century.

Medieval Livonia

However, the aristocracy that governed the bailiwick as an inheritable fief did not emerge from the Riga archbishopric. Instead, some vassal families, such as the von Rosen and von Tiesenhausen families, began to form a community in the 13th-14th century, with their fief possessions and bailiwicks eventually becoming the foundation for the Baltic German aristocracy which lasted nearly 8 centuries Bolshevik Revolution in 1917, Latvia declared independence soon after.

The powerful ecclesiastical lords of Livonia sought to curtail the influence of the secular knights in their territories, and they were successful in the Archbishopric of Riga. The position of land-bailiff was particularly esteemed in the 14th century, when the Archbishops of Riga had conflicts with the Teutonic Order and often resided outside of Livonia. The use of fiefs for service allowed the bailiffs to significantly increase their wealth and prestige, ensuring a steady income and strengthening their position.

Disputes over Koknese Castle between the territorial lord and the vassals von Tiesenhausen lasted nearly half a century, until 1397, when the castle was eventually gained by the territorial ruler. As a result, the centers of the bailiwicks in the 15th/16th century were stone castles and domains owned by the Archbishop.

The local knighthood, including land bailiffs, played a significant role in the administration and domestic policy of the Archbishopric of Riga. The Archbishop of Riga granted special joint-property rights, known as "Gesamthand Recht," to the most powerful vassal families of the archbishopric, including the von Rosens, who received their fief in 1350/1428 the von Tiesenhausens in 1417, the von Ungerns in 1455 and the von Üxkülls in 1477. These fiefs allowed the families to govern large fief districts for several centuries and act as territorial lords, granting fiefs to their sub-vassals and building stone and brick castles.

The former bailiwick of Ydumea saw castles spring up on the properties of the von Rosens: Augstroze (Rosen, Hochrosen, 1350), Lielstraupe (Gross-Roop, before 1310), Rozbeķi (Rosenbeck, ca. 1372–1395), Mazstraupe (Klein-Roop, ca. 1408), Mujāni (Mojahn, ca. 1473–1503), and Nabe (Nabbe, before 1318)

With at least nine family members serving as bailiffs of Turaida and Koknese, the von Rosen family was the most prominent and influential among the vassals in the Livonian district of the Archbishopric of Riga. The Rosen family's origins can be traced back to Theoderich (Theodericus), a brother of Bishop Albert of Riga (Albert von Buxhoeveden) (ca. 1165–1229), according to the chronicle of Henry of Livonia, Theoderich married the daughter of Prince Vladimir of Pskow (Woldemarus, rex de Plicekowe), further solidifying the family's connection to the region. In 1213 Vladimir became the Bailiff of Ydumea instead of his son-in-law Theoderich.

== See also ==
- Krimulda Castle
- Sigulda Castle
- Sigulda Medieval Castle
- Lielstraupe Castle
- Mazstraupes Castle
- Koknese Castle
