= Paryż, Krapkowice County =

Paryż
- Village
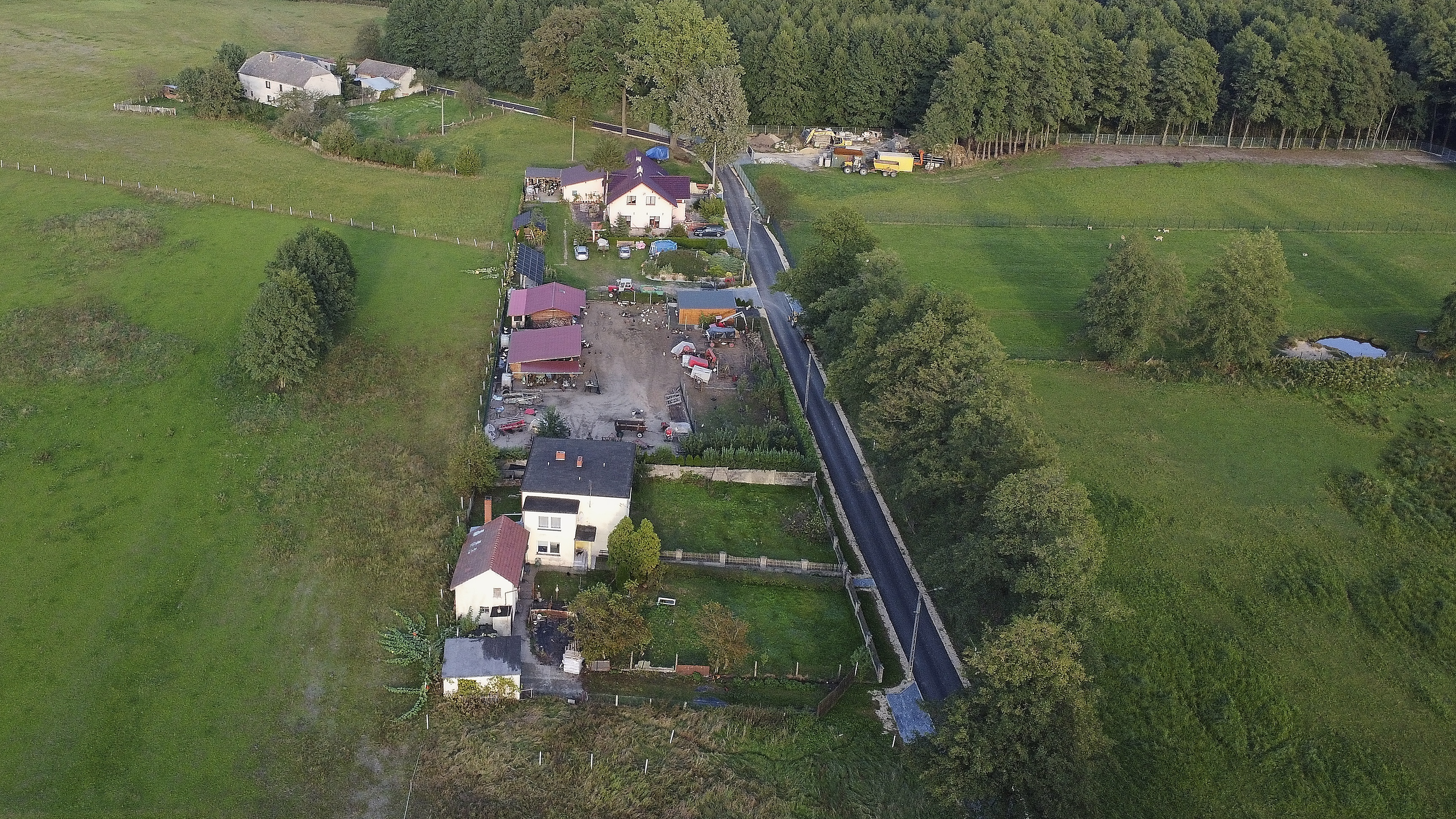

- Location within Poland
- Coordinates: 50°26′56″N 18°04′59″E
- Country: Poland
- Voivodeship: Opole
- County: Krapkowice
- Gmina: Zdzieszowice
- Time zone: UTC+1 (CET)
  - Summer (DST): UTC+2
- Postal code: 47-330
- Area code: +4877
- Vehicle registration: OKR

Paryż (German: Parys) is a village in the administrative district of Gmina Zdzieszowice, within Krapkowice County, Opole Voivodeship, south-western Poland.

== Etymology ==
The village was known as Parys in German. In 1936, Nazi administration of the German Reich changed the village's name to Teichäcker. Following the Second World War, the Polish name Paryż was introduced by the Commission for the Determination of Place Names.
