= Łęg, Opole Voivodeship =

Łęg
- Village
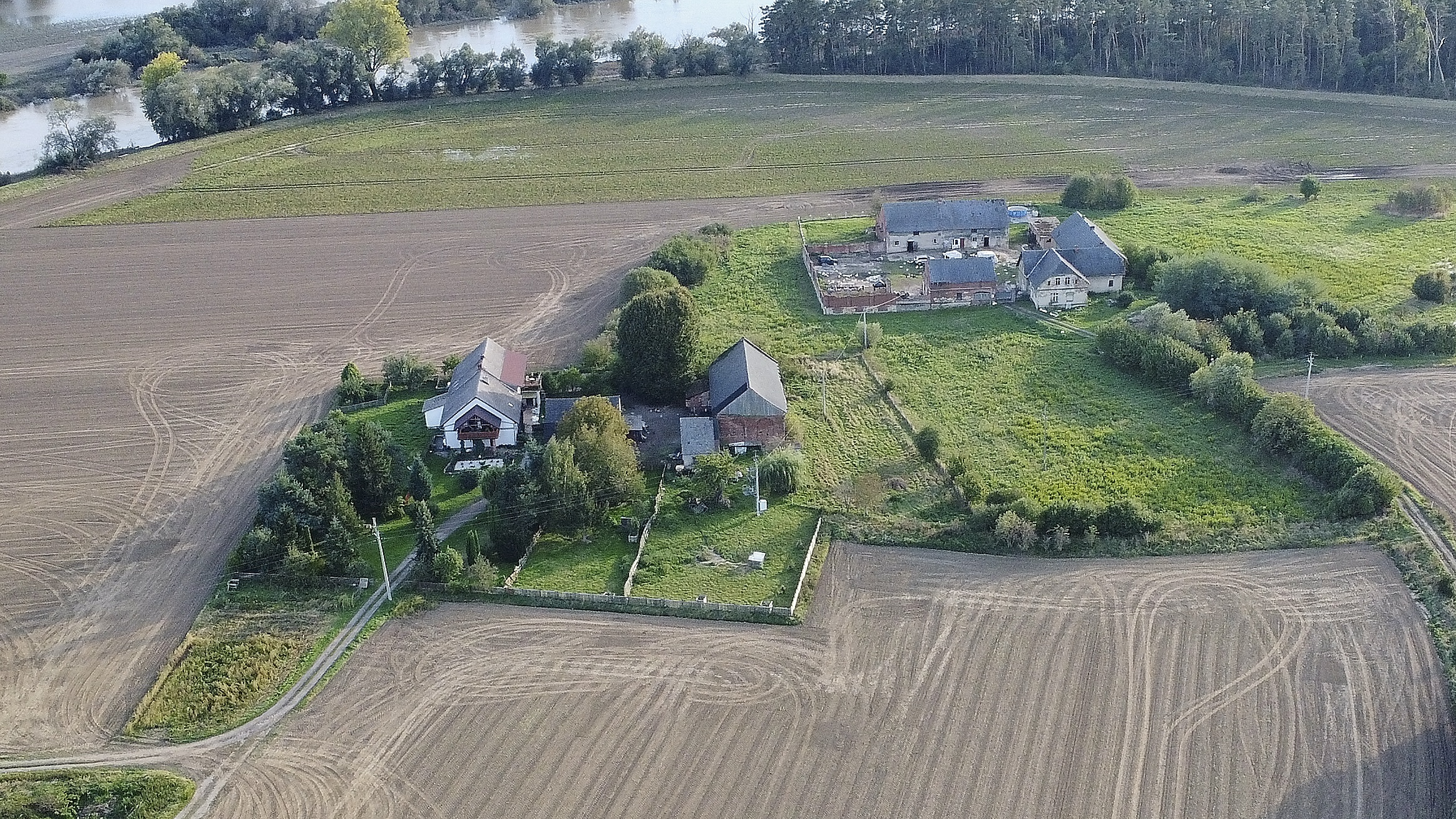

- Location within Poland
- Coordinates: 50°25′48″N 18°03′03″E
- Country: Poland
- Voivodeship: Opole
- County: Krapkowice
- Gmina: Zdzieszowice
- Time zone: UTC+1 (CET)
  - Summer (DST): UTC+2
- Postal code: 47-330
- Area code: +4877
- Vehicle registration: OKR

Łęg (German: Lang) is a village in the administrative district of Gmina Zdzieszowice, within Krapkowice County, Opole Voivodeship, south-western Poland.

== Etymology ==
The village was known as Lang in German. In 1936, Nazi administration of the German Reich changed the village's name to Oderhöfe. Following the Second World War, the Polish name Łęg was introduced by the Commission for the Determination of Place Names.
