= Kiełbice =

- Settlement
- Location within Poland
- Coordinates: 53°4′26″N 14°31′41″E
- Country: Poland
- Voivodeship: West Pomeranian
- County: Gryfino
- Gmina: Widuchowa

Kiełbice [kʲɛu̯ˈbit͡sɛ] (German: Kolbitz) is a settlement in the administrative district of Gmina Widuchowa, within Gryfino County, West Pomeranian Voivodeship, in north-western Poland, close to the German border. It lies approximately 12 km (7 mi) south-east of Widuchowa, 20 km (12 mi) south of Gryfino, and 39 km (24 mi) south of the regional capital Szczecin.

For the history of the region, see History of Pomerania.
