= Order of Polonia Restituta =

Polish state order for extraordinary and distinguished service

Order of Polonia Restituta Polish: Order Odrodzenia Polski
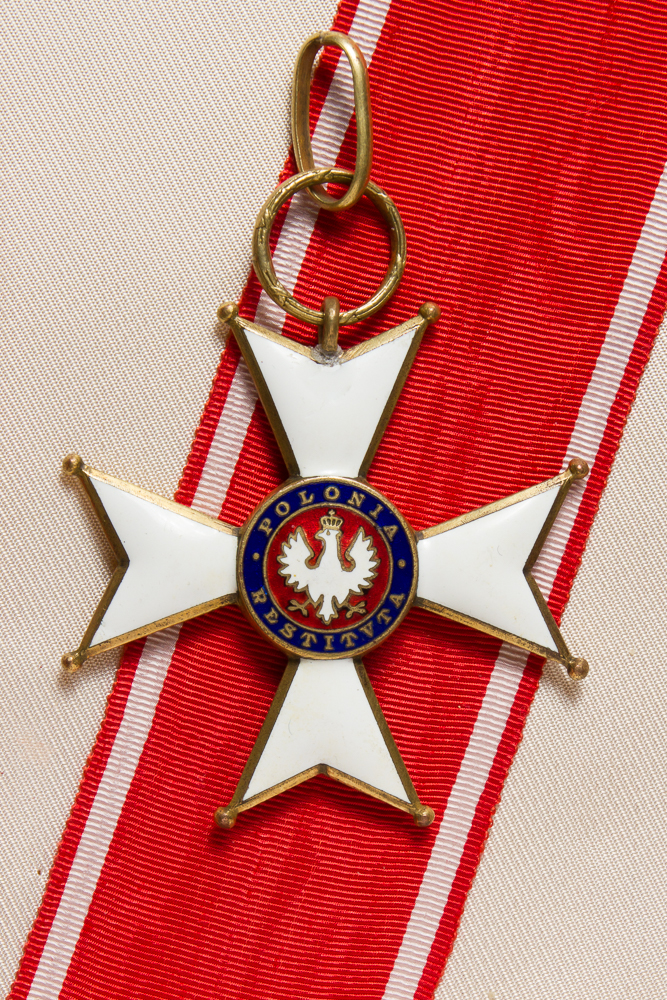
- Commander's Cross of Polonia Restituta
- Type: Five classes
- Awarded for: Extraordinary and distinguished service
- Country: Poland
- Presented by: the President of Poland
- Eligibility: All
- Status: Currently awarded
- Established: 4 February 1921
- Ribbon bar of the Grand Cross

Precedence
- Next (higher): Virtuti Militari
- Next (lower): Order of the Military Cross

The Order of Polonia Restituta (Note: Polish: Order Odrodzenia Polski) (English: Order of Restoration of Poland) is a Polish state order established 4 February 1921. It is conferred on both military and civilians as well as on foreigners for outstanding achievements in the fields of education, science, sport, culture, art, economics, national defense, social work, civil service, or for furthering good relations between countries. It is Poland's second-highest civilian state award in the order of precedence, behind the Order of the White Eagle.

The Order of Polonia Restituta is sometimes regarded as Poland's successor to the Order of the Knights of Saint Stanislaus, Bishop and Martyr, known as the Order of Saint Stanislaus, established in 1765 by Stanisław August Poniatowski, the last King of the Polish–Lithuanian Commonwealth, to honor supporters of the Polish crown.

== History ==
When Poland regained its independence from the German Empire, Austro-Hungarian Empire, and Russian Empire in 1918, the new Polish government abolished the activities of the Order of Saint Stanislaus (Imperial House of Romanov) in the country, due to the claimed abuses of its initial rules by the Russians, who often awarded their version to those who – according to the dominant view in newly independent Poland – had been responsible for the destruction of Poland and Polish culture.

Instead, the Order of Polonia Restituta was established on 4 February 1921 with Marshal Józef Piłsudski as first Grand Master, with the proclaimed aim of once again rewarding the noble values that it originally stood for. The Marshal awarded the first recipients on 13 July 1921. The order became Poland's main honour bestowed on foreigners, awarded by the Polish Ministry of Foreign Affairs.

After World War II both the Polish government-in-exile and the Communist People's Republic of Poland, aligned with the Warsaw Pact, awarded the order, though the versions differed slightly. Despite communist control, the order's prestige remained safe and it was even given to many people who were hardly model communists. The order was saved from abuse as it was simply passed over in favor of more traditional communist awards. During this time, the Order of Merit of Poland became the favored award for foreigners.

On 22 December 1990 the Polish government-in-exile returned the rights to its version of the order to the new Polish state. Invalid awards have been revoked, and today the remaining communist versions of the order hold the same status as any other issues.

=== Succession debate ===
Founded by the Polish Republic on 4 February 1921 as a secondary award to the Order of the White Eagle, the Order of Polonia Restituta, or the Order of the Restored Poland, has been alleged as an intended Polish successor to the Polish Order of Saint Stanislaus. The new Polonia Restituta order use the same ribbon as the old Saint Stanislaus order and their decorations are very similar. The goal was to preserve the tradition of the Order of Saint Stanislaus and its association with Polish history while changing the name which had become associated with Poland's oppression under the Russian Emperors.

== Organisation ==
Among Polish civilian awards, the Order is second only to the rarely awarded Order of the White Eagle. Historically, the order entitled its recipient to a state pension. As such, nominees for the award are evaluated by a special committee responsible for upholding the honour of the order.

The Chapter (Polish: Kapituła) of Polonia Restituta is composed of a Grand Master and eight members appointed by the Grand Master, who serve five-year terms. Upon becoming elected the President of Poland, the office-holder is automatically awarded the order and becomes the Grand Master of the Order Chapter. The names of new recipients are published in the Monitor Polski, a publication required to provide announcements of legal decisions to the public.

The Order of Polonia Restituta (Polska Odrodzona) has five classes, categorized according to the Constitution of Poland, Article 138, as follows:

=== Grand Cross ===
Order of Polonia Restituta First Class, Krzyż Wielki, the Grand Cross, referred to as the Grand Cordon.

=== Commander's Cross with Star ===
Order of Polonia Restituta Second Class, Krzyż Komandorski z Gwiazdą, the Commander's Cross with Star.

=== Commander's Cross ===
Order of Polonia Restituta Third Class, Krzyż Komandorski, the Commander's Cross.

=== Officer's Cross ===
Order of Polonia Restituta Fourth Class, Krzyż Oficerski, the Officer's Cross.

=== Knight's Cross ===
Order of Polonia Restituta Fifth Class, Krzyż Kawalerski, the Knight's Cross.

== Insignia ==
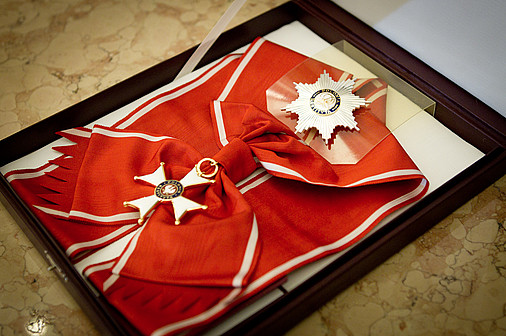
Grand Cross.

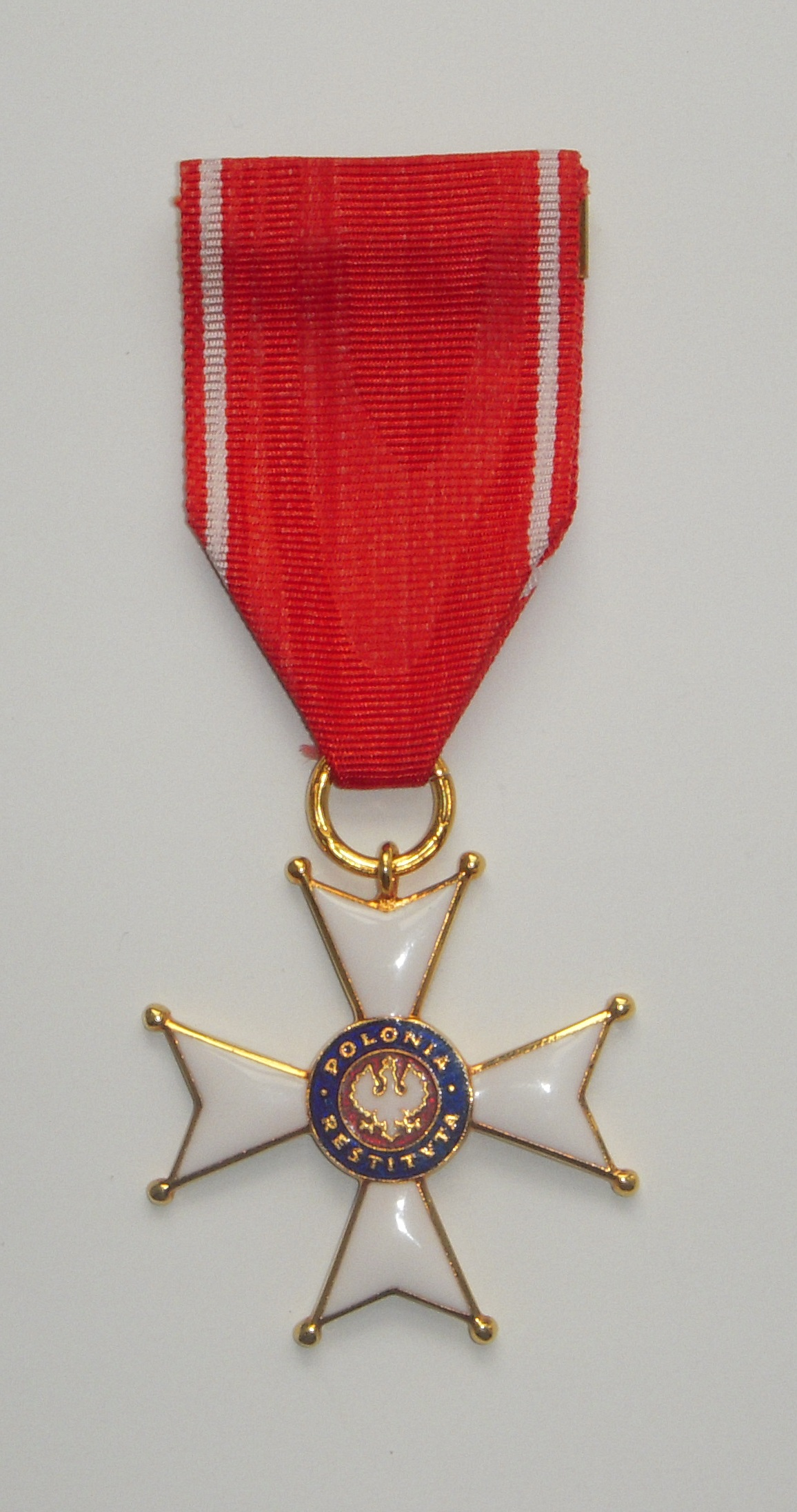
Knight's Cross.

The badge of the order is a gold Maltese cross enamelled in white. The obverse central disc bears a white eagle on red background, the Coat of Arms of Poland, surrounded by a blue ring bearing the words "Polonia Restituta". The reverse central disc bears the year 1918 (for the People's Republic of Poland version: 1944). It is worn on a ribbon, red with a white stripe near the edges, as a sash on the right shoulder for Grand Cross, around the neck for Commander with Star and Commander, on the left chest with rosette for Officer, and on the left chest without rosette for Knight.

The star of the order is an eight-pointed silver star with straight rays. The central disc is in white enamel, bearing the monogram "RP" (Republic of Poland) (for the People's Republic of Poland, "PRL") and surrounded by a blue ring bearing the Latin words "Polonia Restituta".

Class	Grand Cross (Polish: Krzyż Wielki)	Commander's Cross with Star (Polish: Krzyż Komandorski z Gwiazdą)	Commander's Cross (Polish: Krzyż Komandorski)	Officer's Cross (Polish: Krzyż Oficerski)	Knight's Cross (Polish: Krzyż Kawalerski)
Ribbon					
Insignia					

The five classes wearing their respective insignia (gentlemen): 1: Krzyż Kawalerski; 2: Krzyż Oficerski; 3: Krzyż Komandorski; 4: Krzyż Komandorski z Gwiazdą; 5: Krzyż Wielki

== See also ==
- Order of Saint Stanislaus
