= Polesiny =

- Village
- Location within Poland
- Coordinates: 53°3′N 14°29′E
- Country: Poland
- Voivodeship: West Pomeranian
- County: Gryfino
- Gmina: Widuchowa

Polesiny [pɔlɛˈɕinɨ] (German: Jägersfelde) is a village in the administrative district of Gmina Widuchowa, within Gryfino County, West Pomeranian Voivodeship, in north-western Poland, close to the German border. It lies approximately 11 km (7 mi) south-east of Widuchowa, 23 km (14 mi) south of Gryfino, and 42 km (26 mi) south of the regional capital Szczecin.

For the history of the region, see History of Pomerania.
