= Marwice, West Pomeranian Voivodeship =

Marwice
- Village
- Location within Poland
- Coordinates: 53°10′N 14°25′E
- Country: Poland
- Voivodeship: West Pomeranian
- County: Gryfino
- Gmina: Widuchowa

Marwice [marˈvit͡sɛ] (German: Marwitz) is a village in the administrative district of Gmina Widuchowa, within Gryfino County, West Pomeranian Voivodeship, in north-western Poland, close to the German border. It lies approximately 5 km (3 mi) north-east of Widuchowa, 11 km (7 mi) south-west of Gryfino, and 30 km (19 mi) south of the regional capital Szczecin.

For the history of the region, see History of Pomerania.
