= Lesiana =

- Village
- Location within Poland
- Coordinates: 50°22′55″N 18°06′53″E
- Country: Poland
- Voivodeship: Opole
- County: Krapkowice
- Gmina: Zdzieszowice
- Time zone: UTC+1 (CET)
  - Summer (DST): UTC+2
- Postal code: 47-330
- Area code: +4877
- Vehicle registration: OKR

Lesiana (German: Leschane) is a village in the administrative district of Gmina Zdzieszowice, within Krapkowice County, Opole Voivodeship, south-western Poland.

== Etymology ==
The village was known as Leschane in German. In 1936, Nazi administration of the German Reich changed the village's name to Waldig. Following the Second World War, the Polish name Lesiana was introduced by the Commission for the Determination of Place Names.
