= Skały, Opole Voivodeship =

Skały
- Village
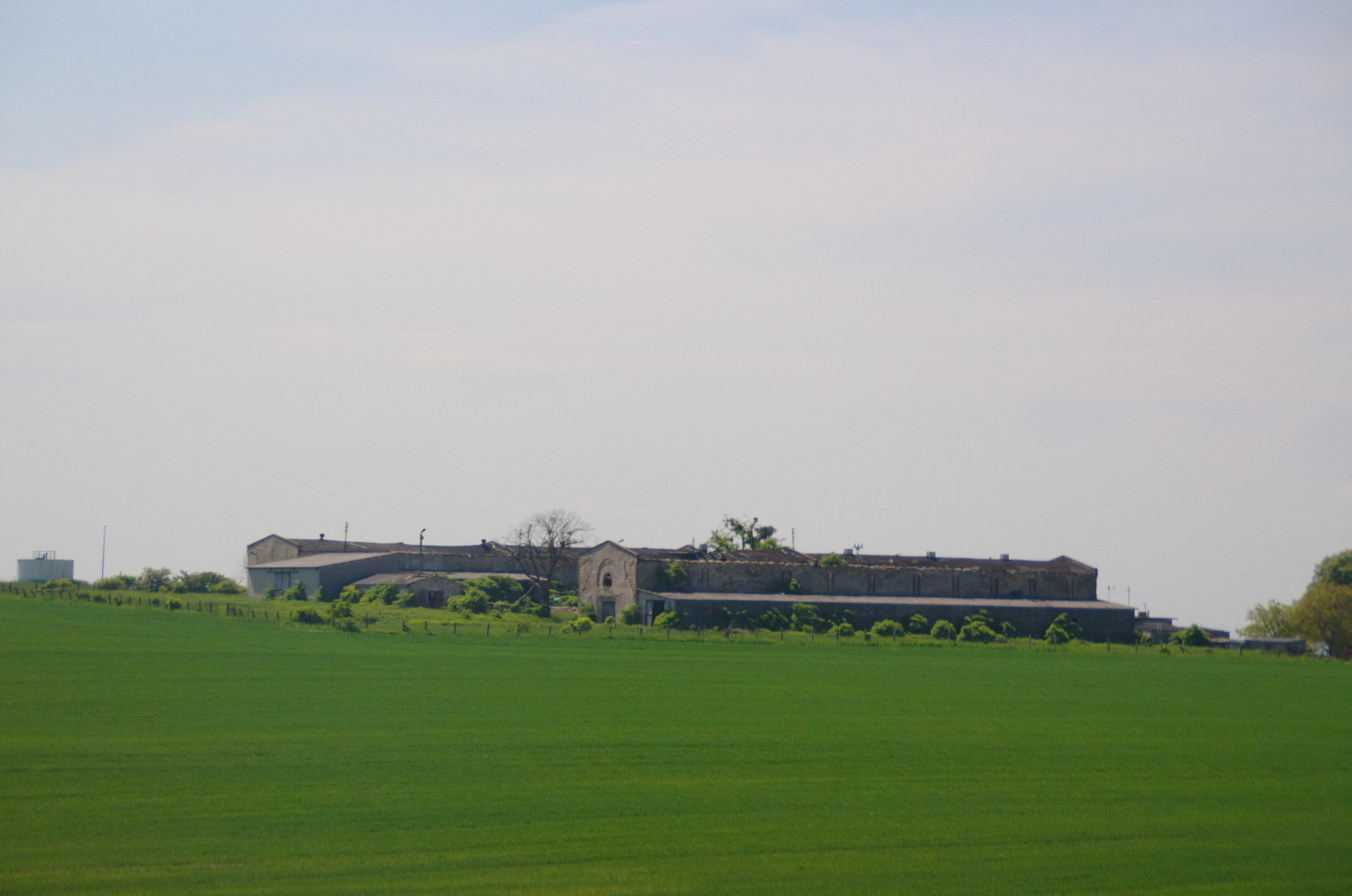

- Location within Poland
- Coordinates: 50°28′33″N 18°07′14″E
- Country: Poland
- Voivodeship: Opole
- County: Krapkowice
- Gmina: Zdzieszowice
- Time zone: UTC+1 (CET)
  - Summer (DST): UTC+2
- Postal code: 47-330
- Area code: +4877
- Vehicle registration: OKR

Skały (German: Ober Oleschka) is a village in the administrative district of Gmina Zdzieszowice, within Krapkowice County, Opole Voivodeship, south-western Poland.

== Etymology ==
The village was known as Ober Oleschka in German. In 1936, Nazi administration of the German Reich changed the village's name to Hubertushöh. Following the Second World War, the Polish name Skały was introduced by the Commission for the Determination of Place Names.
