= Krzywinek =

- Settlement
- Location within Poland
- Coordinates: 53°6′2″N 14°26′52″E
- Country: Poland
- Voivodeship: West Pomeranian
- County: Gryfino
- Gmina: Widuchowa

Krzywinek [kʂɨˈvinɛk] is a settlement in the administrative district of Gmina Widuchowa, within Gryfino County, West Pomeranian Voivodeship, in north-western Poland, close to the German border. It lies approximately 5 km (3 mi) south-east of Widuchowa, 17 km (11 mi) south of Gryfino, and 37 km (23 mi) south of the regional capital Szczecin.

For the history of the region, see History of Pomerania.
