= Bolkowice =

Bolkowice may refer to the following places in Poland:

- Bolkowice, Lower Silesian Voivodeship (south-west Poland)
- Bolkowice, West Pomeranian Voivodeship (north-west Poland)
