= Stanisław Srokowski =

Polish diplomat and geometer (1872–1950)

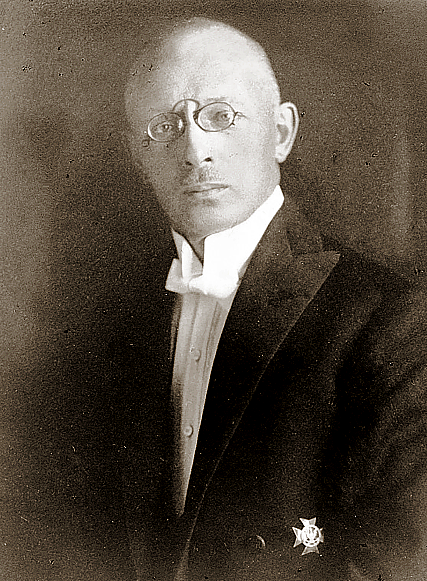
- Born: July 8, 1872; Węgrzce
- Died: August 20, 1950 (aged 78); Warsaw
- Resting place: Protestant Reformed Cemetery, Warsaw
- Title: Voivode of Wołyń
- Term: 1923–1924
- Predecessor: Mieczysław Mickiewicz
- Successor: Kajetan Olszewski

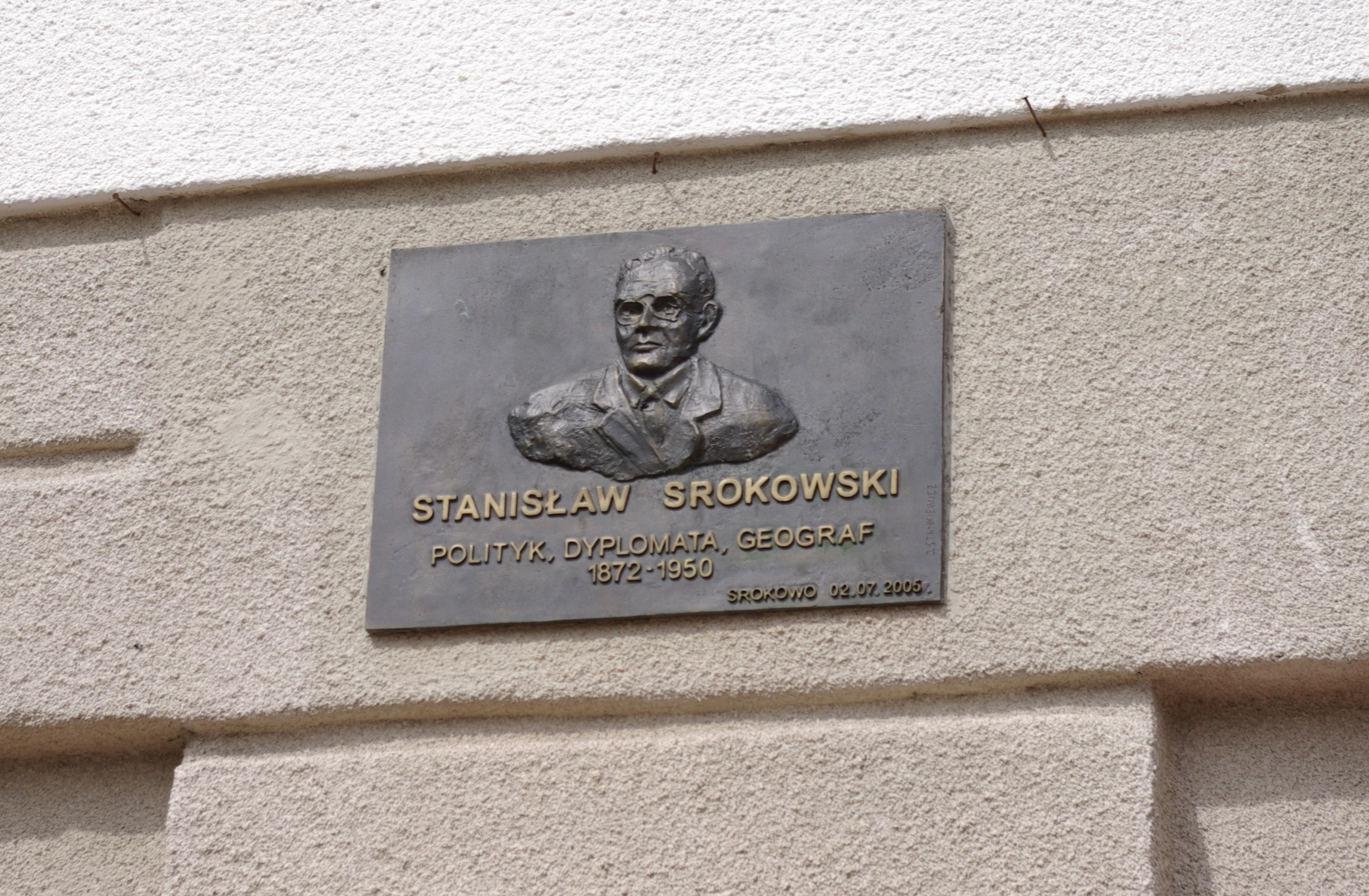
Commemorative plaque to Srokowski at the town hall of Srokowo, named after him in 1950

Stanisław Józef Srokowski (8 July 1872 in Węgrzce - 20 August 1950 in Warsaw) was a Polish geographer and diplomat.

Srokowski joined the Polish diplomatic service in 1920 and became the Polish Consul at Odesa and Königsberg. In 1923-1924 he was the Voivode of the Wołyń Voivodeship and became the Director of the Polish Baltic Institute at Toruń in 1926.

Srokowski was also a professor at the University of Warsaw prior to World War II and President of the Polish Geographical Society.

In 1946-1950 he was the head of the Polish Committee for Settling of Place Names (Komisja Ustalania Nazw Miejscowości), which determined the names of towns and villages in the territories that became again part of Poland after World War II.

Srokowski died in 1950, the village of Dryfort was renamed Srokowo in his memory.

== Publications ==
- Geografia gospodarcza Polski Warszawa 1939 Wyd. Instytut Społeczny
- Geografia gospodarcza ogólna Warszawa 1950 Wyd. Państwowe Zakłady Wydawnictw Szkolnych
- Z dni zawieruchy dziejowej: 1914-1918 Kraków 1932, Nakładem Księgarni Geograficznej "Orbis"
- Prusy Wschodnie. Studium Geograficzne, Gospodarcze i Społeczne Gdańsk - Bydgoszcz - Toruń 1945, Wyd. Biuro Ziem Zachodnich przy Ministerstwie Administracji Publicznej
- Prusy Wschodnie Warszawa 1947, Wyd. Państwowe Zakłady Wydawnictw Szkolnych
- Z krainy Czarnego Krzyża, Olsztyn 1980 Wyd. Pojezierze ISBN 83-7002-046-1
- Czesi: szkic kulturalno-obyczajowy Kraków 1898 Wyd. Hoesicka
- Wspomnienia z trzeciego powstania górnośląskiego 1921 r. Poznań 1926 Wyd. Związek Obrony Kresów Zachodnich,
- Zarys geografii fizycznej ziem polsko-litewsko-ruskich Kijów 1918, Wyd. Rady Okręgowej
- Uwagi o kresach wschodnich Kraków 1925
- Pomorze Zachodnie Gdańsk 1947 Wyd. Instytut Bałtycki
