= Żelechowo =

- Village
- Location within Poland
- Coordinates: 53°3′N 14°32′E
- Country: Poland
- Voivodeship: West Pomeranian
- County: Gryfino
- Gmina: Widuchowa
- Elevation: 58 m (190 ft)
- Population: 446
- Time zone: UTC+1 (Central European Time)
  - Summer (DST): UTC+2 (Central European Summer Time)
- Vehicle registration: ZGR

Żelechowo [ʐɛlɛˈxɔvɔ] is a village in the administrative district of Gmina Widuchowa, within Gryfino County, West Pomeranian Voivodeship, in north-western Poland, close to the German border. It lies approximately 13 km (8 mi) south-east of Widuchowa, 23 km (14 mi) south of Gryfino, and 41 km (25 mi) south of the regional capital Szczecin.

On 31 December 2008, the village had 446 inhabitants.

Between 1975 and 1998 the village administratively belonged to the Szczecin Voivodeship.

For the history of the region, see History of Pomerania.
