= Rynica =

- Village
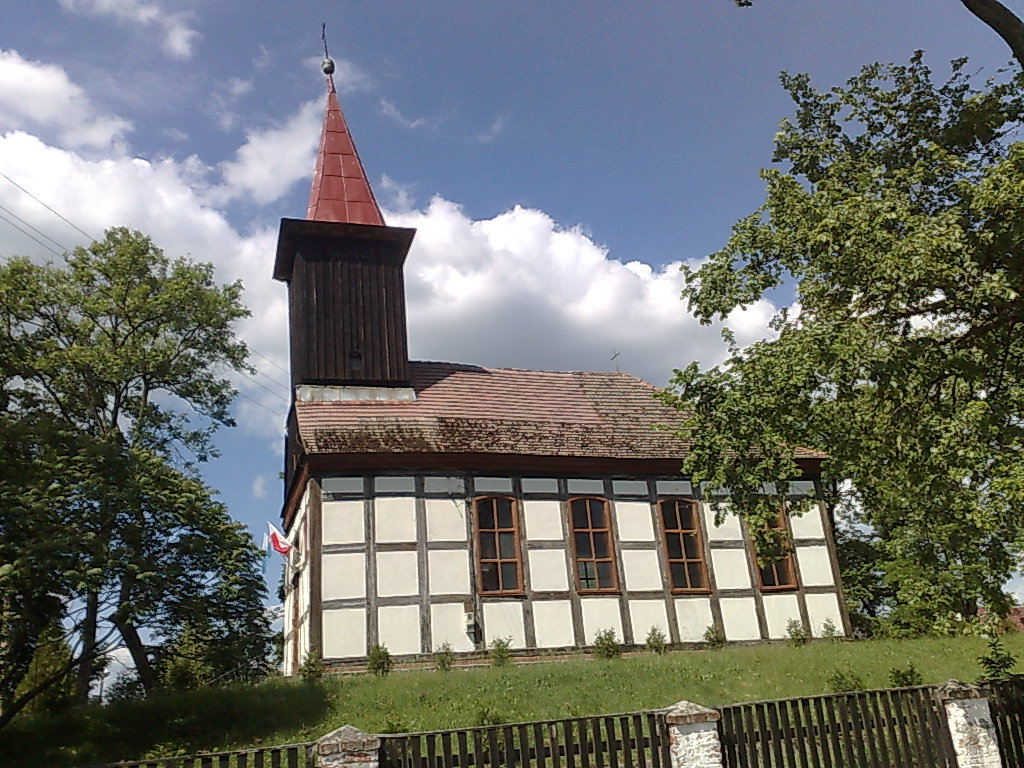
- Former Protestant, currently Catholic church

- Location within Poland
- Coordinates: 53°3′N 14°25′E
- Country: Poland
- Voivodeship: West Pomeranian
- County: Gryfino
- Gmina: Widuchowa

Rynica [rɨˈnit͡sa] (German: Roderbeck) is a village in the administrative district of Gmina Widuchowa, within Gryfino County, West Pomeranian Voivodeship, in north-western Poland, close to the German border. It lies approximately 9 km (6 mi) south of Widuchowa, 23 km (14 mi) south of Gryfino, and 43 km (27 mi) south of the regional capital Szczecin.

For the history of the region, see History of Pomerania.
