= Czarnówko, West Pomeranian Voivodeship =

Czarnówko
- Village
- Location within Poland
- Coordinates: 53°8′54″N 14°30′38″E
- Country: Poland
- Voivodeship: West Pomeranian
- County: Gryfino
- Gmina: Widuchowa
- Population: 110

Czarnówko [t͡ʂarˈnufkɔ] (German: Klein Zarnow) is a village in the administrative district of Gmina Widuchowa, within Gryfino County, West Pomeranian Voivodeship, in north-western Poland, close to the German border. It lies approximately 9 km (6 mi) east of Widuchowa, 12 km (7 mi) south of Gryfino, and 31 km (19 mi) south of the regional capital Szczecin.

For the history of the region, see the History of Pomerania.

The village has a population of 110.
