= Oleszka =

- Village
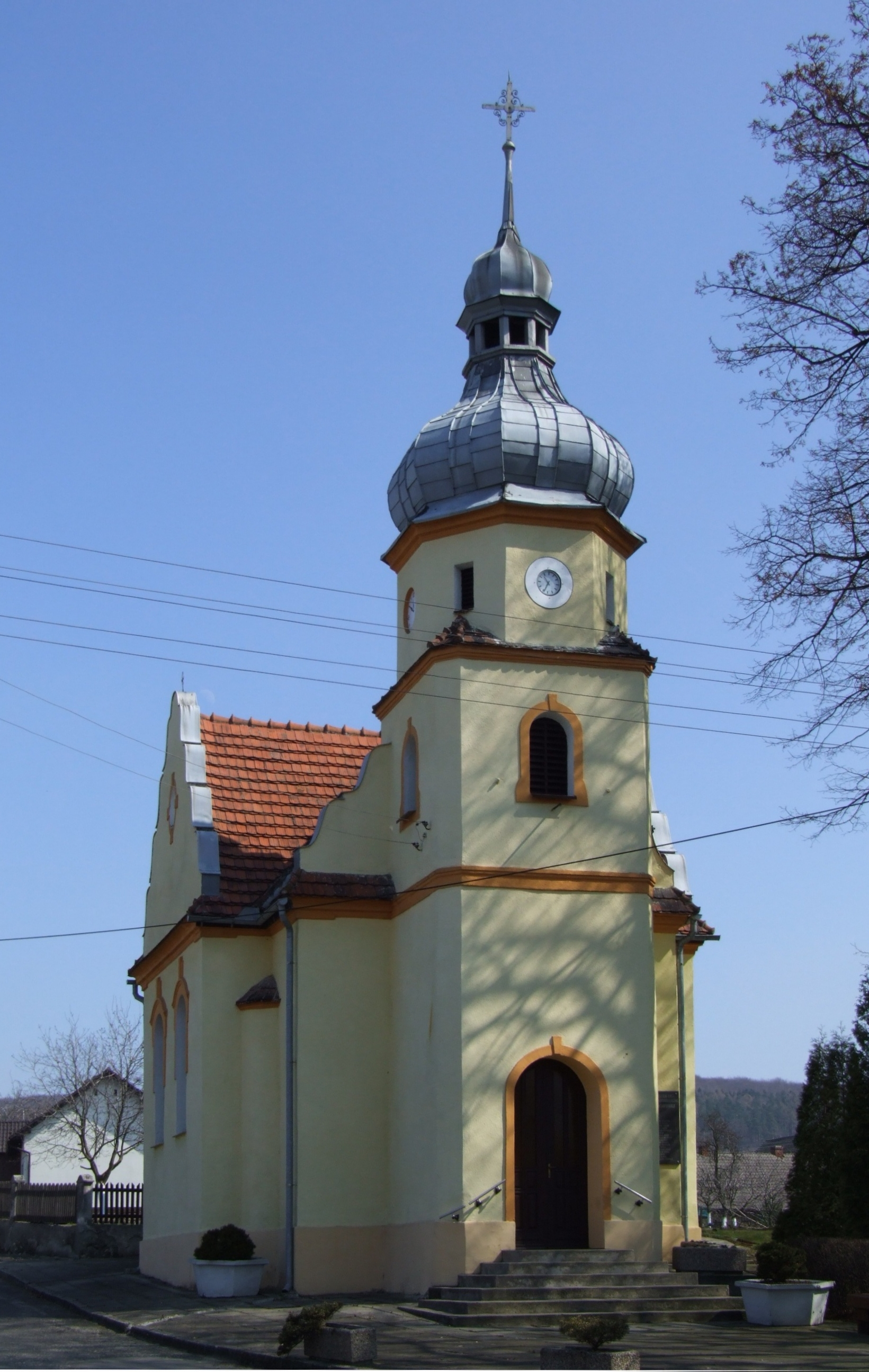
- Chapel in Oleszka

- Location within Poland
- Coordinates: 50°28′1″N 18°7′24″E
- Country: Poland
- Voivodeship: Opole
- County: Krapkowice
- Gmina: Zdzieszowice

Oleszka [ɔˈlɛʂka] (German: Oleschka) is a village in the administrative district of Gmina Zdzieszowice, within Krapkowice County, Opole Voivodeship, in south-western Poland.
