= Wilcze, Gmina Widuchowa =

Wilcze
- Village
- Location within Poland
- Coordinates: 53°05′18″N 14°31′10″E
- Country: Poland
- Voivodeship: West Pomeranian
- County: Gryfino
- Gmina: Widuchowa

Wilcze [ˈvilt͡ʂɛ] is a village in the administrative district of Gmina Widuchowa, within Gryfino County, West Pomeranian Voivodeship, in north-western Poland, close to the German border.

For the history of the region, see History of Pomerania.
