= Borek, Gmina Zdzieszowice =

Village in Poland

Borek
- Village
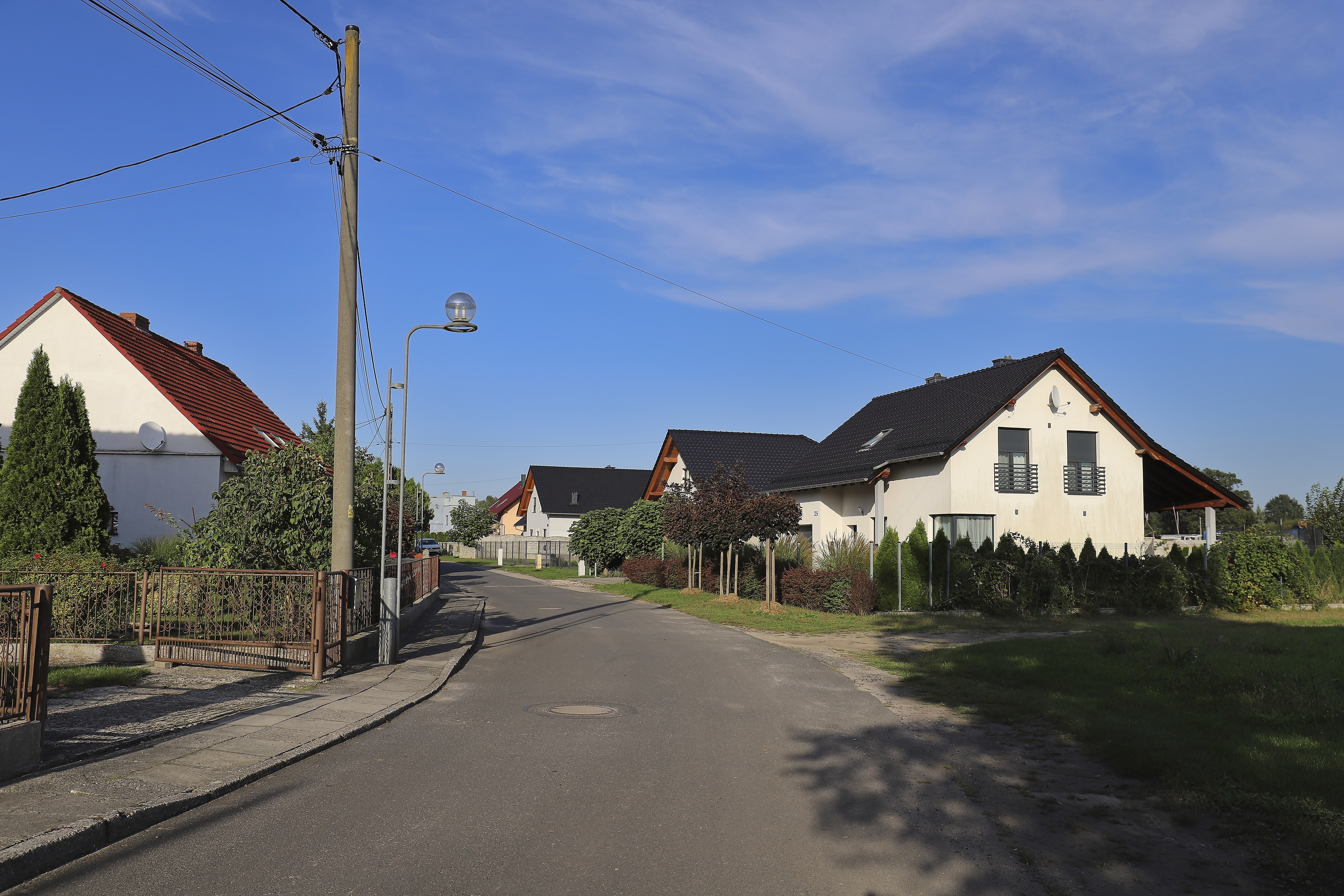

- Location within Poland
- Coordinates: 50°26′34″N 18°04′04″E
- Country: Poland
- Voivodeship: Opole
- County: Krapkowice
- Gmina: Zdzieszowice
- Time zone: UTC+1 (CET)
  - Summer (DST): UTC+2
- Postal code: 47-330
- Area code: +4877
- Vehicle registration: OKR
- SIMC: 0505540

Borek is a village in the administrative district of Gmina Zdzieszowice, within Krapkowice County, Opole Voivodeship, south-western Poland.
