= Węgrzce, Lesser Poland Voivodeship =

Węgrzce
- Village
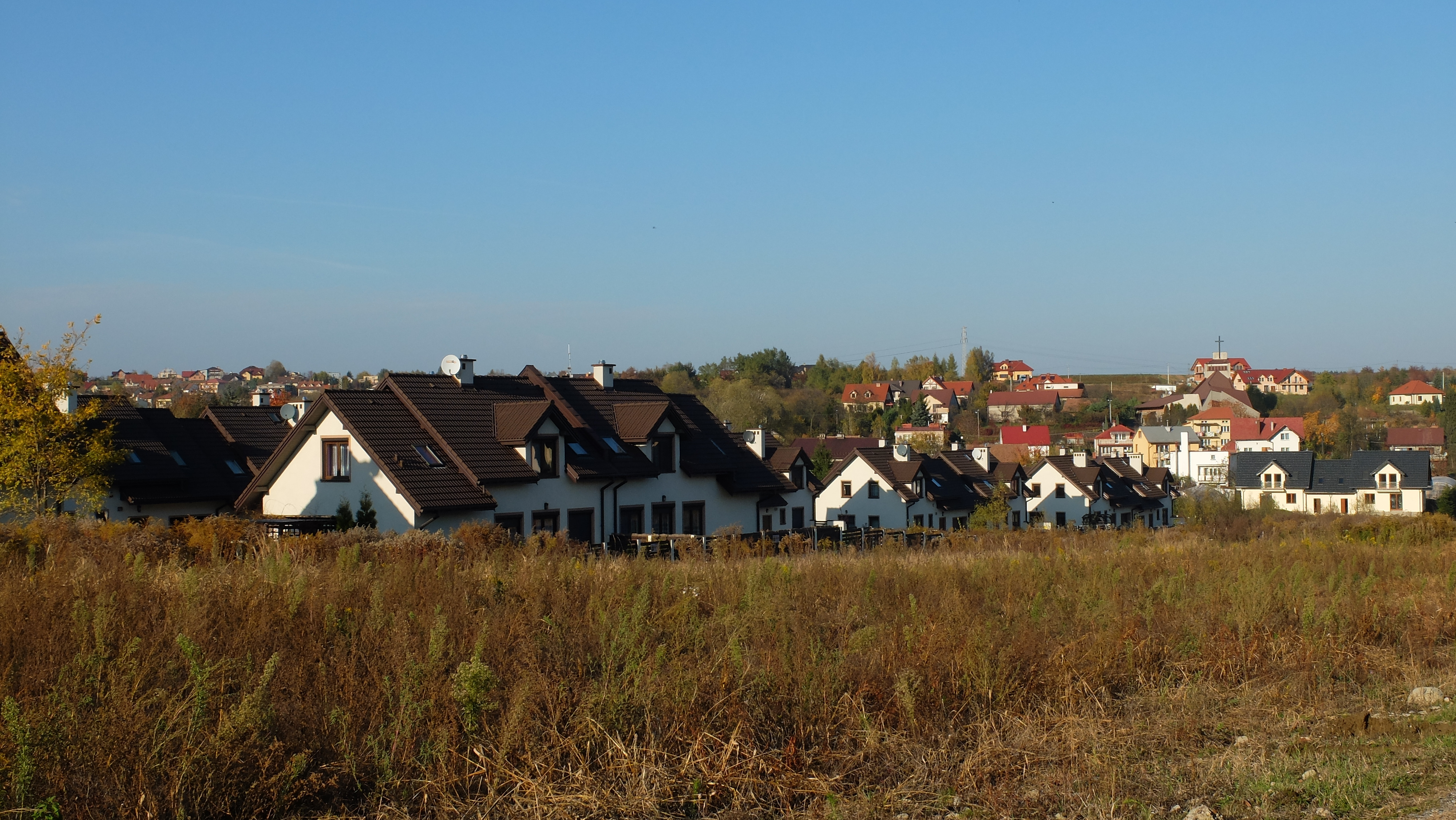
- View towards Węgrzce

- Location within Poland
- Coordinates: 50°7′12″N 19°58′10″E
- Country: Poland
- Voivodeship: Lesser Poland
- County: Kraków
- Gmina: Zielonki

Population
  - Total: 1,400
- Website: http://wegrzce.sgv.pl

Węgrzce [ˈvɛŋkʂt͡sɛ] is a village in the administrative district of Gmina Zielonki, within Kraków County, Lesser Poland Voivodeship, in southern Poland.

== Notable people ==
- Stanisław Srokowski, geographer and politician
