= Gmina Zdzieszowice =

Gmina Zdzieszowice Zdzieszowice Commune
- Gmina
- Flag Coat of arms
- Interactive map of Gmina Zdzieszowice
- Coordinates (Zdzieszowice): 50°25′9″N 18°7′25″E
- Country: Poland
- Voivodeship: Opole
- County: Krapkowice
- Seat: Zdzieszowice

Area
  - Total: 57.85 km^{2} (22.34 sq mi)

Population (2019-06-30)
  - Total: 15,740
  - Density: 272.1/km^{2} (704.7/sq mi)
  - Urban: 11,445
  - Rural: 4,295
- Website: https://zdzieszowice.pl

Gmina Zdzieszowice is an urban-rural gmina (administrative district) in Krapkowice County, Opole Voivodeship, in south-western Poland. Its seat is the town of Zdzieszowice, which lies approximately 13 kilometres (8 mi) south-east of Krapkowice and 31 km (19 mi) south-east of the regional capital Opole.

The gmina covers an area of 57.85 square kilometres (22.3 sq mi). As of 2019, its total population was 15,740.

The gmina contains part of the protected area called Góra Świętej Anny Landscape Park.

== Villages ==
Apart from the town of Zdzieszowice, Gmina Zdzieszowice contains the villages and settlements of Dalnie, Bąków, Borek, Januszkowice, Jasiona, Krępna, Łęg, Lesiana, Oleszka, Paryż, Pietrowice, Rozwadza, Skały, Urzek, Wielmierzowice, Żyrowa.

== Neighbouring gminas ==
Gmina Zdzieszowice is bordered by the town of Kędzierzyn-Koźle and by the gminas of Gogolin, Krapkowice, Leśnica, Reńska Wieś, Strzelce Opolskie and Walce.

== Twin towns – sister cities ==
Gmina Zdzieszowice is twinned with:

- Lipník nad Bečvou, Czech Republic
