= Kłodowo =

- Village
- Location within Poland
- Coordinates: 53°05′30″N 14°29′51″E
- Country: Poland
- Voivodeship: West Pomeranian
- County: Gryfino
- Gmina: Widuchowa

Kłodowo [kwɔˈdɔvɔ] (German: Kladow) is a village in the administrative district of Gmina Widuchowa, within Gryfino County, West Pomeranian Voivodeship, in north-western Poland, close to the German border.

For the history of the region, see History of Pomerania.
