= Witold Taszycki =

Polish linguist (1898–1979)

Witold Taszycki (20 June 1898 – 9 August 1979) was a Polish linguist. He specialized in Polish onomastics and historical dialectology.

== Life and career ==
Taszycki was born on 20 June 1898 in Zagórzany, Austria-Hungary. Between 1917 and 1921, he was a student of Polish and Slavic philology at Jagiellonian University, where he started to work as an assistant after defending his doctorate in 1922. He received his postdoctoral degree in 1925. He was employed as a lecturer at Stefan Batory University of Wilno (now Vilnius, Lithuania) and awarded a professorship at Jan Kazimierz University of Lwów (now Lviv, Ukraine). He remained in Lwów after the outbreak of World War II and was involved in secret university teaching.

In the post-war period, he helped to organize Slavic and Polish studies at Nicolaus Copernicus University in Toruń and the University of Wrocław, and participated in works of the Commission for the Determination of Place Names. In 1946 he was awarded a professorship at Jagiellonian University, where he chaired the departments of Slavonic Onomastics, Old Polish Philology, and Polish Language. He was a member of the Polish Academy of Arts and Sciences and the Polish Academy of Sciences.

Taszycki is valued for his contributions to the development of onomastic research in Poland. He was an expert on Old Polish and had studied nearly all known manuscripts and publications written in that language.

Among his most notable works is "Dictionary of Old Polish Personal Names". It contains information on Polish nomenclature gathered from sources ranging from the oldest known records to the start of the 16h century. "An orthographic dictionary and the rules of Polish spelling", co-authored by Taszycki with Stanisław Jodłowski, was the most widely used Polish orthographic dictionary in the interwar period.

Taszycki died on 9 August 1979 in Kraków.

== Bibliography ==
- Encyclopedia of Ukraine. Paris — New York: Молоде Життя. 1954–1989.
