= Gmina Widuchowa =

Gmina Widuchowa Widuchowa Commune
- Gmina
- Flag Coat of arms

- Location within Poland
- Coordinates (Widuchowa): 53°7′40″N 14°23′20″E
- Country: Poland
- Voivodeship: West Pomeranian
- County: Gryfino
- Seat: Widuchowa

Area
  - Total: 209.63 km^{2} (80.94 sq mi)

Population (2006)
  - Total: 5,562
  - Density: 26.53/km^{2} (68.72/sq mi)
- Website: https://www.widuchowa.pl/

Gmina Widuchowa is a rural gmina (administrative district) in Gryfino County, West Pomeranian Voivodeship, in north-western Poland, on the German border. Its seat is the village of Widuchowa, which lies approximately 15 kilometres (9 mi) south-west of Gryfino and 35 km (22 mi) south of the regional capital Szczecin.

The gmina covers an area of 209.63 square kilometres (80.9 sq mi), and as of 2006 its total population is 5,562.

The gmina contains parts of the protected areas of Cedynia Landscape Park and Lower Odra Valley Landscape Park.

== Villages ==
Gmina Widuchowa contains the villages and settlements of Bolkowice, Czarnówko, Dębogóra, Kiełbice, Kłodowo, Krzywin, Krzywinek, Lubicz, Lubiczyn, Marwice, Ognica, Pacholęta, Pąkowo, Polesiny, Radoszki, Rynica, Tarnogórki, Widuchowa, Widuchówko, Wilcze, Żarczyn and Żelechowo.

== Neighbouring gminas ==
Gmina Widuchowa is bordered by the gminas of Banie, Chojna and Gryfino. It also borders Germany.
