= Wielmierzowice =

- Village
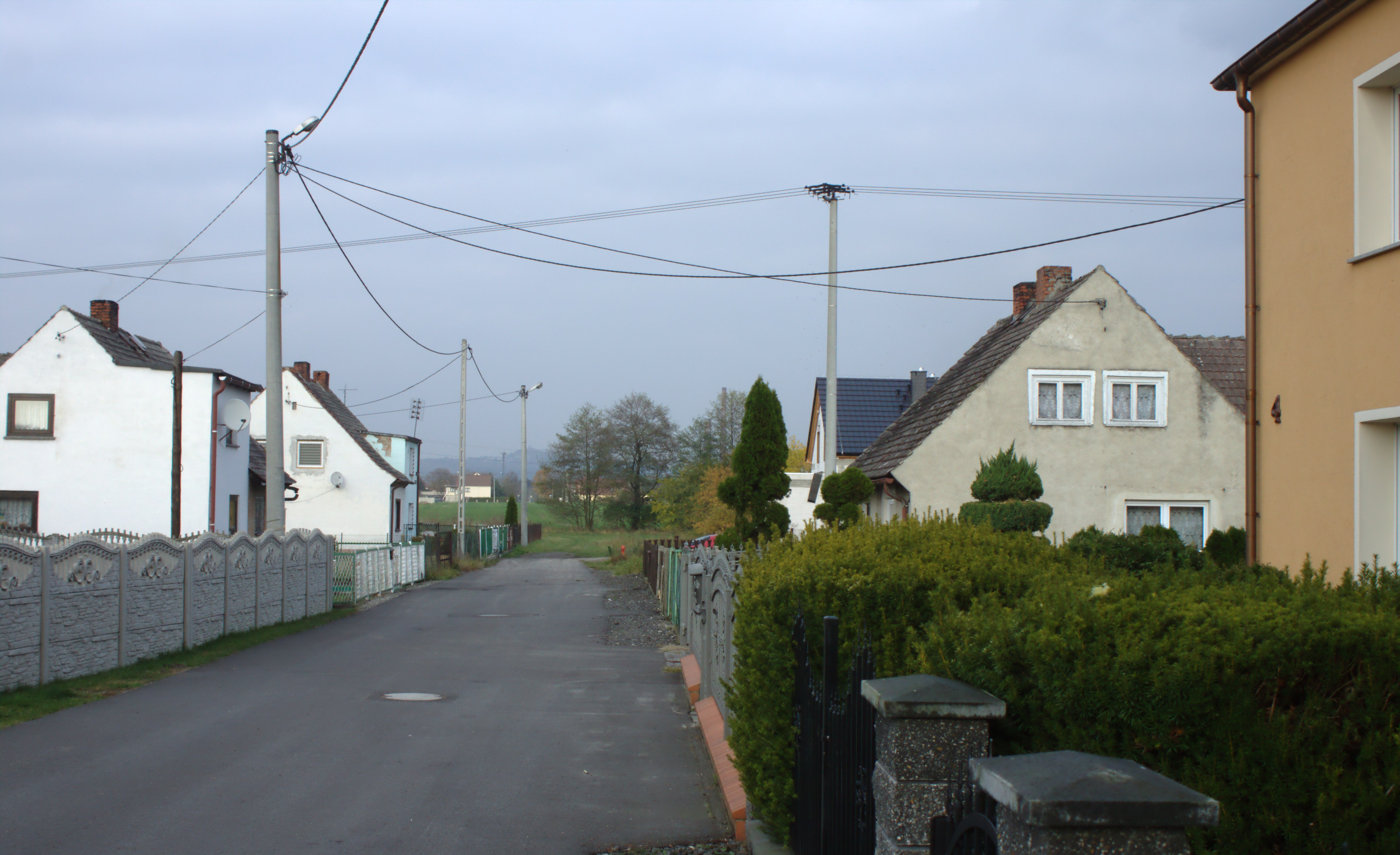
- Street

- Location within Poland
- Coordinates: 50°24′24″N 18°7′8″E
- Country: Poland
- Voivodeship: Opole
- County: Krapkowice
- Gmina: Zdzieszowice

Wielmierzowice [vjɛlmjɛʐɔˈvit͡sɛ] (German: Wielmirzowitz) is a village in the administrative district of Gmina Zdzieszowice, within Krapkowice County, Opole Voivodeship, in south-western Poland.

== Gallery ==
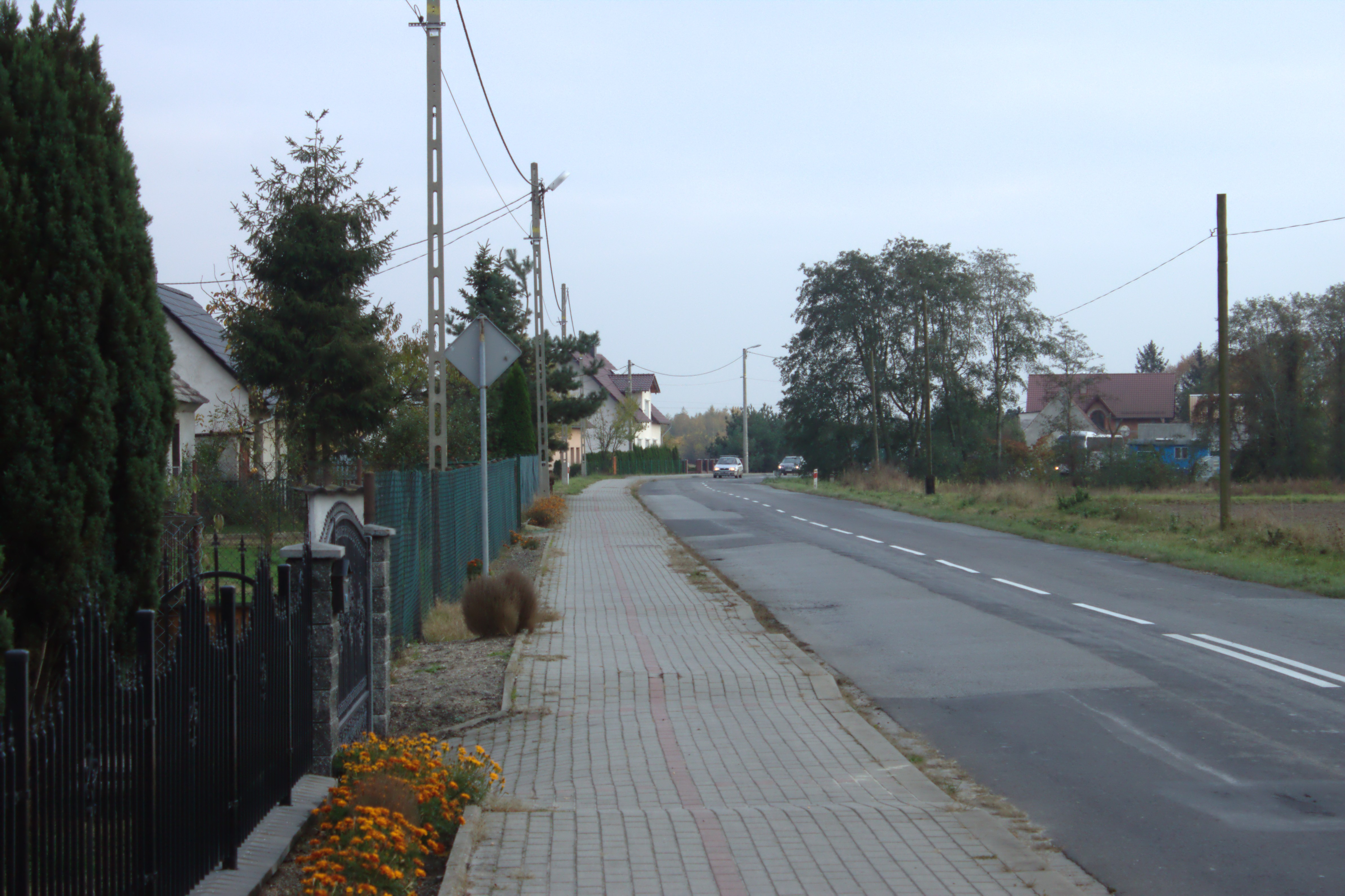
Road

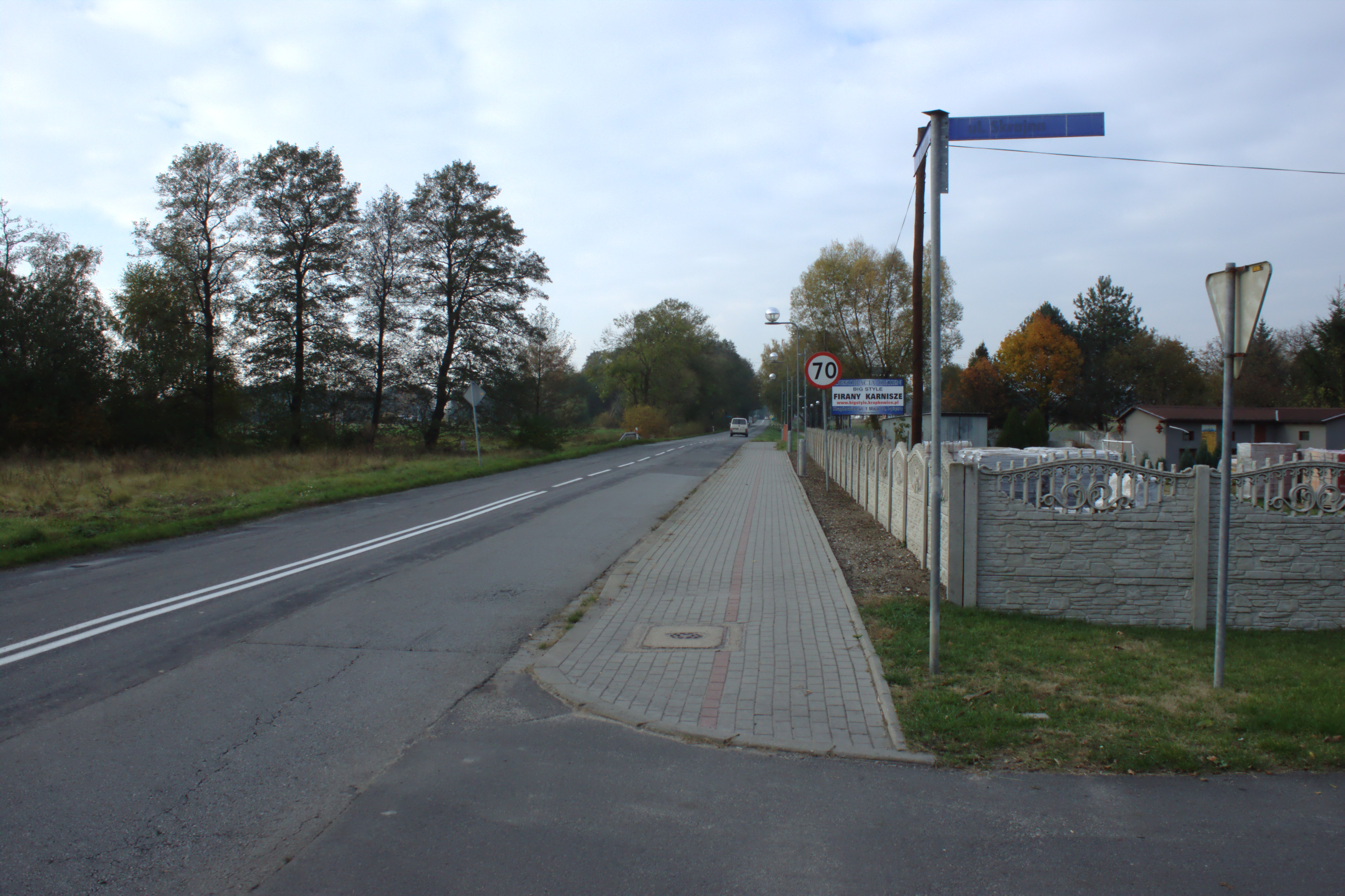
Other side of the same road
