= Krępna =

- Village
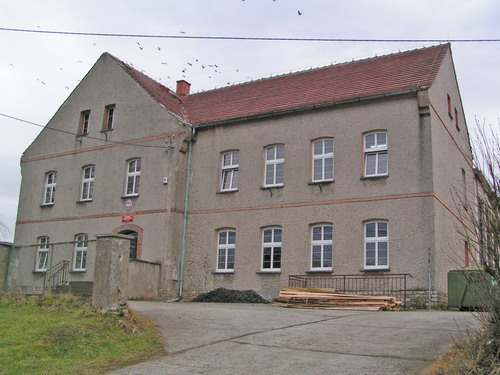
- School

- Location within Poland
- Coordinates: 50°26′47″N 18°4′23″E
- Country: Poland
- Voivodeship: Opole
- County: Krapkowice
- Gmina: Zdzieszowice
- Elevation: 180 m (590 ft)
- Population: 626
- Website: http://www.krepna.go.pl

Krępna [ˈkrɛmpna] (German: Krempa) is a village in the administrative district of Gmina Zdzieszowice, within Krapkowice County, Opole Voivodeship, in south-western Poland.
