= Widuchówko =

- Settlement
- Location within Poland
- Coordinates: 53°06′45″N 14°24′19″E
- Country: Poland
- Voivodeship: West Pomeranian
- County: Gryfino
- Gmina: Widuchowa

Widuchówko [viduˈxufkɔ] is a settlement in the administrative district of Gmina Widuchowa, within Gryfino County, West Pomeranian Voivodeship, in north-western Poland, close to the German border.

For the history of the region, see History of Pomerania.
