= Januszkowice, Opole Voivodeship =

Januszkowice
- Village
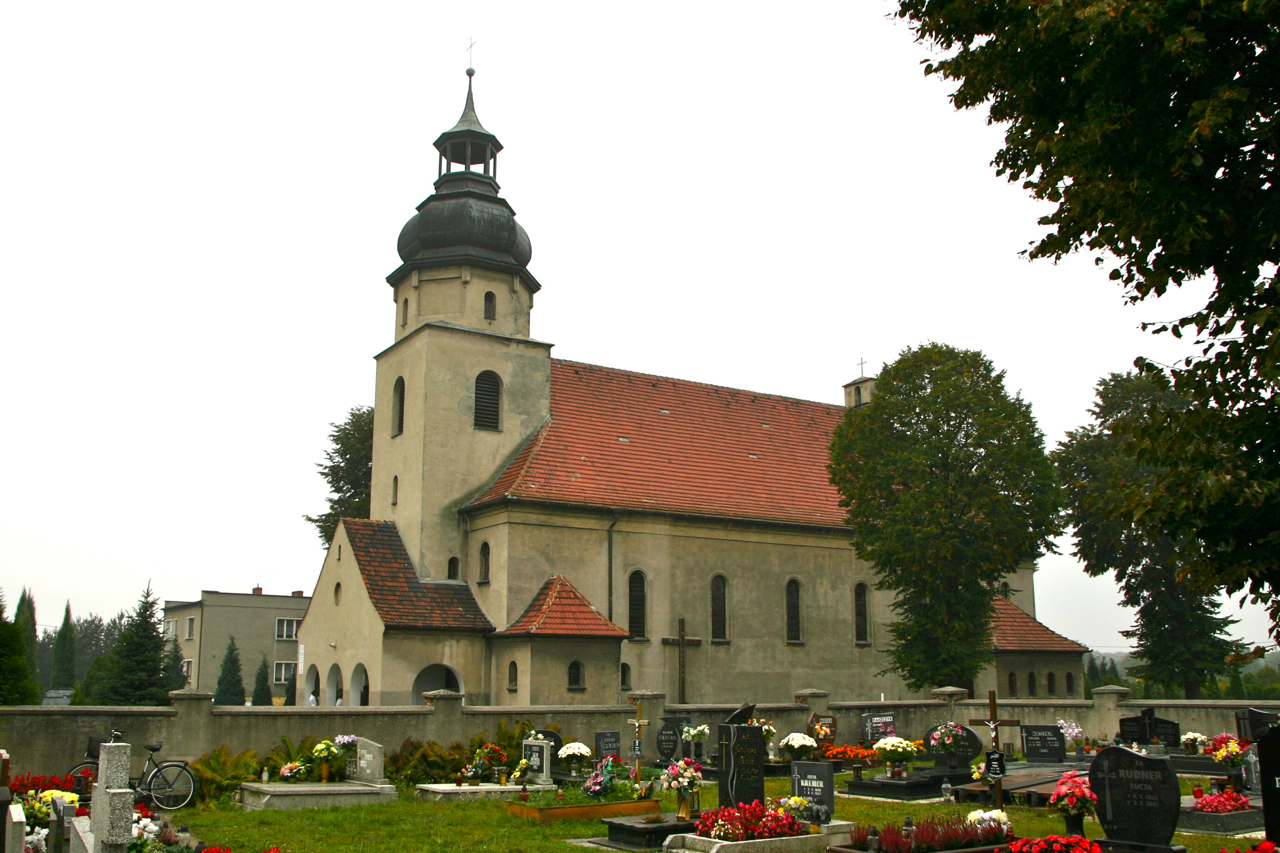
- Saint Blaise Church

- Location within Poland
- Coordinates: 50°26′47.80″N 18°06′27.30″E
- Country: Poland
- Voivodeship: Opole
- County: Krapkowice
- Gmina: Zdzieszowice

Januszkowice [januʂkɔˈvit͡sɛ] (German: Januschkowitz) is a village in the administrative district of Gmina Zdzieszowice, within Krapkowice County, Opole Voivodeship, in south-western Poland.
