= Zdzieszowice =

Zdzieszowice Źdźyszowicy
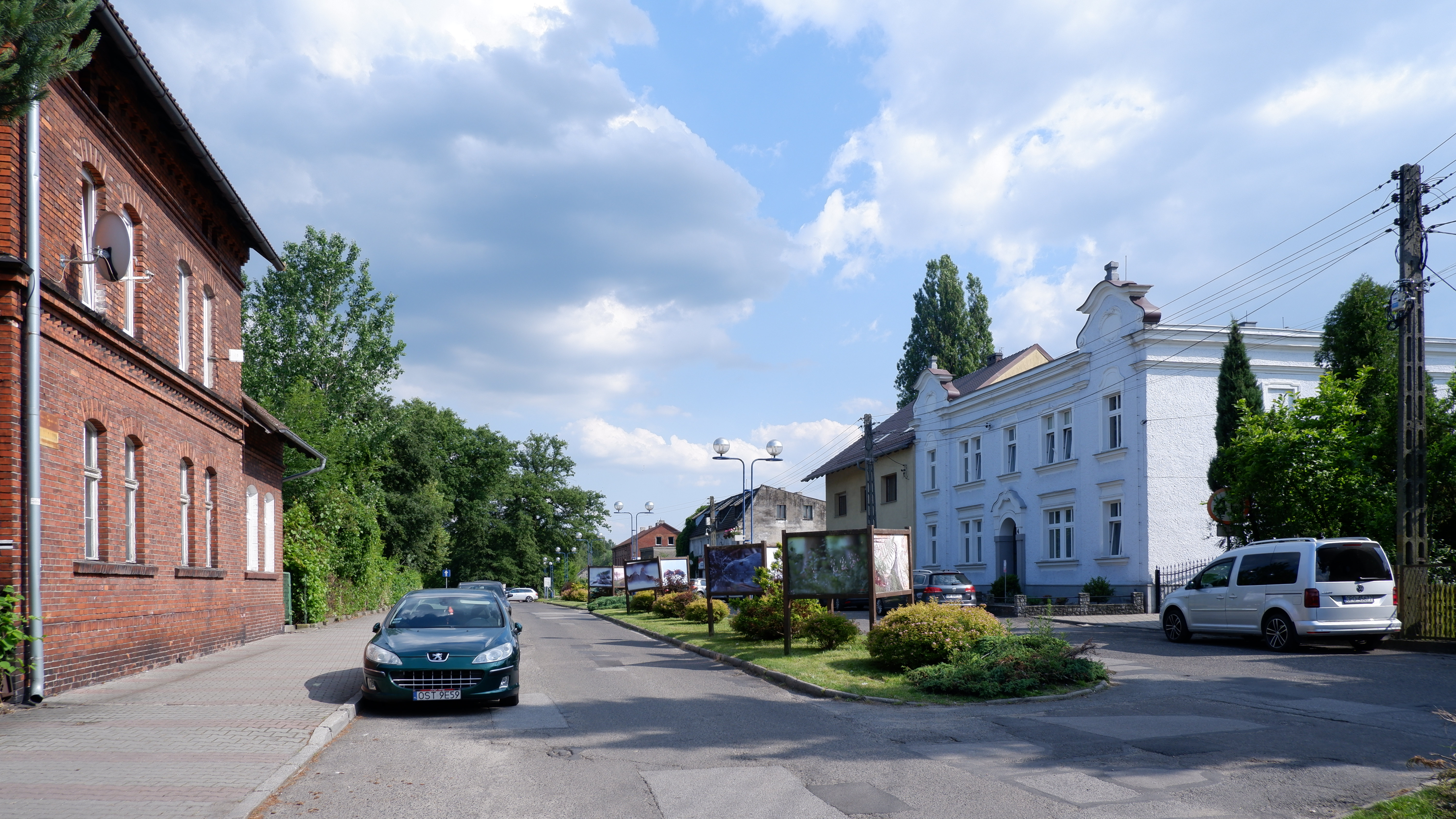
- Dworcowa Street

- Flag Coat of arms

- Location within Poland
- Coordinates: 50°25′9″N 18°7′25″E
- Country: Poland
- Voivodeship: Opole
- County: Krapkowice
- Gmina: Zdzieszowice

Government
  - Mayor: Sybila Zimerman

Area
  - Total: 12.35 km^{2} (4.77 sq mi)

Population (2019-06-30)
  - Total: 11,445
  - Density: 926.7/km^{2} (2,400/sq mi)
- Time zone: UTC+1 (CET)
  - Summer (DST): UTC+2 (CEST)
- Postal code: 47-330
- Car plates: OKR
- Website: http://www.zdzieszowice.pl

Zdzieszowice ([zd͡ʑɛʂɔˈvit͡sɛ]; German: Deschowitz, 1936–1945: Odertal O.S.; Silesian: Źdźyszowicy) is a town in Krapkowice County, Opole Voivodeship, in southern Poland, with 11,445 inhabitants (2019).

== History ==
The synthetic oil plant at "Schaffgotsch Benzin GmbH in Deschowitz-Beuthen, Odertal (Upper Silesia)" began production in 1939 and was a target of the Oil Campaign of World War II.

== Twin towns – sister cities ==
See twin towns of Gmina Zdzieszowice.

== Gallery ==
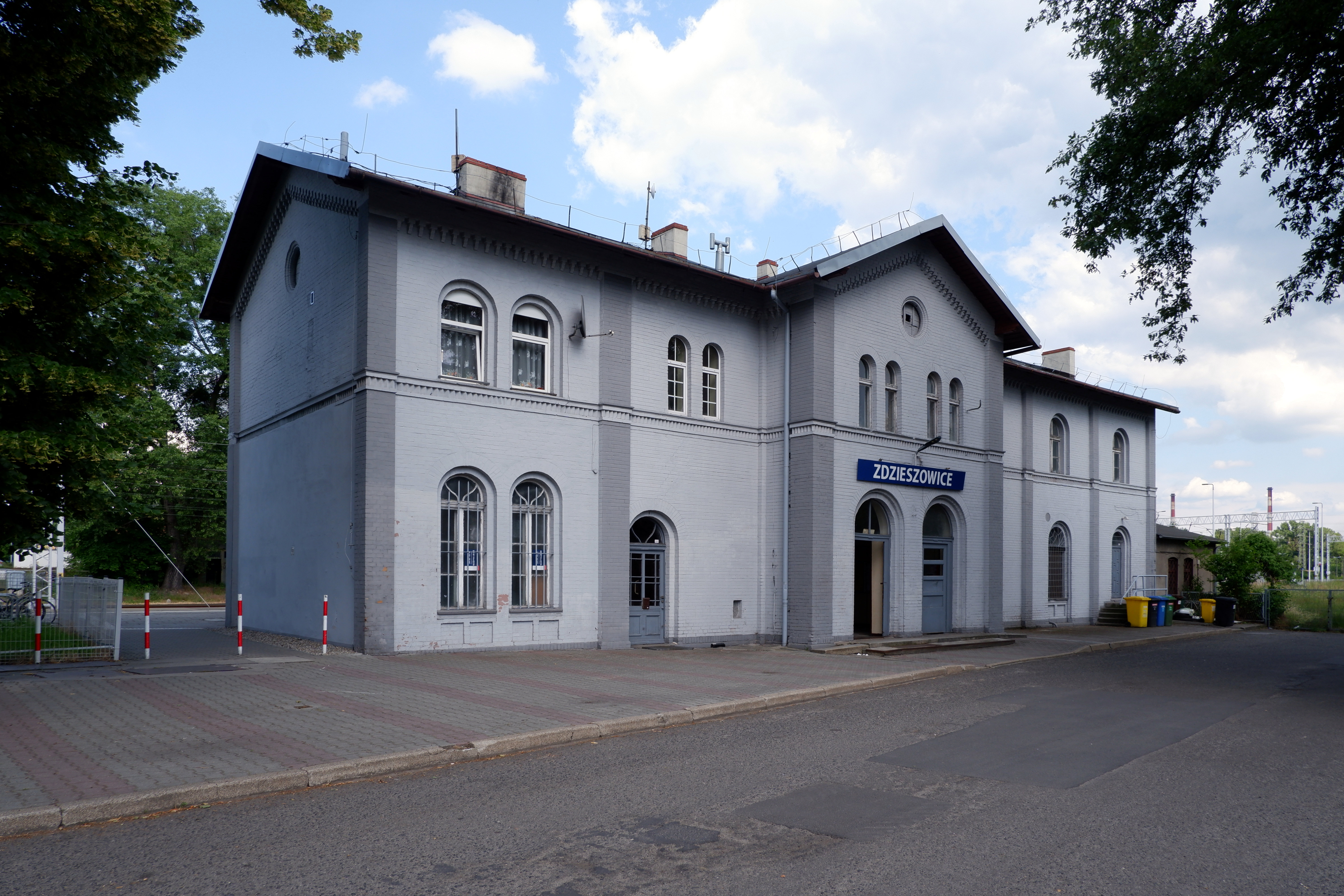
Train station

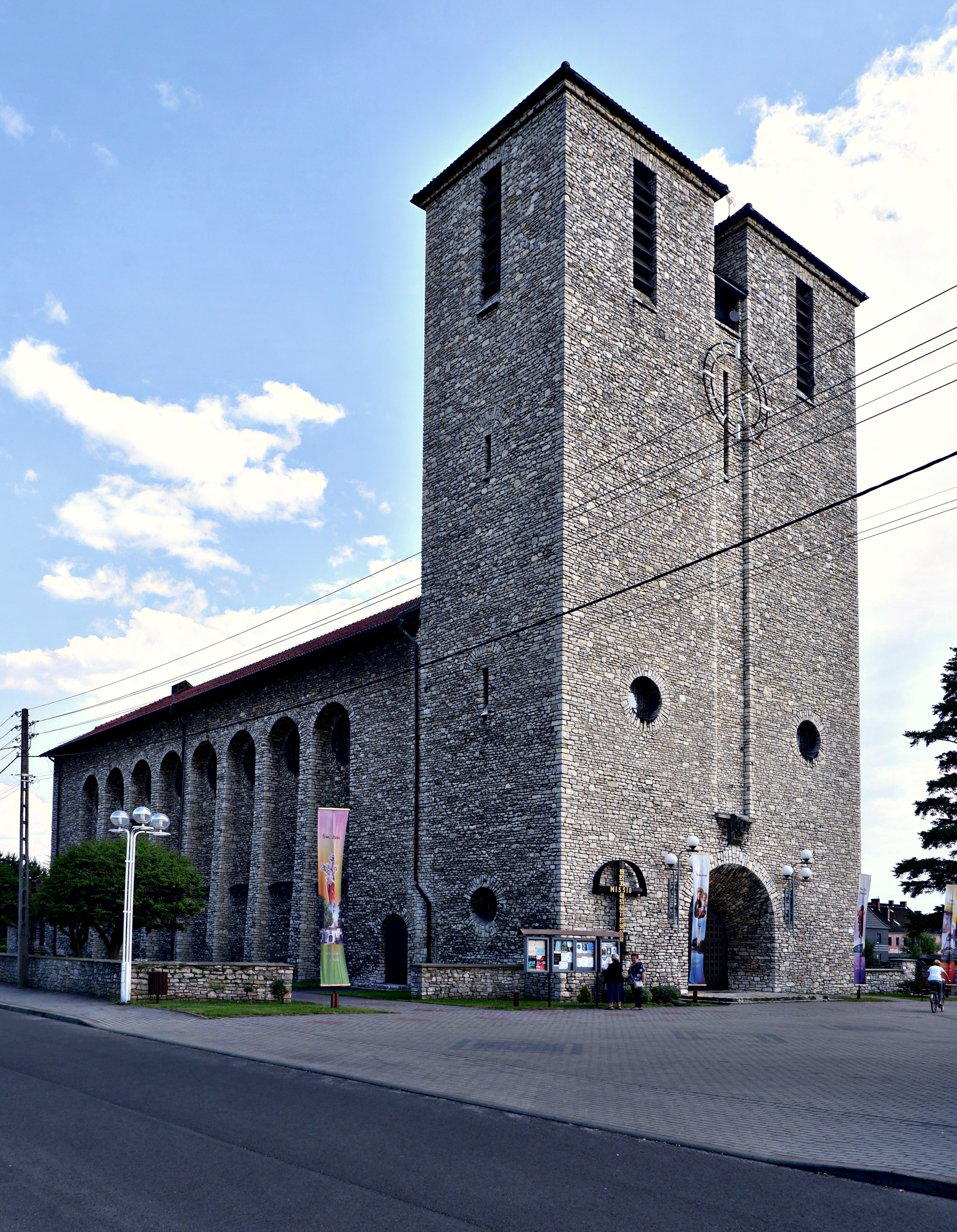
Saint Anthony church

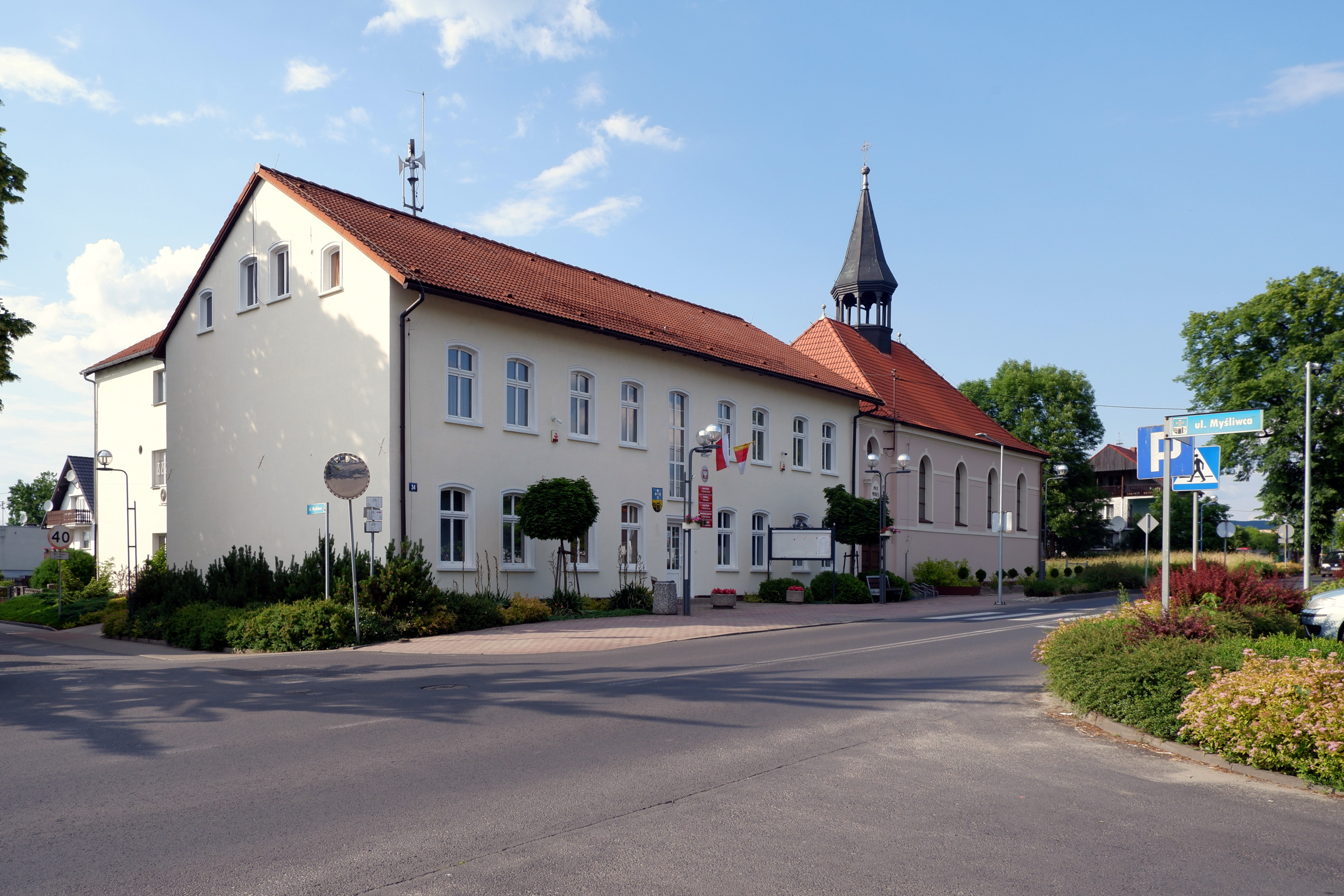
Town hall

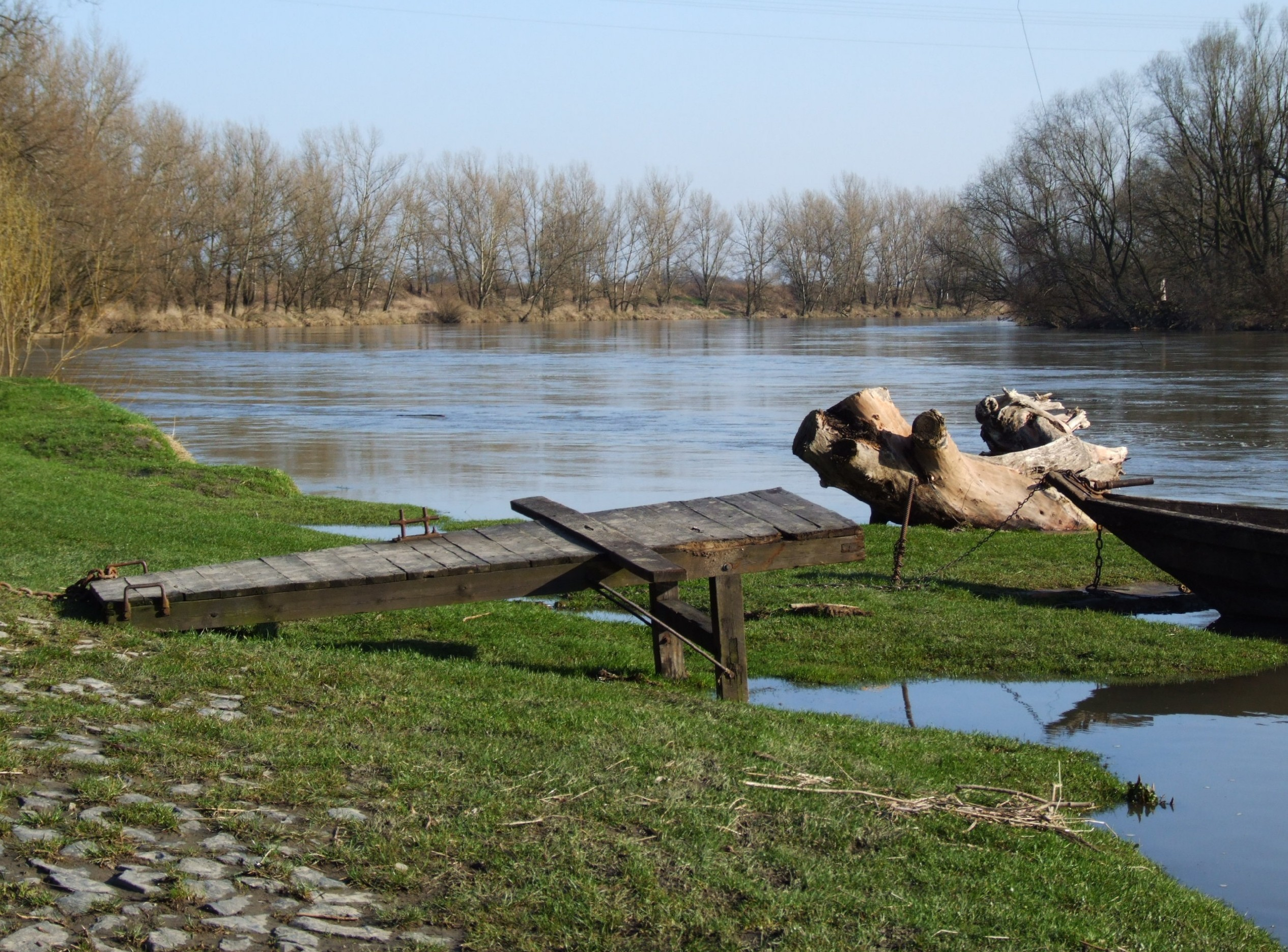
Odra River
