= Pąkowo =

- Settlement
- Location within Poland
- Coordinates: 53°02′52″N 14°33′11″E
- Country: Poland
- Voivodeship: West Pomeranian
- County: Gryfino
- Gmina: Widuchowa
- Postal code: 74-121

Pąkowo [pɔnˈkɔvɔ] (German: Pakows Hof) is a settlement in the administrative district of Gmina Widuchowa, within Gryfino County, West Pomeranian Voivodeship, in north-western Poland, close to the border with Germany.
