= Dębogóra, West Pomeranian Voivodeship =

Dębogóra
- Village
- Location within Poland
- Coordinates: 53°9′N 14°25′E
- Country: Poland
- Voivodeship: West Pomeranian
- County: Gryfino
- Gmina: Widuchowa

Dębogóra [dɛmbɔˈɡura] (German: Brusenfelde) is a village in the administrative district of Gmina Widuchowa, within Gryfino County, West Pomeranian Voivodeship, in north-western Poland, close to the German border. It lies approximately 4 km (2 mi) north-east of Widuchowa, 12 km (7 mi) south of Gryfino, and 32 km (20 mi) south of the regional capital Szczecin.
