= Jasiona, Krapkowice County =

Jasiona
- Village
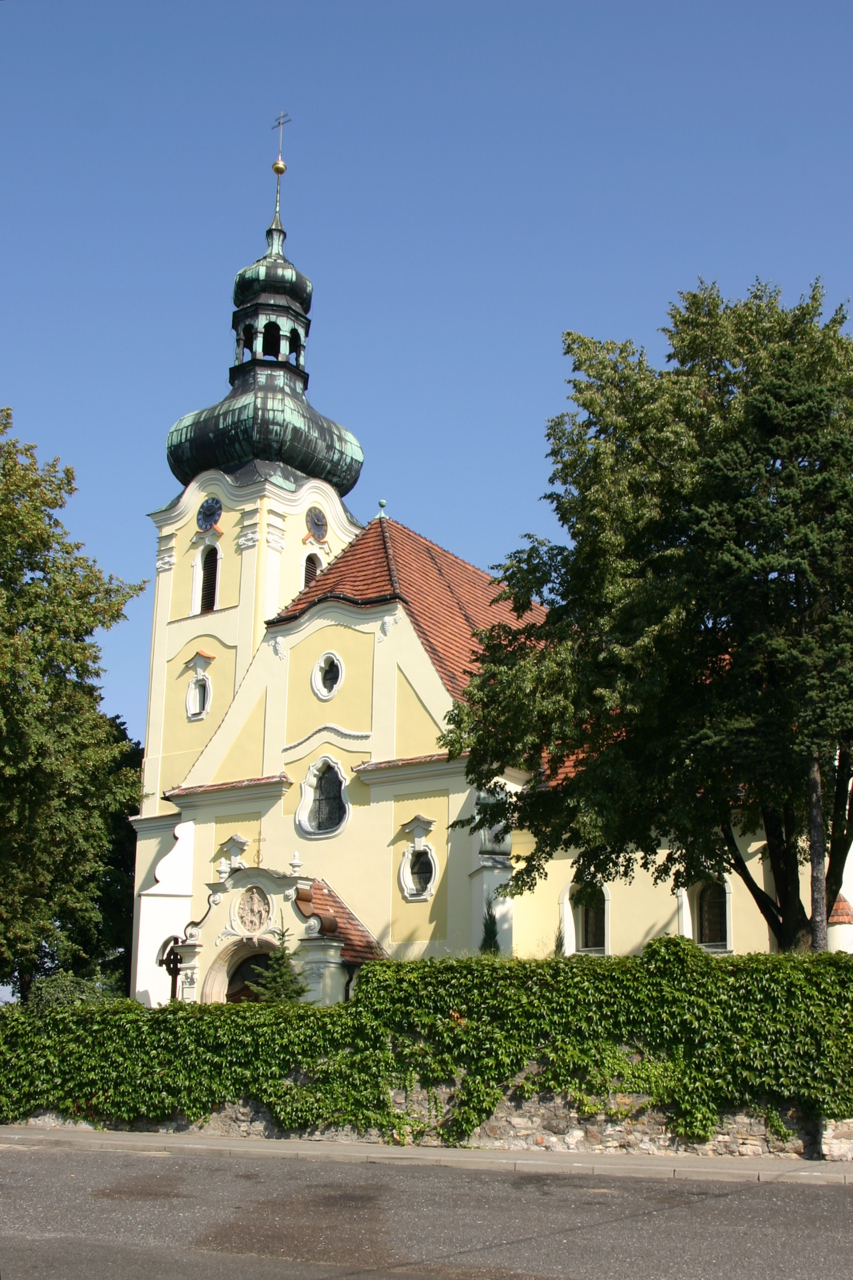

- Location within Poland
- Coordinates: 50°27′44″N 18°06′07″E
- Country: Poland
- Voivodeship: Opole
- County: Krapkowice
- Gmina: Zdzieszowice

Jasiona [jaˈɕɔna] (German: Jeschona) is a village in the administrative district of Gmina Zdzieszowice, within Krapkowice County, Opole Voivodeship, in south-western Poland.
