= Rozwadza =

- Village
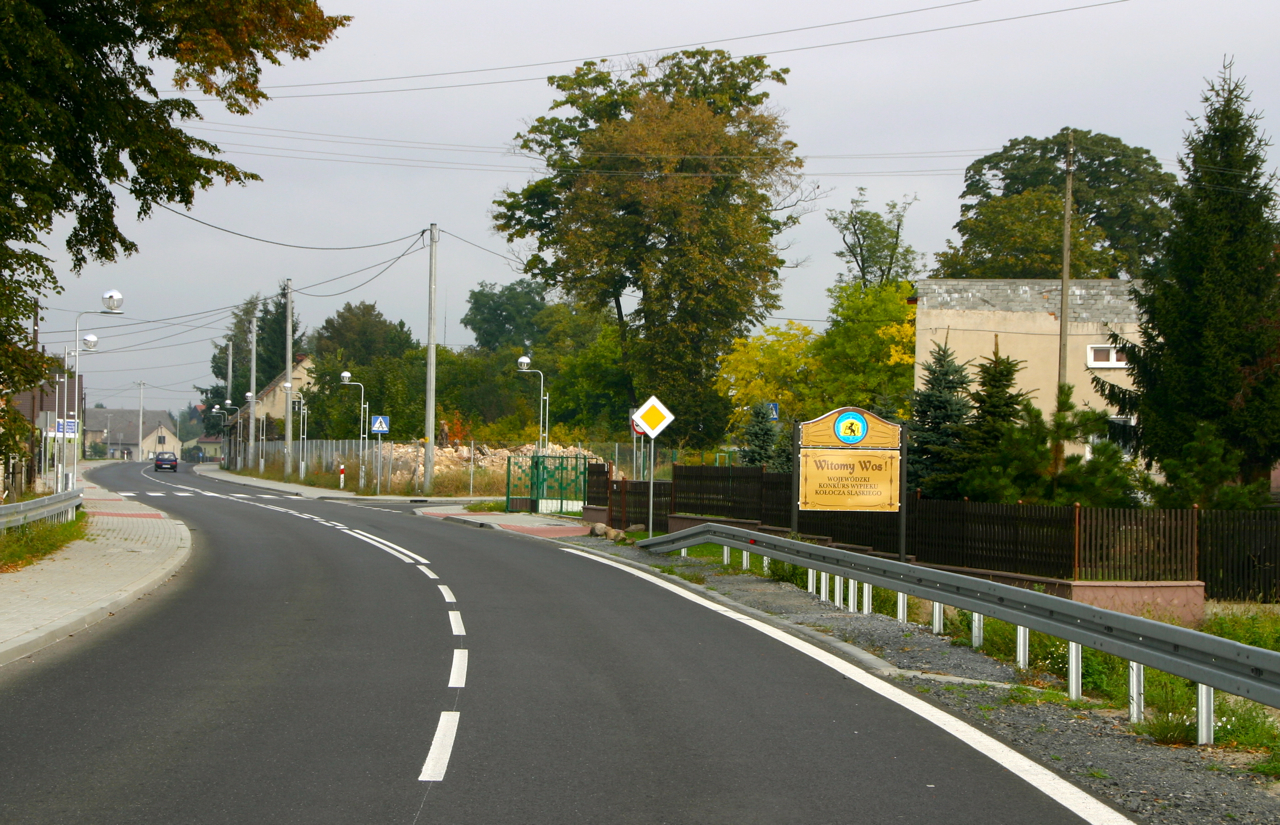

- Location within Poland
- Coordinates: 50°26′N 18°6′E
- Country: Poland
- Voivodeship: Opole
- County: Krapkowice
- Gmina: Zdzieszowice
- Population: 1,100

Rozwadza [rɔzˈvad͡za] (German: Roswadze, 1936–1945 Annengrund) is a village in the administrative district of Gmina Zdzieszowice, within Krapkowice County, Opole Voivodeship, in south-western Poland.
