= Żyrowa =

- Village
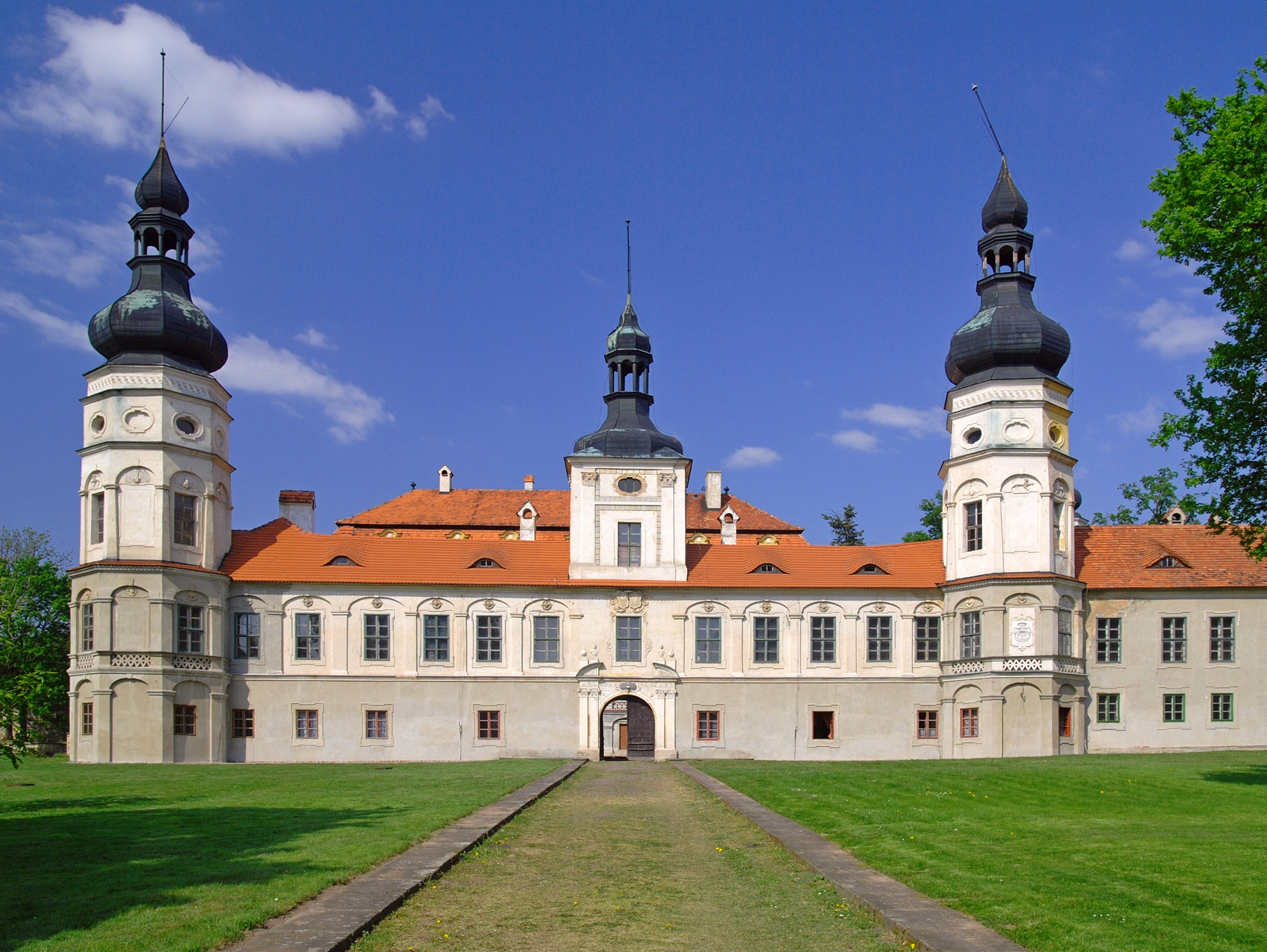
- Palace in Żyrowa

- Location within Poland
- Coordinates: 50°27′N 18°7′E
- Country: Poland
- Voivodeship: Opole
- County: Krapkowice
- Gmina: Zdzieszowice
- Population: 760
- Time zone: UTC+1 (CET)
  - Summer (DST): UTC+2 (CEST)
- Vehicle registration: OKR

Żyrowa [ʐɨˈrɔva] (German: Zyrowa) is a village in the administrative district of Gmina Zdzieszowice, within Krapkowice County, Opole Voivodeship, in southern Poland.

== History ==
The village dates back to the Middle Ages, when it was part of fragmented Piast-ruled Poland. The local Saint Nicholas church was built around 1300. Later on, it was also part of Bohemia (Czechia), Prussia, and Germany. It was the site of fighting during the Polish Third Silesian Uprising against Germany in 1921. In 1936, during a massive Nazi campaign of renaming of placenames, the village was renamed to Buchenhöh to erase traces of Polish origin. During World War II, the Germans operated the E341 forced labour subcamp of the Stalag VIII-B/344 prisoner-of-war camp in the village. After the defeat of Germany in the war, in 1945, the village became again part of Poland and its historic name was restored.

== Transport ==
The Polish A4 motorway runs nearby, northeast of the village.
