= Bolkowice, West Pomeranian Voivodeship =

Bolkowice
- Village
- Location within Poland
- Coordinates: 53°07′55″N 14°27′27″E
- Country: Poland
- Voivodeship: West Pomeranian
- County: Gryfino
- Gmina: Widuchowa

Bolkowice [bɔlkɔˈvit͡sɛ] (German: Wilhelmsfelde) is a village in the administrative district of Gmina Widuchowa, within Gryfino County, West Pomeranian Voivodeship, in north-western Poland, close to the German border.

For the history of the region, see History of Pomerania.
