= Monitor Polski =

Official gazette of the Polish prime minister

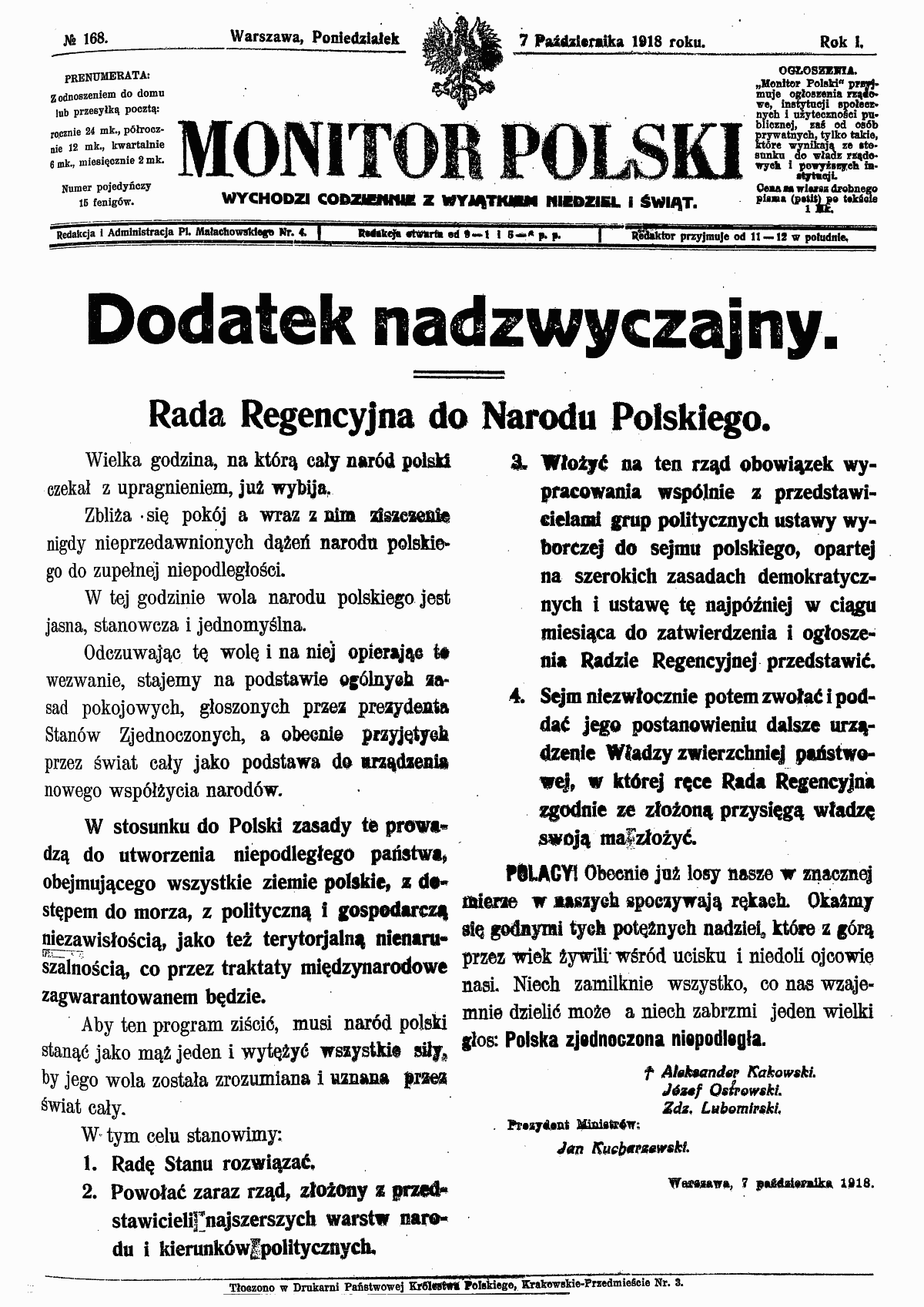
- Language: Polish

Publication details
- History: 1918–present

Standard abbreviations
- ISO 4: Monit. Pol.

Links
- Journal homepage

Monitor Polski (English: Official Gazette of the Republic of Poland, abbreviated M. P. or MP) is a publication of the Prime Minister of the Republic of Poland. The paper was launched in 1918. Between September and December 1939, the government section of the paper was published from France by the exiled government. In 1945 it continued from Poland. Since 1950, it has been published by the office of the Prime Minister to report legislation of the Parliament (Sejm). The paper has two sections: the governmental section which covers orders and decrees and non-governmental section which includes varied materials. Unlike Dziennik Ustaw, the acts published in Monitor are not a source of laws or obligations on the part of Polish citizens.

There is also Monitor Polski B which publishes financial statements of the Republic of Poland.
