= Commission for the Determination of Place Names =

Commission of the Polish Department of Public Administration

- Komisja Ustalania Nazw Miejscowości
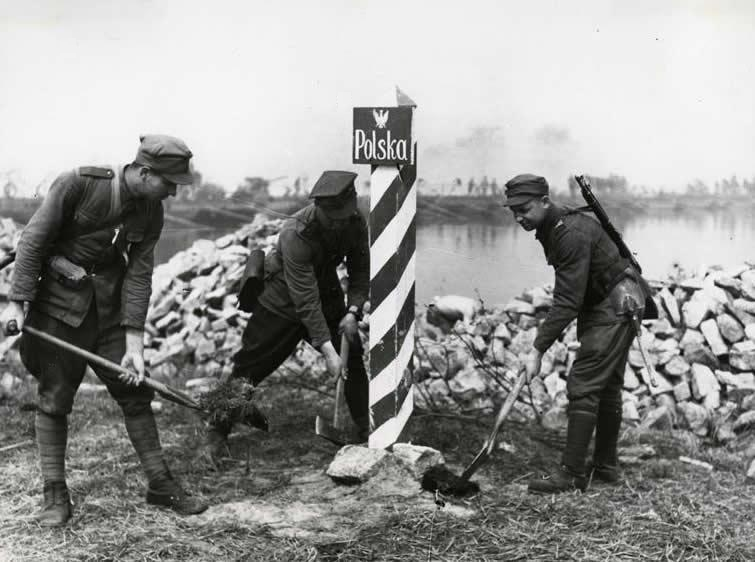
- Marking the new Polish-German border in 1945

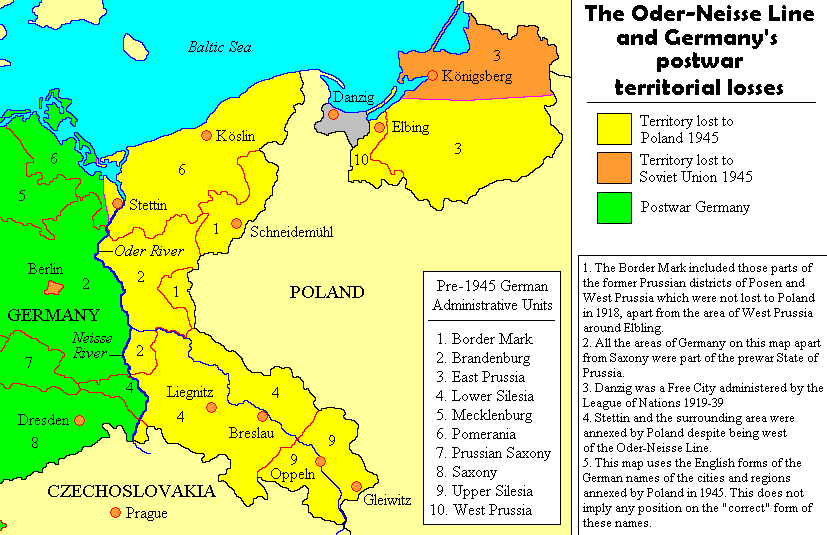
- Areas affected by the decisions of the Committee shown in dark yellow (former eastern territories) and grey (Free City of Danzig)
- Predecessor: Western Institute
- Successor: Komisja Nazw Miejscowości i Obiektów Fizjograficznych; Komisja Standaryzacji Nazw Geograficznych
- Established: January 1946; 80 years ago
- Dissolved: 1960; 66 years ago
- Type: Government commission
- Purpose: Oversight of polonisation of place-names
- Location: Poland
- Region served: Regained Territories
- Official language: Polish
- Chairman: Stanisław Srokowski
- Commission member: Kazimierz Nitsch
- Commission member: Stanisław Rospond
- Commission member: Mikołaj Rudnicki
- Key people: Władysław Semkowicz Witold Taszycki

The Commission for the Determination of Place Names (Polish: Komisja Ustalania Nazw Miejscowości) was a body under the Department of Public Administration, established in January 1946 by the Polish government. It was tasked with assigning Polish or Slavic based toponyms to places such as villages, towns and cities that had borne German names for centuries in the former eastern territories of Germany, referred to in Poland as the Regained Territories. The commission concluded its work and was formally dissolved in 1960.

== Background ==
=== Territory and population ===
According to the decisions of the Potsdam Conference most of the former German territories east of the Oder-Neisse line were placed under Polish administration and most of the remaining German population was expelled. Some of those territories had historical ties with Poland, dating to the medieval fragmentation of Poland in the Duchy of Silesia, but were also populated by German-speaking inhabitants for many centuries.

According to the 1939 German census, the territories were inhabited by 8,855,000 people, including a Polish minority in the territories' easternmost parts. The Polish minority included Masurs in Masuria (former southern East Prussia), Kashubians and Slovincians in Pomerania, and Silesians in Upper Silesia – these groups were referred to as "autochthons" after the war, and used to prove a "Polishness" of the territories. While the German census placed the number of Polish-speakers and bilinguals below 700,000 people, Polish demographers have estimated that the actual number of Poles in the former German East was between 1.2 and 1.3 million. In the 1.2 million figure, approximately 850,000 were estimated for the Upper Silesian regions, 350,000 for southern East Prussia (Masuria) and 50,000 for the rest of the territories.

While the Germans were interned and expelled, close to 5 million settlers were either attracted or forced to settle the areas between 1945 and 1950. An additional 1,104,000 people had declared Polish nationality and were allowed to stay (851,000 of those in Upper Silesia), bringing up the number of Poles to 5,894,600 as of 1950. The Polish government aimed to retain as many "autochthons" as possible for propaganda purposes, as their presence on former German soil was used to indicate the intrinsic "Polishness" of the area and justify its incorporation into the Polish state as "recovered" territories.

The Polish authorities often referred to the medieval Polish state to emphasize the validity of the Polish historical claim to these lands and began to call the area the Recovered Territories. The arriving Polish administration and settlers faced the problem of a consistent and unambiguous usage of toponyms.

=== Former toponyms ===
When the area was settled by Germans during the medieval Ostsiedlung, they either introduced new German toponyms or adopted pre-existing ones, which were of Baltic or West Slavic origin—Baltic Old Prussian and Slavic Pomeranian in the North, and Slavic Silesian, Slavic Polish and Sorbian in the South. In bi- and multi-lingual areas such as Upper Silesia, German and Slavic (including Polish) variants often existed for the same toponym, derived either from a Slavic root (e.g., Opole—Oppeln) or a German root (e.g., Reichenbach—Rychbach).

Beginning with the 19th-century Kulturkampf, many toponyms with Slavic roots were renamed to sound more German. In 1938, many place names of Slavic or Old Prussian origin in East Prussia and Silesia were renamed to purely "German" toponyms by Nazi Germany. These renamings intensified during World War II, when Germany had sought to completely eradicate Polish culture in these lands.

=== Early renaming in 1945 ===
Initially there were several ways of naming like continuing to use the German names, pronouncing and spelling the German names in a more Polish way (Zechow→Czechów, Boyadel→Bojadła, Poberow→Pobierowo, Grabow→Grabowo); a literal translation of the German names (Eichberg→Dębogóra (oak mountain), Grünwalde→Zielenica (Green wood), Linde→Lipka (linden); giving names according to the places topographical characters (Górki→mountainous); giving names honouring a local person or event (e.g. Sensburg→Mrągowo, to commemorate Christoph Mrongovius, Lötzen→Giżycko, to commemorate Gustaw Gizewiusz, Rastenburg→Kętrzyn, to commemorate Wojciech Kętrzyński) or adopting the name of the settler's homeland. Another purpose was to restore a historical Polish (or Slavic) name that dated to pre-Germanization times.

Spared from the expulsion of Germans from Poland were about 900,000 Masurians and Silesians, usually speaking Polish and Silesian dialects mixed with German loanwords. Accordingly, these groups had their own, traditional Masurian or Silesian names for various toponyms (e.g. Johannisburg→Jańsbork, Rastenburg→Rastembork, Lötzen→Lec, Liegnitz→Lignica). Often however these names didn't comply with the maxims of the committee and were usually not considered. Hence the decisions of the committee were not always accepted by the local population, which sometimes protested against the new names with boycotts and even demolition of road signs. The locals rated the actions of the Committee rather as Polonisation against their will. In other cases the arriving Polish settlers requested not to use the committee's suggestion but e.g. to name a village after the settler's first-born child (Stefanówka for Nieder Giersdorf/Miłochów).

In many cases a single place had three or even four names and even administrative districts (Voivodships) like the area of the former Free City of Danzig had four different names: morskie, kaszubskie, gdańskie and wiślane.

Sometimes even different administrative branches like the municipal office, the local office and the railway administration used different names, e.g. modern Dzierżoniów in Lower Silesia was called Rychbach, Reichenbach and Drobniszew at the same time. This problem was later solved by naming the town in memory of Jan Dzierzon.

=== 1945 conference ===
In early April 1945, the Regional Bureau of the National Railway Administration in Poznań founded a commission for the standardization of place names along the Oder River. This initiative was supported by the Western Institute and Poznań University, which in July 1945 published a bilingual Słowniczek nazw miejscowych (Small Dictionary of Place Names).

Again on the initiative of the Regional Railway Administration in Poznań, the first Onomastic Conference was organized at Szczecin and held on 11–13 September 1945, attended by 37 representatives of Poznań University, the Western Institute, the Baltic Institute in Gdańsk (which had just moved there from Toruń) and the administrations of Szczecin, Poznań and Gdańsk, as well as members of information and propaganda institutions and the postal service.

The Conference achieved a general consensus for a systematic method of considering place names:

- To be used as a principal source was Słownik geograficzny Królestwa Polskiego i innych krajów słowiańskich (Geographical Dictionary of the Kingdom of Poland and of Other Slavic Countries), which had been published in the late nineteenth century.
- If a name had several forms in medieval sources, the one that was nearest to the contemporary written Polish should be adopted.
- Translation of German names into Polish should be avoided.
- With ancient names, the first two declension cases and the adjectival form should be provided in the interest of correct usage.
- In cases when there were only German names, Slavic names in the neighboring area could be adopted. If there were no nearby Slavic names, the name of the new settlers' former native area could be adopted, with a slight modification.

== The Commission ==
Pursuant to this, in January 1946 a Commission for the Determination of Place Names (Komisja Ustalania Nazw Miejscowości) was founded as a commission of the Department of Public Administration. It comprised a chair and 6 commission members, including three scholars and three officials of the Departments of Transportation, Posts and Defense. The first chairman was the geographer and former director of the Baltic Institute, Stanisław Srokowski. The other commission members were the linguists Kazimierz Nitsch, Mikołaj Rudnicki, Stanisław Rospond and Witold Taszycki; a specialist in toponyms; and the historian Władysław Semkowicz.

The Commission coordinated the work of local institutions such as the Western Institute in Poznań, the Silesian Institute in Katowice, and the Baltic Institute in Gdańsk. Three regional subcommissions were founded, each responsible for a given area:

- Kraków Commission I: responsible for Silesia;
- Kraków Commission II: responsible for the former East Prussia and Free City of Danzig; and the
- Poznań Commission: responsible for the former Farther Pomerania and Neumark.

The subcommissions prepared recommendations for the commission, which ultimately endorsed up to 98 per cent of their proposals, which were often based on prewar publications of the Western Institute, such as Stanisław Kozierowski's Atlas nazw geograficznych Słowiańszczyzny Zachodniej (Atlas of Geographical Names of Western Slavdom).

Following approval by the commission, a place name had to be accepted by the Departments of Public Administration and of the Recovered Territories, and finally was published in the Monitor Polski (Polish Monitor).

The commission's first conference took place on 2–4 March 1946. It decided the names of voivodships and 220 cities, counties, transportation crossroads, and towns with populations over 5,000.

The second conference, on 1–3 June 1946, dealt with towns with populations between 1,000 and 5,000; and the third, on 26 September 8 October 1946 decided the names of villages with a population between 500 and 1,000. By the end of 1946, the commission had adopted about 4,400 place names; and by June 1947, nearly all names of stations and settlements with a population of over 500. By the end of 1950, a total of 32,138 place names had been determined by the commission.

After the commission's chairman, Srokowski, died in 1950, the village of Drengfurt, which had initially been renamed "Dryfort", was changed to "Srokowo".

== At present ==
Currently there are two commissions in Poland, tasked with standardization of toponyms: Komisja Nazw Miejscowości i Obiektów Fizjograficznych (the Commission for Names of Places and Physiographic Objects) and Komisja Standaryzacji Nazw Geograficznych (the Commission for Standardization of Geographic Names).

== See also ==
- Territorial changes of Poland
- List of towns in Farther Pomerania
- Prontuario dei nomi locali dell'Alto Adige
- Former toponyms in Greece
