= Baltic Institute =

Polish scientific society

The Baltic Institute (Polish: Instytut Bałtycki) in Gdańsk is a scientific society researching the topics of the Baltic Sea countries, maritime economic issues, and Polish-German and Polish-Scandinavian relations.

== History ==
The Baltic Institute was established in 1925 in Toruń, beginning real activities in 1927, with the main goal of documenting the Polish heritage in Pomerania after 100 years of German occupation and Germanization practices. In 1931 a branch was established in Gdynia. During the German occupation of Poland in World War II the institute was abolished by the Nazis.

The Baltic Institute was re-established in 1945 with its headquarters first in Bydgoszcz, Sopot and then in Gdańsk. New branches were opened in Gdynia, Sopot, Toruń, Bydgoszcz and Szczecin. During the big reorganization of the scientific societies in Pomerania, in 1950 the institute became a part of the Western Institute in Poznań, but was made independent again in 1958 with its headquarters in Gdańsk.

== Research areas ==
The Baltic Institute conducts research in the following areas:

- knowledge of Scandinavia, and Polish-Scandinavian relations.
- Polish-German relation, especially related to Gdańsk Pomerania and the Baltic Sea area.
- the newest history and economic cooperation in the Baltic Sea area after World War II.

== Main publications ==
- Komunikaty Instytutu Bałtyckiego (The Baltic Institute Messages)
- Gdańskie Zeszyty Humanistyczne (Gdansk Humanistic Volumes)
