= Widuchowa, West Pomeranian Voivodeship =

Widuchowa
- Village
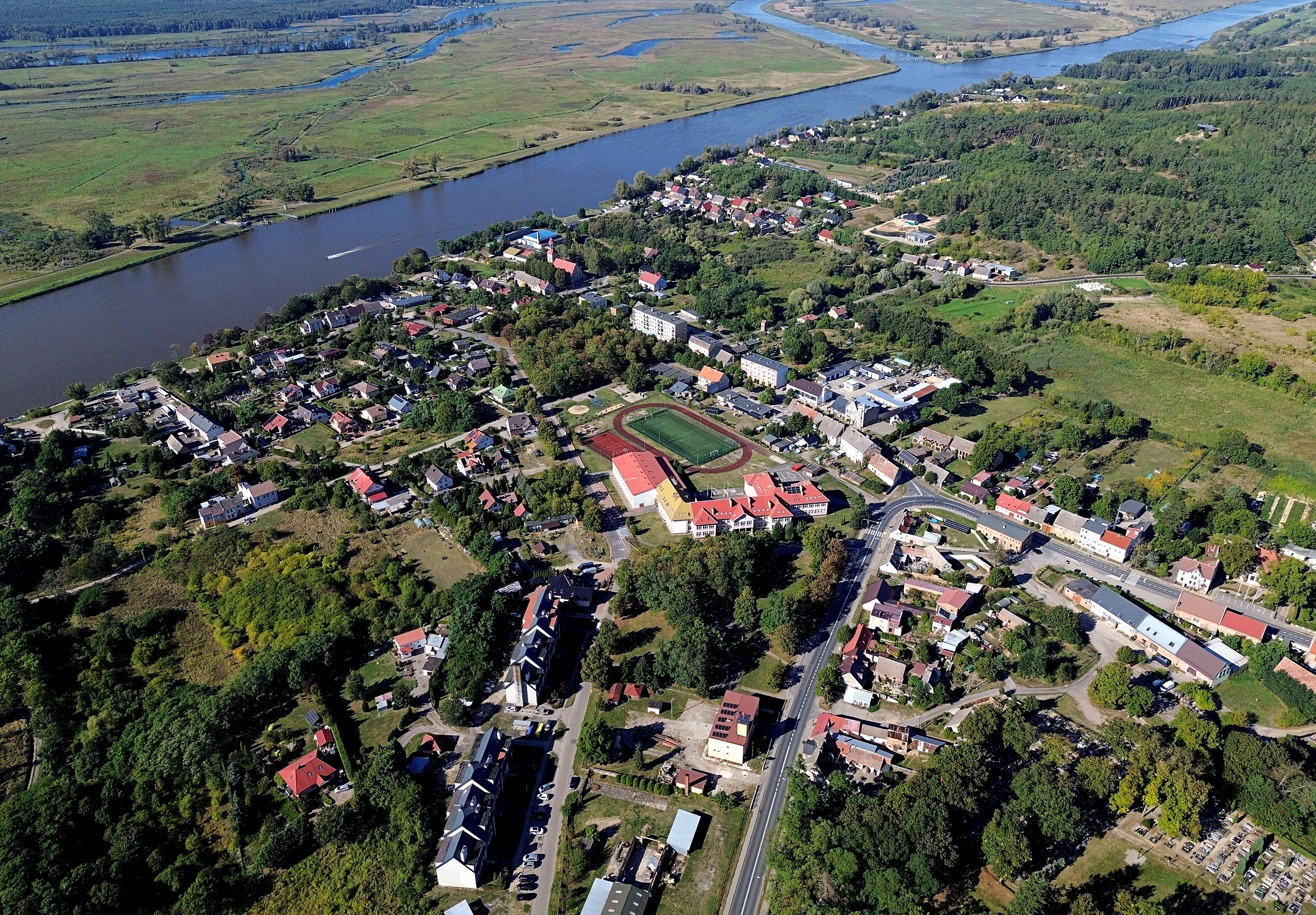
- Aerial view of Widuchowa

- Location within Poland
- Coordinates: 53°7′40″N 14°23′20″E
- Country: Poland
- Voivodeship: West Pomeranian
- County: Gryfino
- Gmina: Widuchowa
- Time zone: UTC+1 (CET)
  - Summer (DST): UTC+2 (CEST)
- Vehicle registration: ZGR

Widuchowa [viduˈxɔva] (German: Fiddichow) is a village in Gryfino County, West Pomeranian Voivodeship, in north-western Poland, close to the German border. It is the seat of the gmina (administrative district) called Gmina Widuchowa. It lies approximately 15 km (9 mi) south-west of Gryfino and 35 km (22 mi) south of the regional capital Szczecin.

Historically, it was known in Polish as Widuchowa and Widuchowo.

== Notable residents ==
- Gustav Kleikamp (1896–1952), German admiral
