= Tywa =

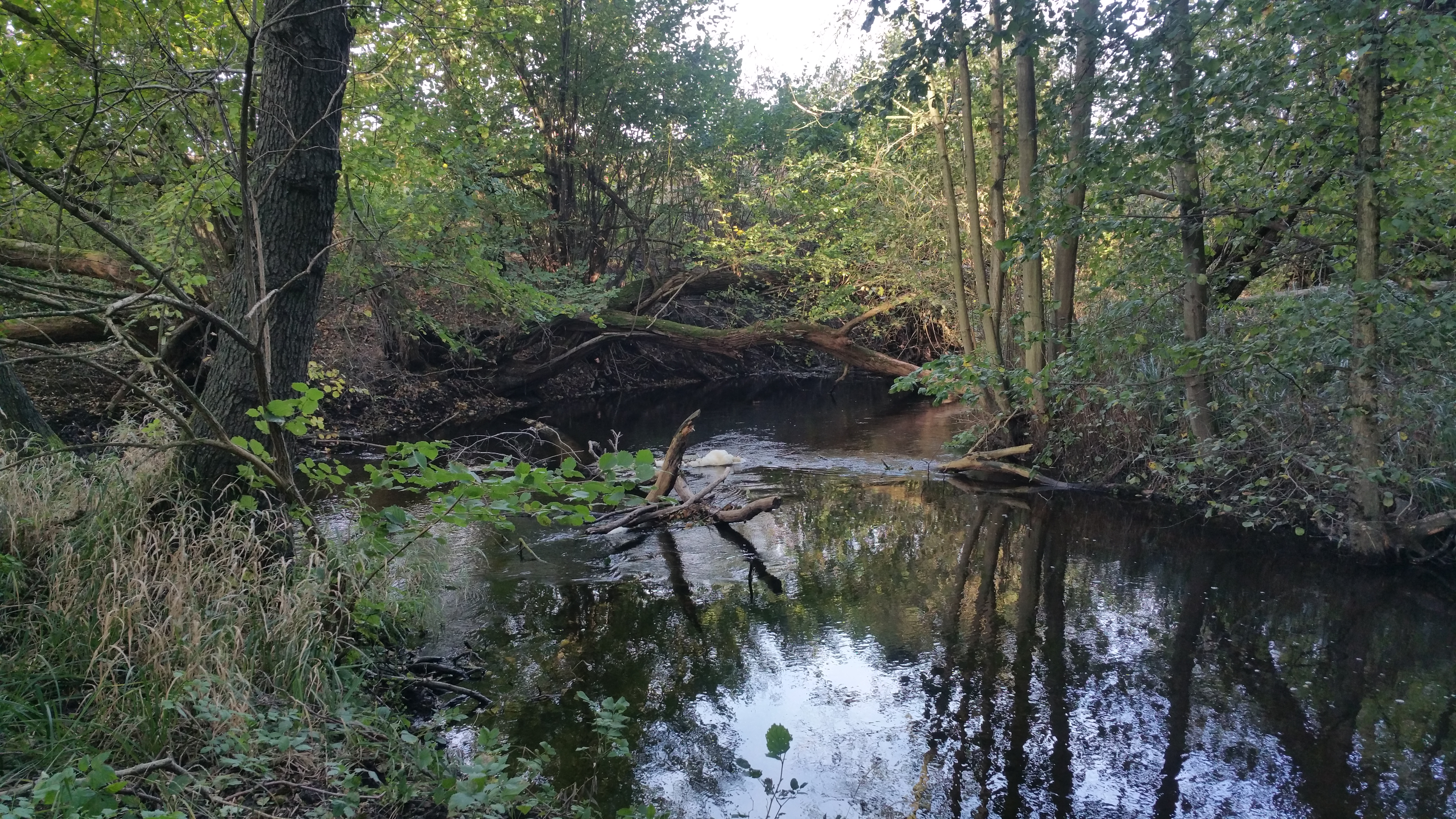

Location
- Country: Poland

Physical characteristics
- Source
  - location: Góralice to the south of Trzcińsko-Zdrój
- Mouth
  - location: East Oder
  - coordinates: 53°13′52″N 14°28′39″E
- Length: 47.9 km (29.8 mi)
- Basin size: 264.5 km^{2} (102.1 sq mi)
- Discharge
  - average: 0.71 m^{3}/s (25 cu ft/s)

Basin features
- Progression: East Oder→ Oder→ Baltic Sea

The Tywa is a river in north-western Poland, a tributary of the East Oder river with a length of 47.9 kilometres (29.8 mi) and catchment area of 264.5 square kilometres (102.1 sq mi). It flows from Lake Myślibórz the Plain Wełtyńską (at Coastland Szczecin), in Western Pomerania.

The river flows from a small lake south of Trzcińsko-Zdrój, through eight ribbon lakes (the largest of which is Lake Banská), and the Eastern Oder passes south of Gryfino, where its waters are used to cool the Dolna Odra Power Plant. Larger towns nearby include Trzcińsko-Zdroj, Strzeszów, Swobnica, Lubanowo, and Tywica.

SNQ reliable flow calculated for the section of the mouth of the river is 0.71 cubic metres per second (25 cu ft/s). It has some of the highest waterfalls in Western Pomerania.
