= Trzaski =

Trzaski may refer to the following places:

- Trzaski, Kuyavian-Pomeranian Voivodeship (north-central Poland)
- Trzaski, Łomża County in Podlaskie Voivodeship (north-east Poland)
- Trzaski, Wysokie Mazowieckie County in Podlaskie Voivodeship (north-east Poland)
- Trzaski, Ostrołęka County in Masovian Voivodeship (east-central Poland)
- Trzaski, Żuromin County in Masovian Voivodeship (east-central Poland)
- Trzaski, Greater Poland Voivodeship (west-central Poland)
- Trzaski, Gryfino County in West Pomeranian Voivodeship (north-west Poland)
- Trzaski, Łobez County in West Pomeranian Voivodeship (north-west Poland)
