= Parnica =

Parnica may refer to:

- Parnica, Gryfino County, Poland
- Parnica, Szczecinek County, Poland
- Párnica, Slovakia
- Parnica (Maglaj), Bosnia and Herzegovina
