= Czyste, West Pomeranian Voivodeship =

Czyste
- Village
- Location within Poland
- Coordinates: 52°58′35″N 14°41′50″E
- Country: Poland
- Voivodeship: West Pomeranian
- County: Gryfino
- Gmina: Trzcińsko-Zdrój

Czyste [ˈt͡ʂɨstɛ] is a village in the administrative district of Gmina Trzcińsko-Zdrój, within Gryfino County, West Pomeranian Voivodeship, in north-western Poland. It lies approximately 6 km (4 mi) east of Trzcińsko-Zdrój, 34 km (21 mi) south-east of Gryfino, and 50 km (31 mi) south of the regional capital Szczecin.

For the history of the region, see History of Pomerania.
