= Cieplikowo =

- Village
- Location within Poland
- Coordinates: 52°59′25″N 14°40′41″E
- Country: Poland
- Voivodeship: West Pomeranian
- County: Gryfino
- Gmina: Trzcińsko-Zdrój

Cieplikowo [t͡ɕɛpliˈkɔvɔ] (German: Sandkrug) is a village in the administrative district of Gmina Trzcińsko-Zdrój, within Gryfino County, West Pomeranian Voivodeship, in north-western Poland. It lies approximately 5 km (3 mi) north-east of Trzcińsko-Zdrój, 32 km (20 mi) south-east of Gryfino, and 48 km (30 mi) south of the regional capital Szczecin.

For the history of the region, see History of Pomerania.
