= Drzesz =

- Settlement
- Location within Poland
- Coordinates: 52°57′16″N 14°36′26″E
- Country: Poland
- Voivodeship: West Pomeranian
- County: Gryfino
- Gmina: Trzcińsko-Zdrój

Drzesz [dʐɛʂ] (German Falkenthal) is a settlement in the administrative district of Gmina Trzcińsko-Zdrój, within Gryfino County, West Pomeranian Voivodeship, in north-western Poland. It lies approximately 2 km (1 mi) south-west of Trzcińsko-Zdrój, 34 km (21 mi) south of Gryfino, and 52 km (32 mi) south of the regional capital Szczecin.
