= Chełm Dolny =

- Village
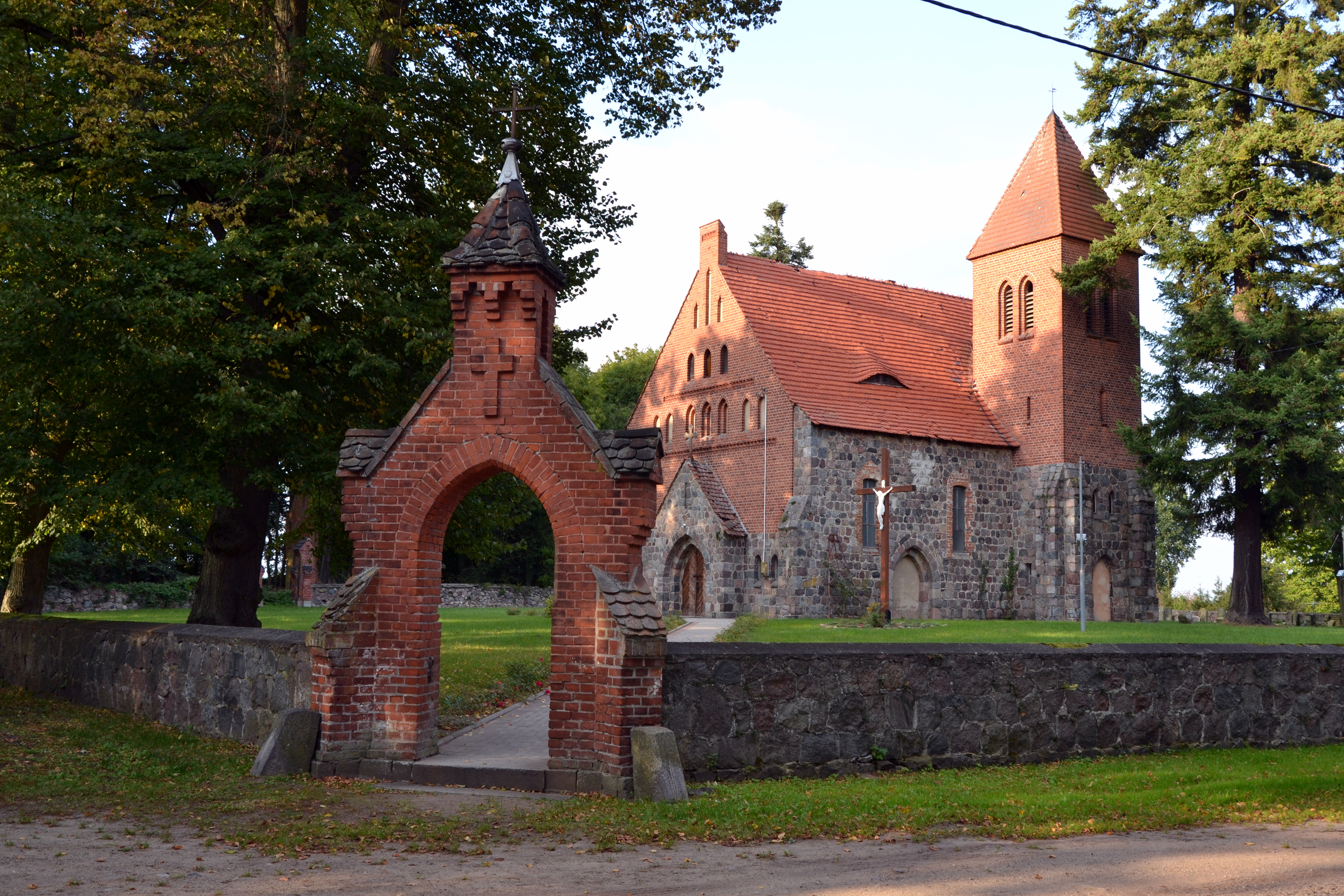

- Location within Poland
- Coordinates: 52°52′N 14°36′E
- Country: Poland
- Voivodeship: West Pomeranian
- County: Gryfino
- Gmina: Trzcińsko-Zdrój

Chełm Dolny (Polish pronunciation: [xɛwm ˈdɔlnɨ]; German: Wartenberg) is a village in the administrative district of Gmina Trzcińsko-Zdrój, within Gryfino County, West Pomeranian Voivodeship, in north-western Poland. It lies approximately 12 km (7 mi) south of Trzcińsko-Zdrój, 44 km (27 mi) south of Gryfino, and 62 km (39 mi) south of the regional capital Szczecin.

For the history of the region, see History of Pomerania.

Henning von Tresckow grew up in Wartenberg and was buried at the local cemetery, which was destroyed after World War II.
