= Górczyn, West Pomeranian Voivodeship =

Górczyn
- Village
- Location within Poland
- Coordinates: 52°55′39″N 14°34′5″E
- Country: Poland
- Voivodeship: West Pomeranian
- County: Gryfino
- Gmina: Trzcińsko-Zdrój

Górczyn [ˈɡurt͡ʂɨn] (German: Gehege) is a village in the administrative district of Gmina Trzcińsko-Zdrój, within Gryfino County, West Pomeranian Voivodeship, in north-western Poland. It lies approximately 6 km (4 mi) south-west of Trzcińsko-Zdrój, 37 km (23 mi) south of Gryfino, and 55 km (34 mi) south of the regional capital Szczecin.

For the history of the region, see History of Pomerania.
