= Tchórzno =

- Village
- Location within Poland
- Coordinates: 52°56′13″N 14°45′6″E
- Country: Poland
- Voivodeship: West Pomeranian
- County: Gryfino
- Gmina: Trzcińsko-Zdrój

Tchórzno [ˈtxuʐnɔ] is a village in the administrative district of Gmina Trzcińsko-Zdrój, within Gryfino County, West Pomeranian Voivodeship, in north-western Poland. It lies approximately 10 km (6 mi) east of Trzcińsko-Zdrój, 40 km (25 mi) south-east of Gryfino, and 55 km (34 mi) south of the regional capital Szczecin.

== See also ==
History of Pomerania
