= Antoniewice =

- Village
- Location within Poland
- Coordinates: 52°56′27″N 14°35′56″E
- Country: Poland
- Voivodeship: West Pomeranian
- County: Gryfino
- Gmina: Trzcińsko-Zdrój

Antoniewice [antɔɲɛˈvit͡sɛ] is a village in the administrative district of Gmina Trzcińsko-Zdrój, within Gryfino County, West Pomeranian Voivodeship, in north-western Poland. It lies approximately 4 km (2 mi) south-west of Trzcińsko-Zdrój, 36 km (22 mi) south of Gryfino, and 53 km (33 mi) south of the regional capital Szczecin.

For the history of the region, see History of Pomerania.
