= Dłużyna, West Pomeranian Voivodeship =

Dłużyna
- Village
- Location within Poland
- Coordinates: 53°5′42″N 14°42′31″E
- Country: Poland
- Voivodeship: West Pomeranian
- County: Gryfino
- Gmina: Banie

Dłużyna [dwuˈʐɨna] (German Marienaue) is a village in the administrative district of Gmina Banie, within Gryfino County, West Pomeranian Voivodeship, in north-western Poland. It lies approximately 3 km (2 mi) east of Banie, 23 km (14 mi) south-east of Gryfino, and 37 km (23 mi) south of the regional capital Szczecin.

For the history of the region, see History of Pomerania.
