= Dłusko Gryfińskie =

- Village
- Location within Poland
- Coordinates: 53°1′N 14°40′E
- Country: Poland
- Voivodeship: West Pomeranian
- County: Gryfino
- Gmina: Banie

Dłusko Gryfińskie [ˈdwuskɔ ɡrɨˈfiɲskʲɛ] (German Linde) is a village in the administrative district of Gmina Banie, within Gryfino County, West Pomeranian Voivodeship, in north-western Poland. It lies approximately 10 km (6 mi) south of Banie, 29 km (18 mi) south-east of Gryfino, and 45 km (28 mi) south of the regional capital Szczecin.

For the history of the region, see History of Pomerania.
