= Rosnowo =

Rosnowo may refer to the following places:

- Rosnowo, Greater Poland Voivodeship (west-central Poland)
- Rosnowo, Gryfino County in West Pomeranian Voivodeship (north-west Poland)
- Rosnowo, Koszalin County in West Pomeranian Voivodeship (north-west Poland)
