= Klasztorne =

Klasztorne may refer to the following places:

- Klasztorne, Pomeranian Voivodeship (north Poland)
- Klasztorne, Choszczno County in West Pomeranian Voivodeship (north-west Poland)
- Klasztorne, Gryfino County in West Pomeranian Voivodeship (north-west Poland)
