= Górnowo =

- Village
- Location within Poland
- Coordinates: 53°2′47″N 14°40′24″E
- Country: Poland
- Voivodeship: West Pomeranian
- County: Gryfino
- Gmina: Banie

Górnowo [ɡurˈnɔvɔ] (German Gornow) is a village in the administrative district of Gmina Banie, within Gryfino County, West Pomeranian Voivodeship, in north-western Poland. It lies approximately 7 km (4 mi) south of Banie, 26 km (16 mi) south-east of Gryfino, and 42 km (26 mi) south of the regional capital Szczecin.

For the history of the region, see History of Pomerania.
