= Dobropole, Gryfino County =

Dobropole
- Village
- Location within Poland
- Coordinates: 52°56′44″N 14°43′7″E
- Country: Poland
- Voivodeship: West Pomeranian
- County: Gryfino
- Gmina: Trzcińsko-Zdrój
- Population: 134

Dobropole [dɔbrɔˈpɔlɛ] (German: Dobberphul) is a village in the administrative district of Gmina Trzcińsko-Zdrój, within Gryfino County, West Pomeranian Voivodeship, in north-western Poland. It lies approximately 8 km (5 mi) east of Trzcińsko-Zdrój, 38 km (24 mi) south-east of Gryfino, and 54 km (34 mi) south of the regional capital Szczecin.

For the history of the region, see History of Pomerania.

The village has a population of 134.
