= Piaseczno, Gmina Banie =

Piaseczno
- Village
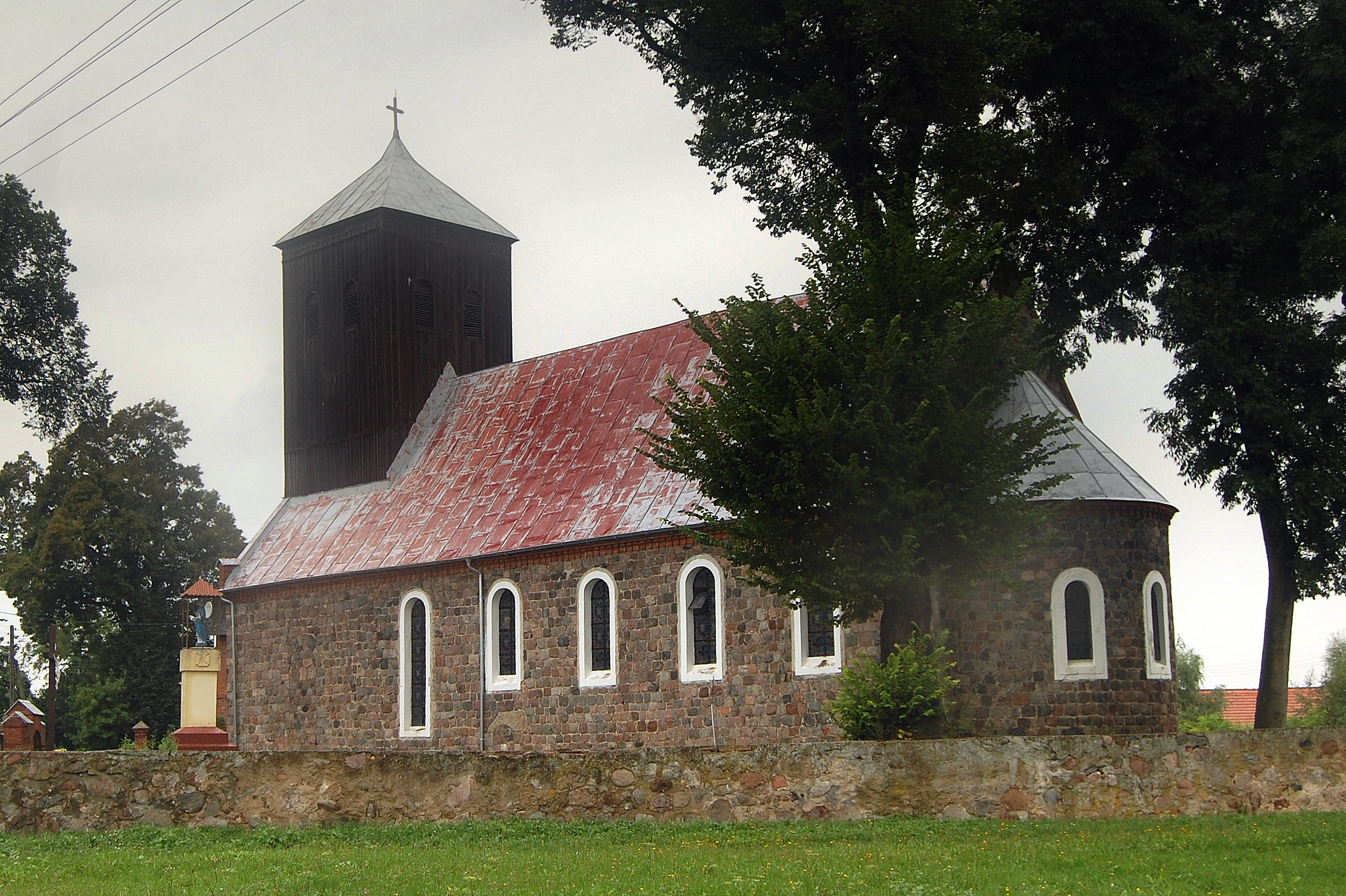
- Church of Our Lady of the Rosary

- Location within Poland
- Coordinates: 53°3′38″N 14°42′3″E
- Country: Poland
- Voivodeship: West Pomeranian
- County: Gryfino
- Gmina: Banie

Population
  - Total: 410
- Website: http://www.banie.pl

Piaseczno [pjaˈsɛt͡ʂnɔ] (German Neuendorf) is a village in the administrative district of Gmina Banie, within Gryfino County, West Pomeranian Voivodeship, in north-western Poland. It lies approximately 5 km (3 mi) south-east of Banie, 26 km (16 mi) south-east of Gryfino, and 41 km (25 mi) south of the regional capital Szczecin.

For the history of the region, see History of Pomerania.

The village has a population of 410.
