= Sosnowo, Gryfino County =

Sosnowo
- Village
- Location within Poland
- Coordinates: 53°8′N 14°39′E
- Country: Poland
- Voivodeship: West Pomeranian
- County: Gryfino
- Gmina: Banie
- Population: 150

Sosnowo [sɔsˈnɔvɔ] is a village in the administrative district of Gmina Banie, within Gryfino County, West Pomeranian Voivodeship, in north-western Poland. It lies approximately 4 km (2 mi) north of Banie, 18 km (11 mi) south-east of Gryfino, and 32 km (20 mi) south of the regional capital Szczecin.

For the history of the region, see the History of Pomerania.
