= Otoki, West Pomeranian Voivodeship =

Otoki
- Settlement
- Location within Poland
- Coordinates: 53°8′4″N 14°38′38″E
- Country: Poland
- Voivodeship: West Pomeranian
- County: Gryfino
- Gmina: Banie

Otoki [ɔˈtɔki] is a settlement in the administrative district of Gmina Banie, within Gryfino County, West Pomeranian Voivodeship, in north-western Poland. It lies approximately 5 km (3 mi) north-west of Banie, 17 km (11 mi) south-east of Gryfino, and 32 km (20 mi) south of the regional capital Szczecin.

For the history of the region, see History of Pomerania.
