= Baniewice =

- Village
- Location within Poland
- Coordinates: 53°4′N 14°36′E
- Country: Poland
- Voivodeship: West Pomeranian
- County: Gryfino
- Gmina: Banie

Baniewice [baɲɛˈvit͡sɛ] (German Marienthal) is a village in the administrative district of Gmina Banie, within Gryfino County, West Pomeranian Voivodeship, in north-western Poland. It lies approximately 6 km (4 mi) south-west of Banie, 22 km (14 mi) south of Gryfino, and 39 km (24 mi) south of the regional capital Szczecin.

For the history of the region, see History of Pomerania.
