= Kunowo, Gryfino County =

Kunowo
- Village
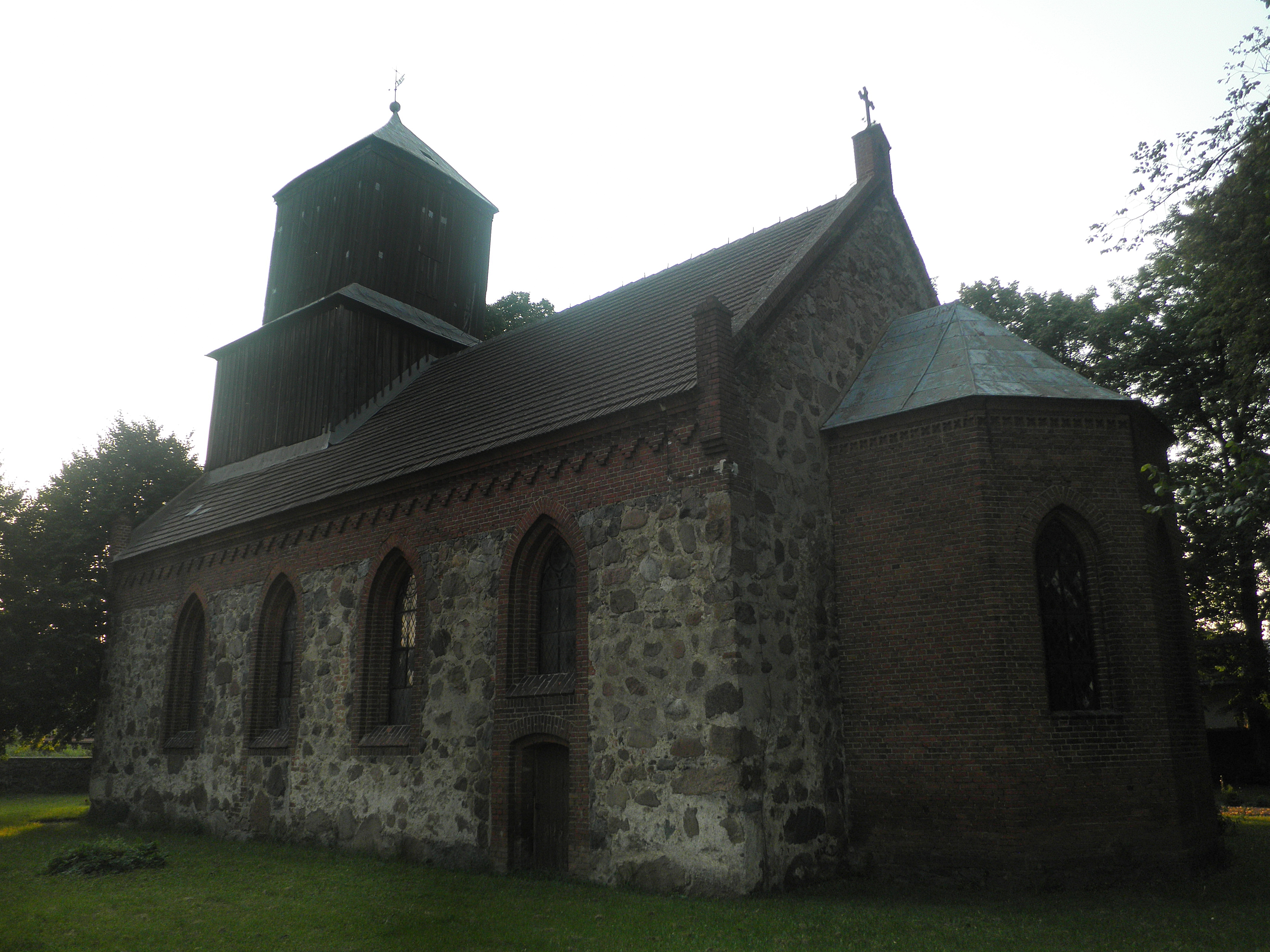
- Church of Saint Adalbert

- Location within Poland
- Coordinates: 53°8′34″N 14°42′17″E
- Country: Poland
- Voivodeship: West Pomeranian
- County: Gryfino
- Gmina: Banie

Population
  - Total: 360

Kunowo [kuˈnɔvɔ] (German: Kunow) is a village in the administrative district of Gmina Banie, within Gryfino County, West Pomeranian Voivodeship, in north-western Poland. It lies approximately 6 km (4 mi) north-east of Banie, 19 km (12 mi) south-east of Gryfino, and 32 km (20 mi) south of the regional capital Szczecin.

The village has a population of 360.

== See also ==
- History of Pomerania
