= Wesoła, West Pomeranian Voivodeship =

Wesoła
- Settlement
- Location within Poland
- Coordinates: 52°56′15″N 14°41′56″E
- Country: Poland
- Voivodeship: West Pomeranian
- County: Gryfino
- Gmina: Trzcińsko-Zdrój
- Time zone: UTC+1 (CET)
  - Summer (DST): UTC+2 (CEST)

Wesoła [vɛˈsɔwa] (German Vorwerk Schönlinde) is a settlement in the administrative district of Gmina Trzcińsko-Zdrój, within Gryfino County, West Pomeranian Voivodeship, in north-western Poland. It lies approximately 7 km (4 mi) south-east of Trzcińsko-Zdrój, 38 km (24 mi) south-east of Gryfino, and 54 km (34 mi) south of the regional capital Szczecin.
