= Rożnowo, West Pomeranian Voivodeship =

Rożnowo
- Village
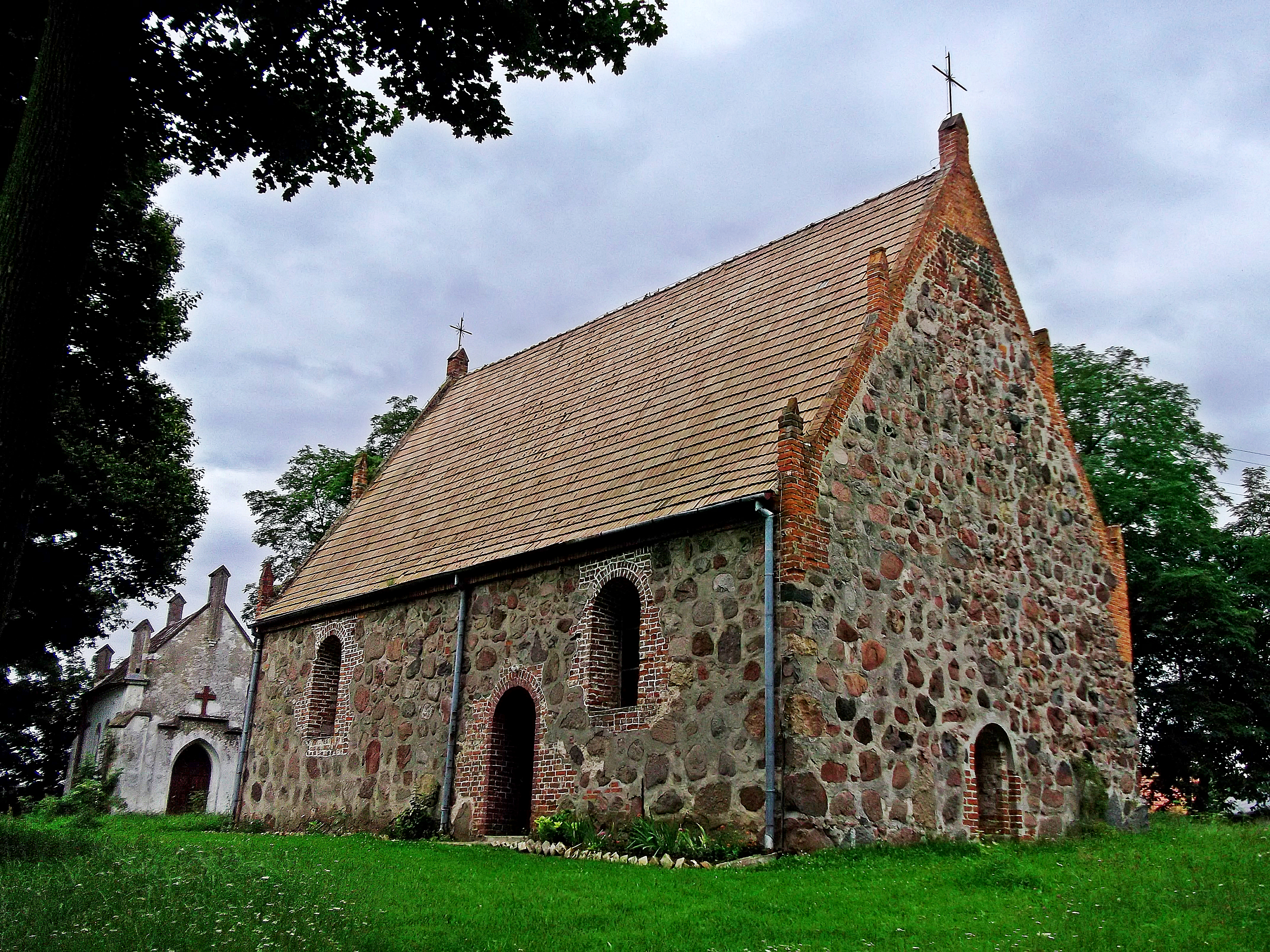
- Church of Our Lady of Częstochowa

- Location within Poland
- Coordinates: 53°9′N 14°35′E
- Country: Poland
- Voivodeship: West Pomeranian
- County: Gryfino
- Gmina: Banie

Rożnowo [rɔʐˈnɔvɔ] (German: Rosenfelde) is a village in the administrative district of Gmina Banie, within Gryfino County, West Pomeranian Voivodeship, in north-western Poland. It lies approximately 8 km (5 mi) north-west of Banie, 13 km (8 mi) south-east of Gryfino, and 30 km (19 mi) south of the regional capital Szczecin.

For the history of the region, see History of Pomerania.
