= Piaseczno, Gmina Trzcińsko-Zdrój =

Piaseczno
- Village
- Location within Poland
- Coordinates: 52°54′33″N 14°39′11″E
- Country: Poland
- Voivodeship: West Pomeranian
- County: Gryfino
- Gmina: Trzcińsko-Zdrój

Piaseczno [pjaˈsɛt͡ʂnɔ] is a village in the administrative district of Gmina Trzcińsko-Zdrój, within Gryfino County, West Pomeranian Voivodeship, in north-western Poland. It lies approximately 7 km (4 mi) south of Trzcińsko-Zdrój, 40 km (25 mi) south of Gryfino, and 57 km (35 mi) south of the regional capital Szczecin.

For the history of the region, see History of Pomerania.
