= Górny Młyn, West Pomeranian Voivodeship =

Górny Młyn
- Settlement
- Location within Poland
- Coordinates: 53°7′37″N 14°37′55″E
- Country: Poland
- Voivodeship: West Pomeranian
- County: Gryfino
- Gmina: Banie
- Population: 0

Górny Młyn [ˈɡurnɨ ˈmwɨn] is a former settlement in the administrative district of Gmina Banie, within Gryfino County, West Pomeranian Voivodeship, in north-western Poland. It lies approximately 4 km (2 mi) north-west of Banie, 17 km (11 mi) south-east of Gryfino, and 33 km (21 mi) south of the regional capital Szczecin.

For the history of the region, see History of Pomerania.
