= Piaszno, West Pomeranian Voivodeship =

Piaszno
- Hamlet
- Location within Poland
- Coordinates: 53°04′21″N 14°43′57″E
- Country: Poland
- Voivodeship: West Pomeranian
- County: Gryfino
- Municipality: Banie
- Time zone: UTC+1 (CET)
  - Summer (DST): UTC+2 (CEST)
- Area code: +48 91
- Car plates: ZGR

Piaszno (Polish: [ˈpjaʂ.nɔ]), also known as Nowa Wieś (Polish: [ˈnɔ.va ˈvjɛɕ], lit. 'New Village'), and Paszno (Polish: [ˈpaʂ.nɔ]), is a hamlet in the West Pomeranian Voivodeship, Poland, located within the municipality of Banie in Gryfino County.
