= Strzeszów =

Strzeszów may refer to the following places in Poland:

- Strzeszów, Lower Silesian Voivodeship (south-west Poland)
- Strzeszów, West Pomeranian Voivodeship (north-west Poland)
