= Storm Aurore =

Extratropical cyclone in October 2021

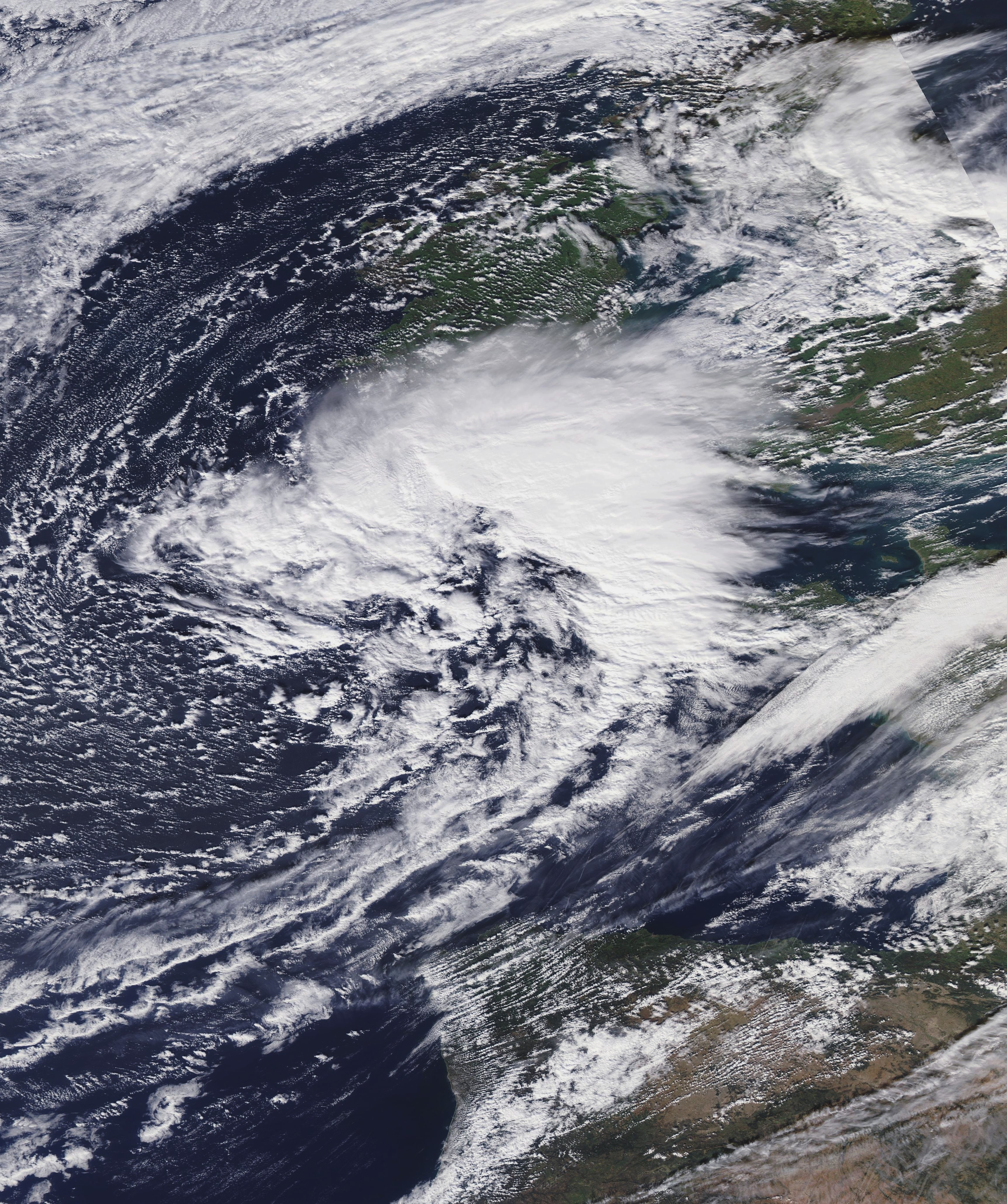
- Storm Aurore while located to the south of Ireland on 20 October

Meteorological history
- Formed: 20 October 2021
- Dissipated: 23 October 2021

Extratropical cyclone European windstorm
- Highest gusts: 175 km/h (109 mph) in Fecamp, Normandy
- Lowest pressure: 970 mb (970 hPa)

F1 tornado
- on the Fujita scale

Overall effects
- Fatalities: 6
- Damage: ≥$100 million (2021 USD)
- Areas affected: United Kingdom, France, Czech Republic, Poland, Netherlands, Germany, Russia, Denmark
- Power outages: >525,000
- Part of the 2021–22 European windstorm season

Storm Aurore was a notably early extratropical cyclone in late October 2021 that impacted several areas of Europe, causing substantial damages. The third named storm of the 2021–22 European windstorm season, Aurore was first noted on 20 October by Meteo France over the Atlantic Ocean, south of Ireland. As the system moved over central Europe on the next day, it subsequently merged with another extratropical cyclone named Hendrik before moving across central Europe, in which it brought several destruction across the region. It then was last noted on 23 October.

Gusts of 175 km/h (109 mph) were recorded in an area in Normandy, the highest in association with the storm. Many trees across the affected areas felled, while over half a million people lost electricity. Public establishments were also closed as a precaution to winds and flooding. Flash floods also affected the U.K. and a total of six deaths were confirmed from the system: Four in Poland, one in the United Kingdom and another in Germany. Damages were estimated by the Aon Benfield at greater than or equal to $100 million.

== Meteorological history ==
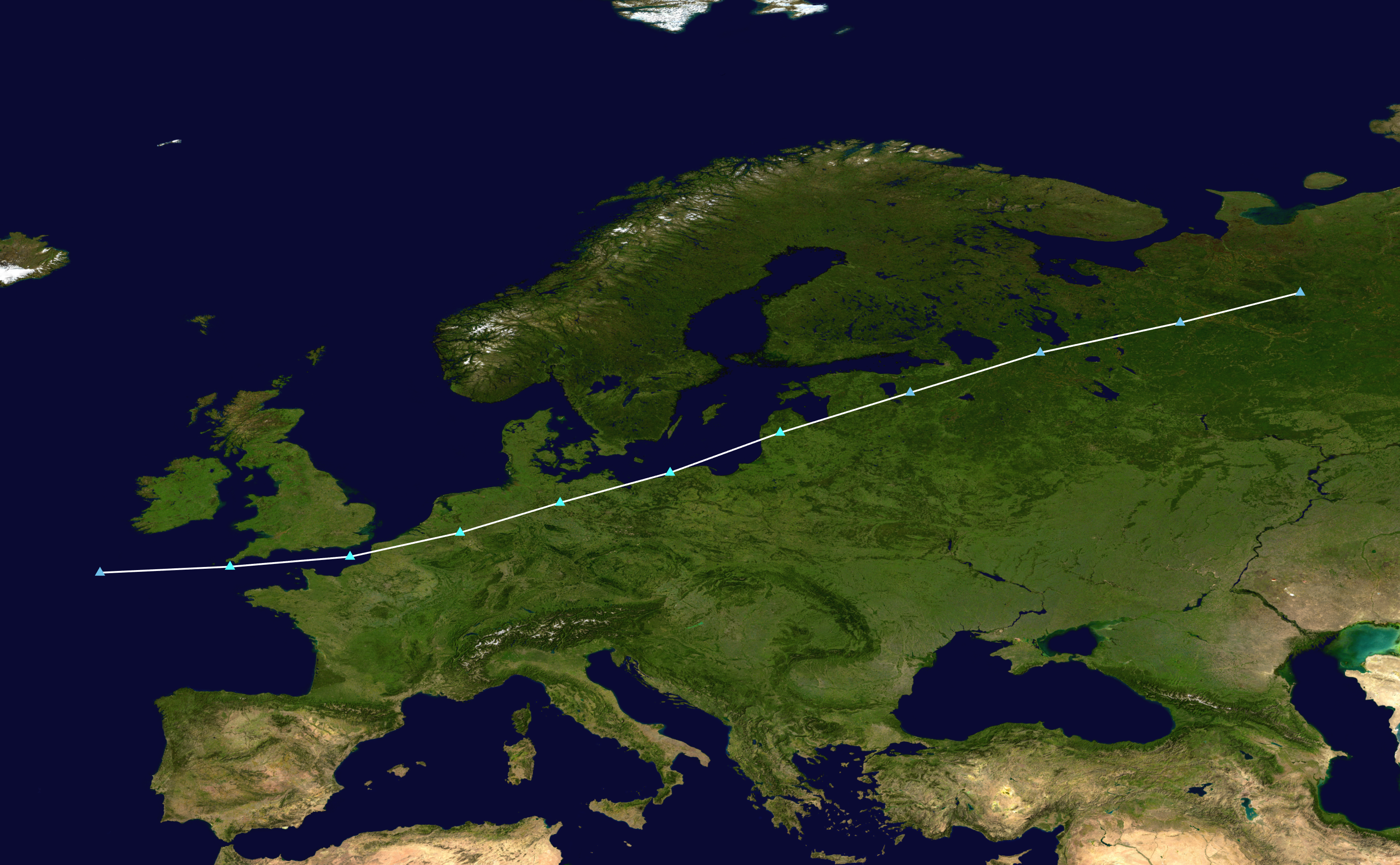
Map plotting the storm's track and intensity, according to the Saffir–Simpson scale Map key Saffir–Simpson scale Tropical depression (≤38 mph, ≤62 km/h) Tropical storm (39–73 mph, 63–118 km/h) Category 1 (74–95 mph, 119–153 km/h) Category 2 (96–110 mph, 154–177 km/h) Category 3 (111–129 mph, 178–208 km/h) Category 4 (130–156 mph, 209–251 km/h) Category 5 (≥157 mph, ≥252 km/h) Unknown Storm type Tropical cyclone Subtropical cyclone Extratropical cyclone, remnant low, tropical disturbance, or monsoon depression

A strong extratropical cyclone over the north Atlantic Ocean was named Hendrik I by the Free University of Berlin on 16 October. At the same time, the FUB assigned another system near the cyclone Hendrik II. On the next day, the first system remained stationary over the central Atlantic, while the second one moved near France. Both systems interacted with each other on 18 October before the first cyclone became absorbed with the second, two days later. At that day, the Météo-France officially named it Aurore from its naming lists as it entered the English Channel as it continued to strengthen, unleashing powerful wind gusts across its path. It then entered the North Sea and swept northern Netherlands and Germany on the next day before moving northeastwards. It then was last noted on 23 October.

== Impacts ==
=== France ===
In France, storm warnings were put in place by the Météo-France for Aurore, with an orange wind warning being issued on 21 October. The cyclone first impacted the Atlantic coast of Brittany, downing and uprooting trees and damaging roofs across the area. In Fecamp, Normandy winds reached 175 kilometres per hour (109 mph), the highest in association with the storm. As of 21 October, power electric utility Enedis reported over 250,000 households that are without electricity due to Aurore. Along Normandy, Champagne-Ardennes, Paris, and Île-de-France, train services were disrupted while an under-construction house in Plozévet, Finistère. Granville, Manche reported gusts of 143 kilometres per hour (89 mph) and Groix, Morbihan at 134 kilometres per hour (83 mph). Telephone lines were also affected and several bridges across the affected portion of the country were unpassable for vehicles or their lanes being closed. High tides also inundated several stores at Landerneau, Finistère. Three tornadoes, likely spawned by the storm were recorded in Plozévet, Riec-sur-Belon and Kernascléden. The overall catastrophe was caught many French people in surprise.

=== United Kingdom ===
A yellow rainfall warning was issued for the United Kingdom for Aurore until 21 October. Flood warnings were also established due to the storm. The Thames Barrier was closed on that day to refrain London from possible flooding. The Essex fire service reported over 120 calls due to flooding incidents. A section of the M23 motorway between Crawley and Pease Pottage was also closed as a result of flooding. More than 50 millimetres (2 in) of rainfall from the storm impacted portions of Southern England, with Somerset at 51.4 millimetres (2.02 in) from 20–21 October and Knockholt, Kent at 58 millimetres (2.3 in). A man in East Grinstead, West Sussex was killed while two others were injured seriously and another two, minor due to a car accident when his car smashed into a tree. Two more cars collided with each other in Farnborough, Hants, but it is unknown whether it caused fatalities or additional injuries. In total, 53 red flood warnings and 117 flood alerts were implemented in the country. In Woking, high winds caused cladding panels from the under construction Victoria Square skyscraper to fall to the street, resulting in evacuations but no injuries. Meanwhile, as the storm impacted the country, snow hit the northern portion of the UK due to a passing cold front, but no damage was reported as of 21 October. East Sussex also saw a landslide between the rail stations of Crowborough and Uckfield. Across the Channel Islands, several trees were felled and a lifeguard house was blown by the cyclone's winds.

=== Czech Republic ===
Aurore left over 270,000 households in the country without a power supply, which further rose to 300,000 as of 21 October. This number was mainly focused at the Central Bohemian Region. Transportation services were also affected significantly, due to roadways being blocked by downed trees and railway lines. Several passengers at Prague Václav Havel Airport were also stranded due to strong winds from the storm, preventing them to board safely. The ČEZ Distribuce declared the aforementioned region, Děčín, Česká Lípa, Chrudim, Pardubice, Trutnov, Náchod and Havlíčkův Brod due to the storm's damages. Firefighters also moved and destroyed the trees in Karlovy Vary that are obstructing to roads. Loose metal sheets and even a roof of a kindergarten school were also a problem for them. All three zoos in Ústí nad Labem were also closed. Two people was injured due to a tree smashing their car. Winds of over 100 kilometres per hour (62 mph) impacted the country.

=== Poland ===
Due to Aurore, its meteorological bureau placed several areas in northwest Poland of second-degree warning on 21 October. Several trees in Zielona Góra and Gorzow were uprooted as a result of the winds the cyclone brought on the country. Greater Poland, Lower Silesia and Western Pomerania were the areas that are reportedly the most-affected areas by the storm. One person was injured in Bielsko-Biała, authorities there reported. In Baszewice, a tree impacted a train, injuring three people out of its 76 passengers. The side windows and its front part was damaged, according to authorities there. Another person was injured when another tree fell on his car; he was transferred to the hospital to treat his injuries. The highest concerns Polish authorities there reported are limited to felled trees and broken sapling branches. The roofing of a school in Stołeczna was swept away by the storm's strong winds while as of 21 October, over 9,693 calls for wind damages were already received by fire brigade authorities across the affected areas of the country. While loading a gate lifted by a crane, one person was non-fatally injured. Another was injured in Gryfino, West Pomeranian Voivodeship. Several zoos were also closed as a precaution. 4 deaths were reported due to the storm, in which two are in Lower Silesia. The other two are due to their car being crushed by a tree in Wrocław. 13 were overall injured by Aurore in the country.

=== Germany ===
The Deutsche Bahn, a railway line station in Germany announced that train services across North Rhine-Westphalia, along with three states in its central and eastern portion were canceled due to the storm. Marine and vessel warnings were also posted, accordingly. Along the country's capital, two recreational zoos were also closed. According to the meteorological service in the country, the Deutscher Wetterdienst (German Weather Service), the cyclone is seen to brought gusts up to 105 km/h (65 mph), along with heavy downpours. Many roofing of public establishments and other houses were damaged, including that of a stadium in Antwerp. Aurore also spawned a tornado in Kiel on 21 October, causing several trees to be uprooted and affect cars and public greenhouses being totally wrecked. Four individuals in Barendrecht were injured. Weather stations in Feldberg and the Black Forest both recorded winds of 166 kilometres per hour (103 mph) on 22 October, associated with Aurore. The only death from the storm in Germany was recorded on 21 October, when a train worker was killed by a falling tree branch.

=== Belgium and Netherlands ===
Many trees were uprooted and house roofs and gutters were swept away by the winds in the Netherlands. Private establishments also suffered damages due to the storm, with over €25,000 (US$23,013) damage being incurred in Plopsaland De Panne. Many calls about obstructions, on public roadways or in front of houses, were also received by authorities there. Aurore also disrupted traffic in Antwerp. On its coastal port, many intermodal containers were affected. A truck swerved over a roadway into a canal, seriously injuring its driver. Train services in the country were cancelled and several areas experienced power outages. Over 376 calls were received by fire brigades and two injuries were also counted there.

== Highest gust per country ==
Country	Highest gust	Location
France	175 km/h	Fecamp, Normandy
United Kingdom	152 km/h	Margate
Czechia	159 km/h	Karlovy Vary
Poland	163 km/h	Rusinowo
Germany	166 km/h	Feldberg
Netherlands	105 km/h	Westdorpe
Belgium	119 km/h	Tournai
Luxembourg	123 km/h	Flaxweiler
Denmark	125 km/h	Gedser Odde
Sweden	115 km/h	Skanör
Austria	145 km/h	Saalbach-Hinterglemm
Switzerland	150 km/h	Säntis
Liechtenstein	137 km/h	Ruggell
