= Skotniki, Gryfino County =

Skotniki
- Settlement
- Location within Poland
- Coordinates: 53°5′0″N 14°40′54″E
- Country: Poland
- Voivodeship: West Pomeranian
- County: Gryfino
- Gmina: Banie

Skotniki [skɔtˈniki] is a settlement in the administrative district of Gmina Banie, within Gryfino County, West Pomeranian Voivodeship, in north-western Poland. It lies approximately 3 km (2 mi) south-east of Banie, 23 km (14 mi) south-east of Gryfino, and 38 km (24 mi) south of the regional capital Szczecin.

For the history of the region, see History of Pomerania.
