= Babinek =

Babinek refers to the following places in Poland:

- Babinek, Gryfino County
- Babinek, Pyrzyce County
