= Gogolice, Gryfino County =

Gogolice
- Village
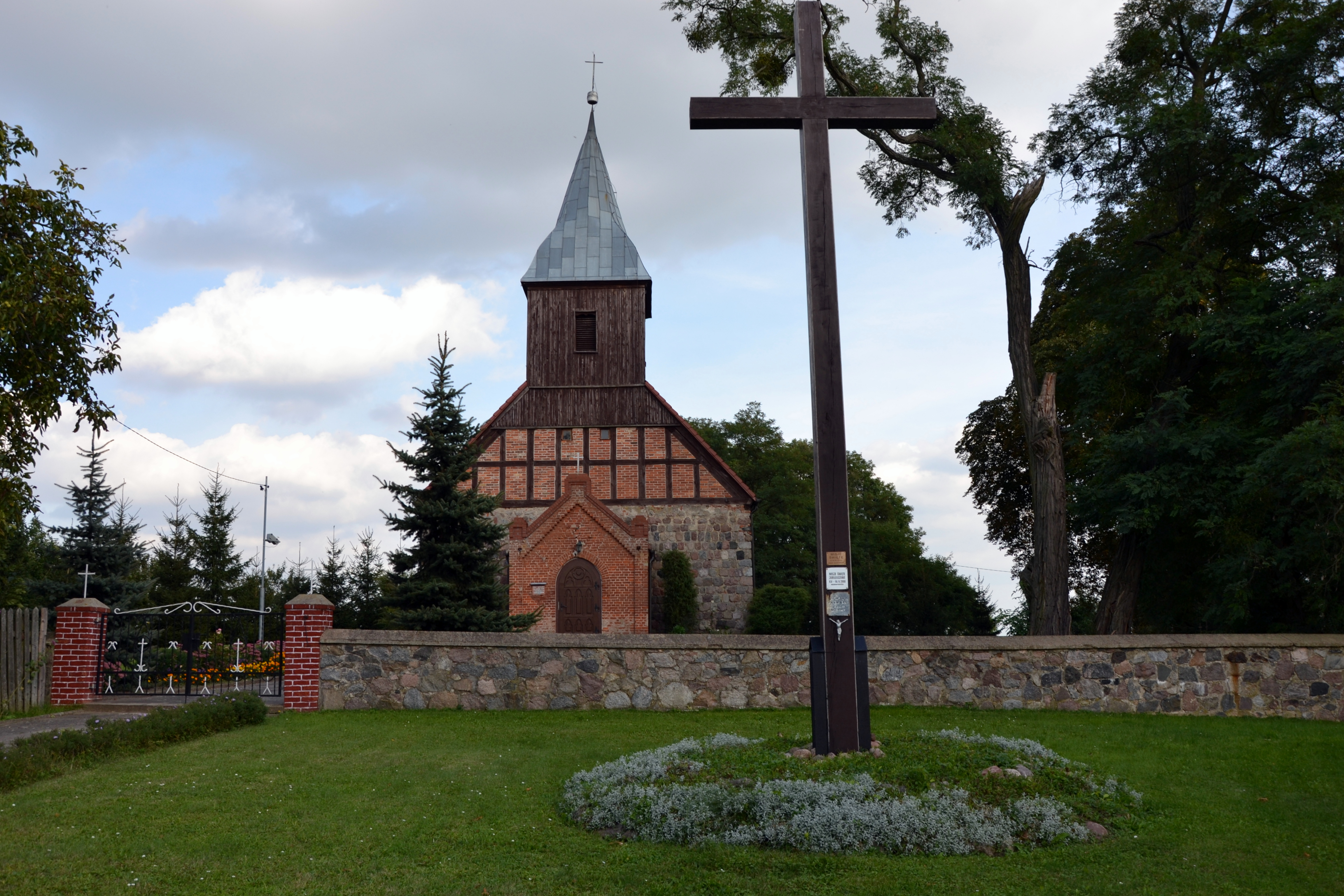

- Location within Poland
- Coordinates: 52°54′44″N 14°35′42″E
- Country: Poland
- Voivodeship: West Pomeranian
- County: Gryfino
- Gmina: Trzcińsko-Zdrój

Gogolice [ɡɔɡɔˈlit͡sɛ] is a village in the administrative district of Gmina Trzcińsko-Zdrój, within Gryfino County, West Pomeranian Voivodeship, in north-western Poland. It lies approximately 7 km (4 mi) south of Trzcińsko-Zdrój, 39 km (24 mi) south of Gryfino, and 56 km (35 mi) south of the regional capital Szczecin.

For the history of the region, see History of Pomerania.
