= Gmina Trzcińsko-Zdrój =

Gmina Trzcińsko-Zdrój Trzcińsko-Zdrój Commune
- Gmina
- Coat of arms

- Location within Poland
- Coordinates (Trzcińsko-Zdrój): 52°58′N 14°37′E
- Country: Poland
- Voivodeship: West Pomeranian
- County: Gryfino
- Seat: Trzcińsko-Zdrój

Area
  - Total: 170.51 km^{2} (65.83 sq mi)

Population (2006)
  - Total: 5,690
  - Density: 33.4/km^{2} (86.4/sq mi)
  - Urban: 2,496
  - Rural: 3,194
- Website: http://www.trzcinsko-zdroj.pl/

Gmina Trzcińsko-Zdrój is an urban-rural gmina (administrative district) in Gryfino County, West Pomeranian Voivodeship, in north-western Poland. Its seat is the town of Trzcińsko-Zdrój, which lies approximately 33 kilometres (21 mi) south of Gryfino and 50 km (31 mi) south of the regional capital Szczecin.

The gmina covers an area of 170.51 square kilometres (65.8 sq mi), and as of 2006 its total population is 5,690 (out of which the population of Trzcińsko-Zdrój amounts to 2,496, and the population of the rural part of the gmina is 3,194).

The gmina contains part of the protected area called Cedynia Landscape Park.

== Villages ==
Apart from the town of Trzcińsko-Zdrój, Gmina Trzcińsko-Zdrój contains the villages and settlements of Antoniewice, Babin, Chełm Dolny, Chełm Górny, Cieplikowo, Czyste, Dobropole, Drzesz, Gogolice, Góralice, Górczyn, Klasztorne, Ostrzewka, Piaseczno, Rosnówko, Rosnowo, Smuga, Stołeczna, Strzeszów, Tchórzno and Wesoła.

== Neighbouring gminas ==
Gmina Trzcińsko-Zdrój is bordered by the gminas of Banie, Chojna, Dębno, Mieszkowice and Myślibórz.
