= Lubanowo =

- Village
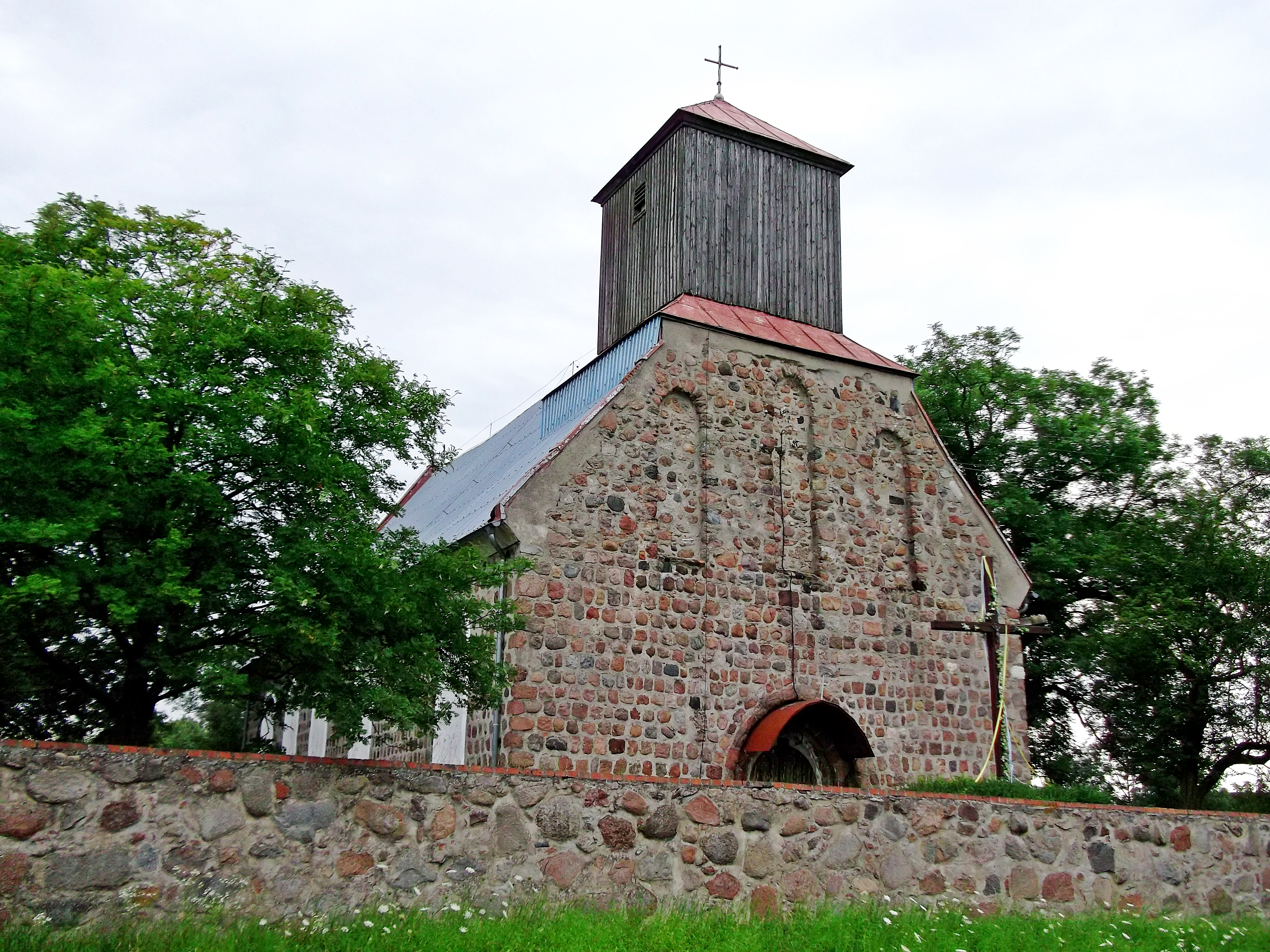
- Church of Christ the King

- Location within Poland
- Coordinates: 53°7′46″N 14°36′44″E
- Country: Poland
- Voivodeship: West Pomeranian
- County: Gryfino
- Gmina: Banie

Population (approx.)
  - Total: 990

Lubanowo [lubaˈnɔvɔ] (formerly German: Liebenow) is a village in the administrative district of Gmina Banie, within Gryfino County, West Pomeranian Voivodeship, in north-western Poland. It lies approximately 5 km (3 mi) north-west of Banie, 16 km (10 mi) south-east of Gryfino, and 32 km (20 mi) south of the regional capital Szczecin.

For the history of the region, see History of Pomerania.

The village has an approximate population of 990.
