= Góralice =

- Village
- Location within Poland
- Coordinates: 52°58′24″N 14°40′15″E
- Country: Poland
- Voivodeship: West Pomeranian
- County: Gryfino
- Gmina: Trzcińsko-Zdrój
- Population: 540
- Website: http://www.goralice.prezentacje.org

Góralice [ɡuraˈlit͡sɛ] is a village in the administrative district of Gmina Trzcińsko-Zdrój, within Gryfino County, West Pomeranian Voivodeship, in north-western Poland. It lies approximately 4 km (2 mi) east of Trzcińsko-Zdrój, 34 km (21 mi) south of Gryfino, and 50 km (31 mi) south of the regional capital Szczecin.

For the history of the region, see History of Pomerania.

The village has a population of 540.
