= Rosnowo, Gryfino County =

Rosnowo
- Village
- Location within Poland
- Coordinates: 52°57′5″N 14°32′56″E
- Country: Poland
- Voivodeship: West Pomeranian
- County: Gryfino
- Gmina: Trzcińsko-Zdrój

Rosnowo [rɔsˈnɔvɔ] (German Rohrbeck) is a village in the administrative district of Gmina Trzcińsko-Zdrój, within Gryfino County, West Pomeranian Voivodeship, in north-western Poland. It lies approximately 5 km (3 mi) west of Trzcińsko-Zdrój, 34 km (21 mi) south of Gryfino, and 52 km (32 mi) south of the regional capital Szczecin.

For the history of the region, see History of Pomerania.
