= Chełm Górny =

- Village
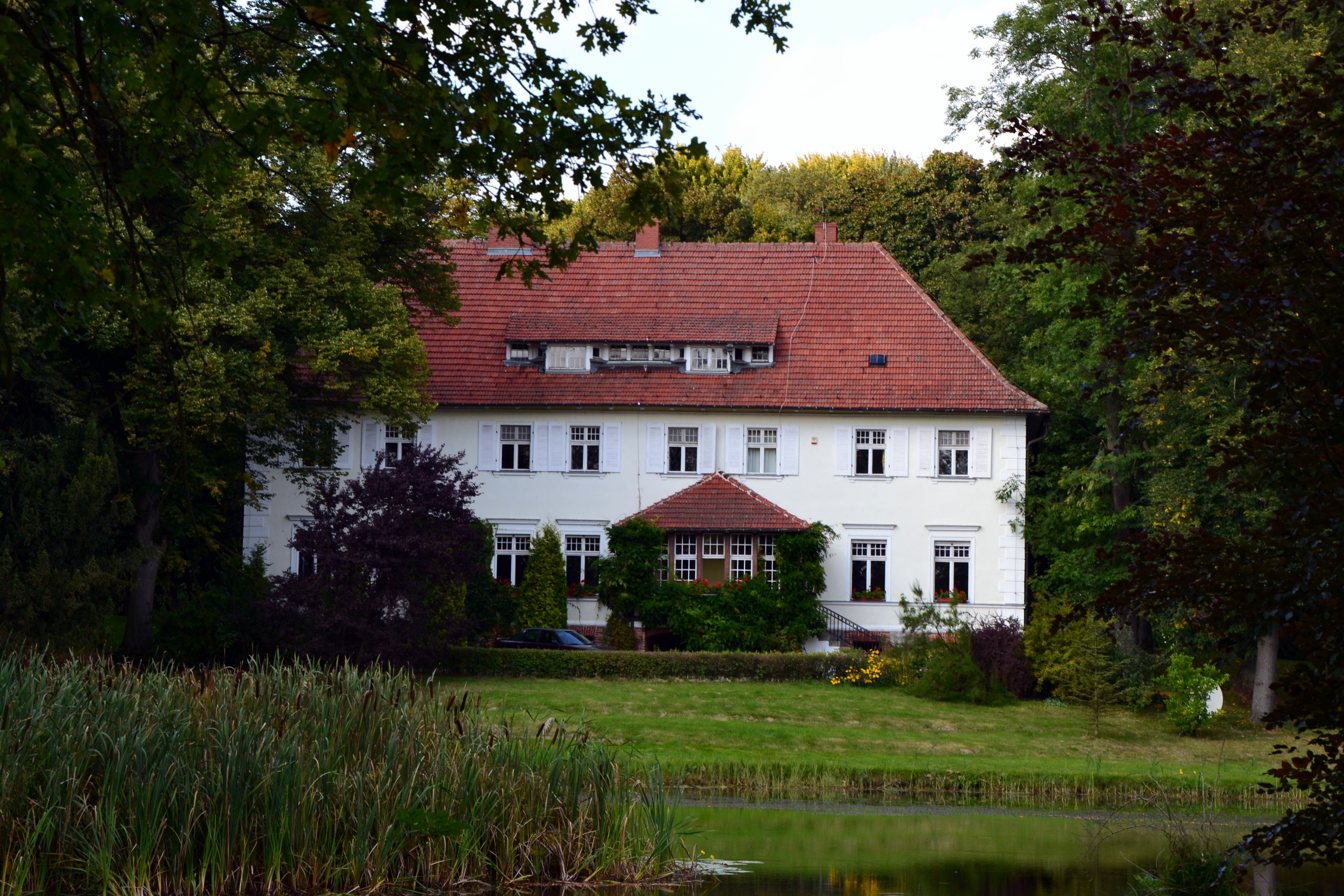
- Manor in Chełm Górny

- Coat of arms

- Location within Poland
- Coordinates: 52°52′50″N 14°35′19″E
- Country: Poland
- Voivodeship: West Pomeranian
- County: Gryfino
- Gmina: Trzcińsko-Zdrój

Chełm Górny (Polish pronunciation: [xɛwm ˈɡurnɨ]) is a village in the administrative district of Gmina Trzcińsko-Zdrój, within Gryfino County, West Pomeranian Voivodeship, in north-western Poland.

For the history of the region, see History of Pomerania.
