= Parnica, Gryfino County =

Parnica
- Village
- Location within Poland
- Coordinates: 53°7′35″N 14°42′2″E
- Country: Poland
- Voivodeship: West Pomeranian
- County: Gryfino
- Gmina: Banie
- Website: http://www.banie.pl

Parnica [parˈnit͡sa] (formerly German Rohrsdorf) is a village in the administrative district of Gmina Banie, within Gryfino County, West Pomeranian Voivodeship, in north-western Poland. It lies approximately 4 km (2 mi) north-east of Banie, 20 km (12 mi) south-east of Gryfino, and 34 km (21 mi) south of the regional capital Szczecin.

For the history of the region, see History of Pomerania.
