= Export House =

Coordinates: 51°19′20.76″N 0°34′14.17″W

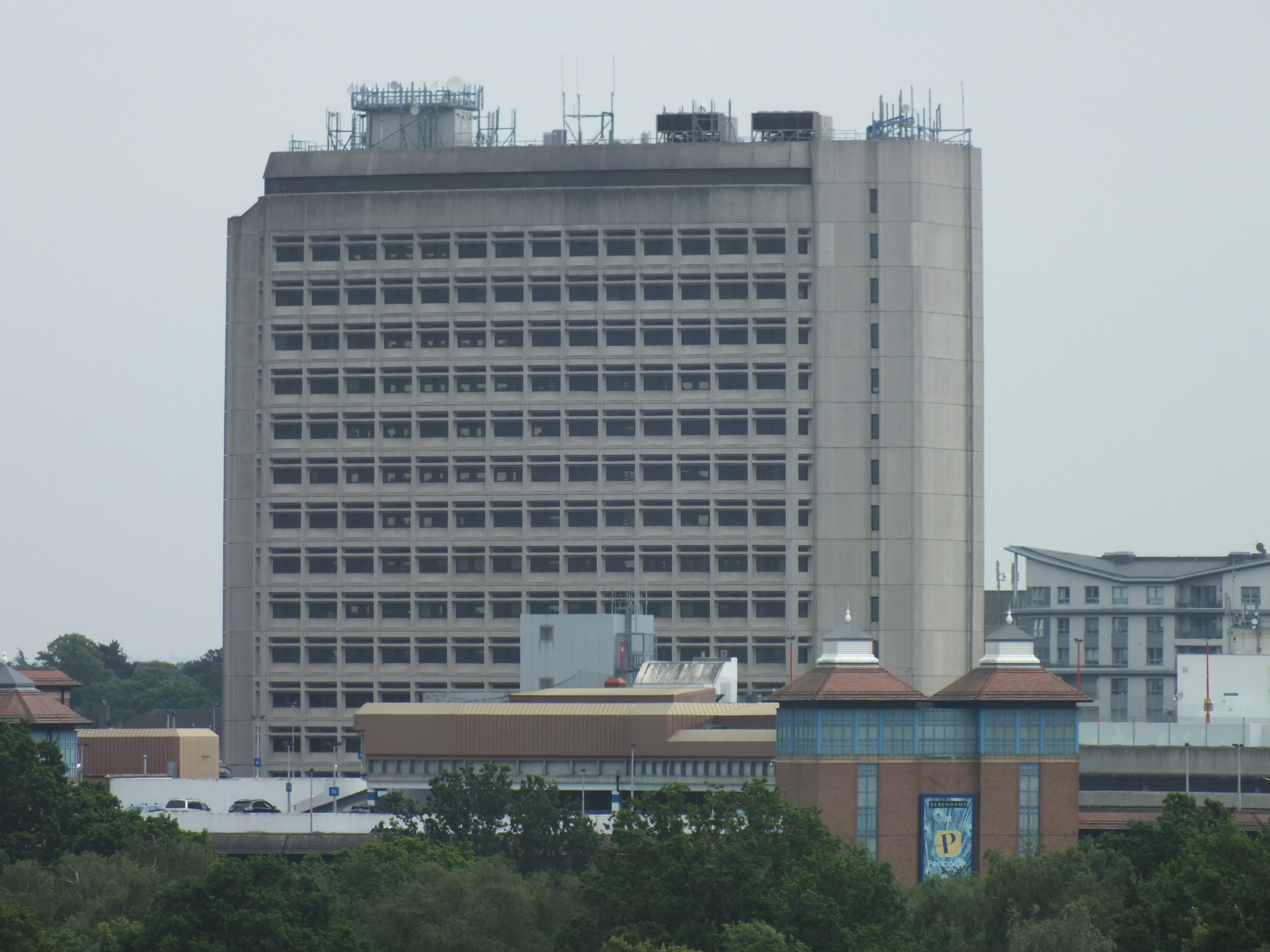
- Export House in 2011

- Location within Surrey

Record height
- Tallest in Woking from January 1974 to September 2019^{[I]}
- Surpassed by: Victoria Square

General information
- Status: Completed
- Type: Office
- Location: Woking, Surrey, UK
- Completed: 1974

Height
- Roof: 73 metres (240 ft)

Technical details
- Floor count: 15 at ground level or above
- Lifts/elevators: 4

Export House in Woking, Surrey, is a tall office building formerly also known as the BAT Building during its tenancy by British American Tobacco. It was the tallest in Woking and among the five tallest buildings in Surrey until the construction of Victoria Square in September 2019. Its height is 73 metres (240 ft) spread over its 18 floors (15 above ground).

== History ==
Export House was the significantly tallest aspect of the Surrey town regeneration after World War II, which centred on the expansion and improvement of satellite towns, in this county being Guildford and Woking. It was built at the same time as the Wolsey Place Shopping Centre, which is a contiguous building. Export House was the tallest building in the borough of Woking. Construction of Export House finished in 1974. It became tenant-ready in 1976 when it was part-let to the first lessee, BAT who then expanded across the remaining floors.

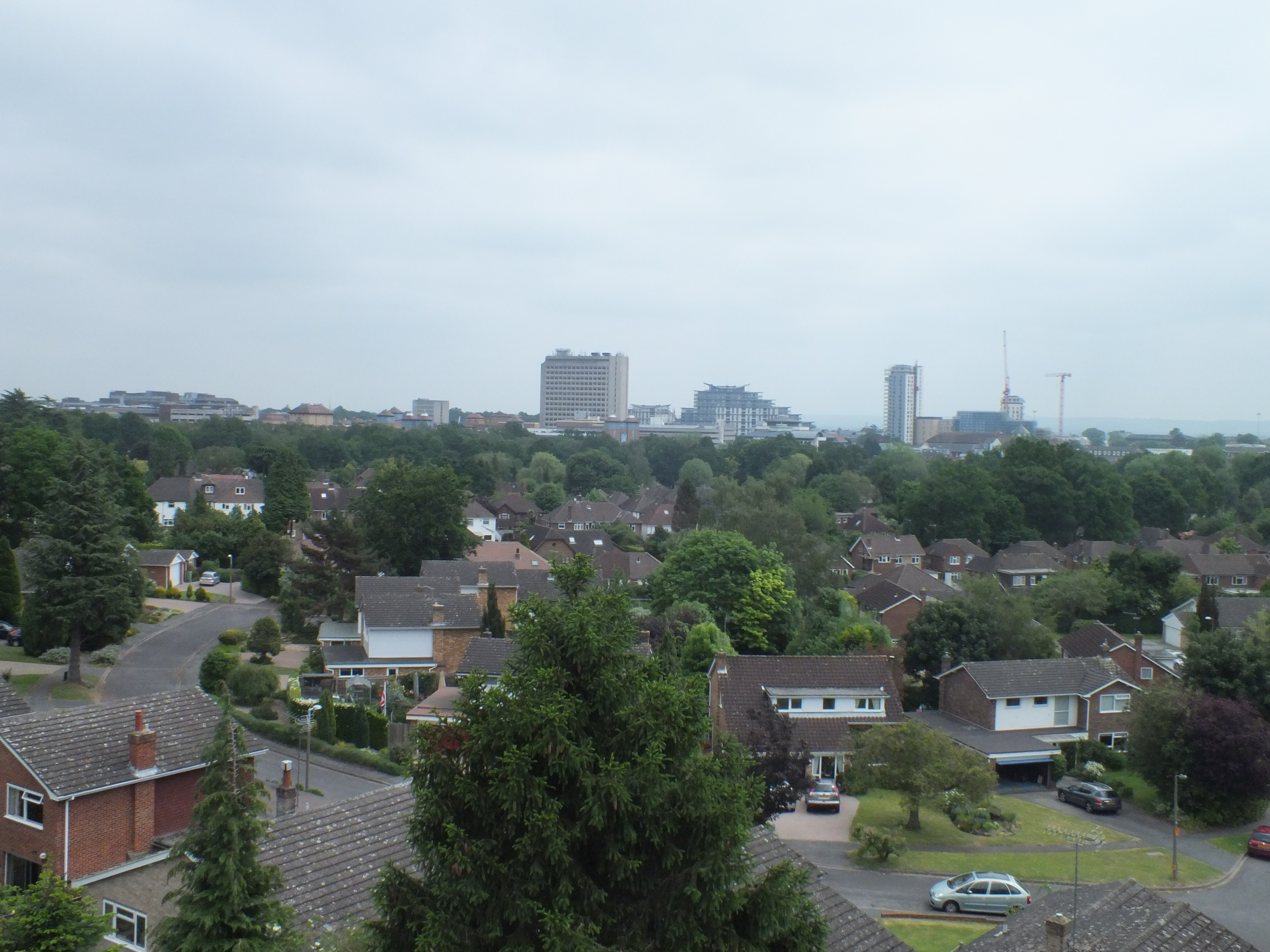
Export House within Woking's skyline, 2011

=== Tenants and lessees ===
In 1976, British American Tobacco moved in as the first tenant, making it their headquarters. Export House had already been completed two years previously in 1974. In 1997 BAT chose to relocate to a new building in London. Accordingly it was for some time also known as the BAT Building. It was formerly the tallest building in Woking and among the five tallest buildings in the county. Its height is 73 metres (240 ft) and has 18 storeys (15 floors above ground).

Telewest moved into Export House during summer 2001 after a £15 million refurbishment. Telewest had rented the top six floors for about a year before they moved permanently to Export House. Their previous base was in Sheerwater also by the South West Main Line in the borough. Telewest vacated in 2006 after a merger and consolidation with NTL. From a deal of 2008 Mustang Engineering began to occupy for a few years and in the 2010s were succeeded by Mouchel Group who moved from West Hall in nearby West Byfleet.

=== Future ===
The block has set a precedent for iconic, complimentary buildings being open to consideration under the existing Woking Borough Local Plan, adopted in 1999. Plans for a new shopping centre, named Victoria Square, located next to Export House, were unveiled in 2012 with planning permission approved in 2014. Victoria Square includes three new towers, two residential and one a hotel, at 34, 32 and 23 stories tall respectively. All three new towers would be taller than Export House, becoming the new tallest buildings in Surrey. Construction began in 2016, and is scheduled for completion by 2021.

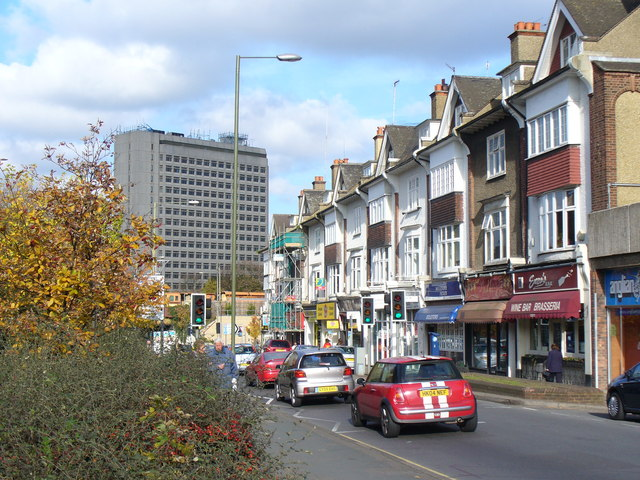
A semi-cross section view of Export House in 2007, taken from Guildford Road near Woking railway station

== Architecture ==
Export House is of modular design, chamfered on the narrow west façade/parapet and lightly storey-grooved. It avoided the tri-dimensional symmetry of some of its shorter-lived contemporaries. Export House has no explicit or implicit reference to compulsory or encouraged complete demolition in the mid-term local plan. From 2000 to 2007 the structure bore an air pollution-stained upper exterior so appeared more brutalist than old and new buildings of the town centre. The 1950s to 1980s saw commercial office mid-cost construction sceptical of fancy classical architecture while remaining polite, incorporating subtle asymmetry such as with stylised ends, roofs or windows in a maximal façade: as in London's Guy's Hospital and the Royal Festival Hall. In Surrey, comparable buildings are the Chubb Tower and within 500m of border of Ewell, Surrey, the Tolworth Tower in Greater London. Export House has a staircase and four lifts adjacent to the main entrance in the western facade. The building has radio and telecom masts appropriate for its height and deep parapet roof.

== Location ==
The building is part-above Wolsey Place Shopping Centre, its entrance being next to one of the latter's main entrance. Beneath the shopping centre is a private, gated car park underneath; opposite is a multi-storey car park. Occupying part of a commercial block of the entirely commercial-leisure town centre it is classed as on Cawsey Way.

Export House, New Central and Centrium in central Woking's skyline are clearly visible from the Hog's Back, the narrow western ridge of the North Downs 7 miles (11 km) south, the closest point of these downs is the west bank of the Wey, Guildford and Pewley Down which commands the east bank, including Guildford Castle.

=== Public access ===
The building has occasionally been open to the public on tours for Heritage Open Days. Tours last for approximately 30 minutes.

== Gallery ==
The first two pictures were taken during December 2011. A large Christmas tree configuration of lights formed part of Woking's Christmas celebrations.

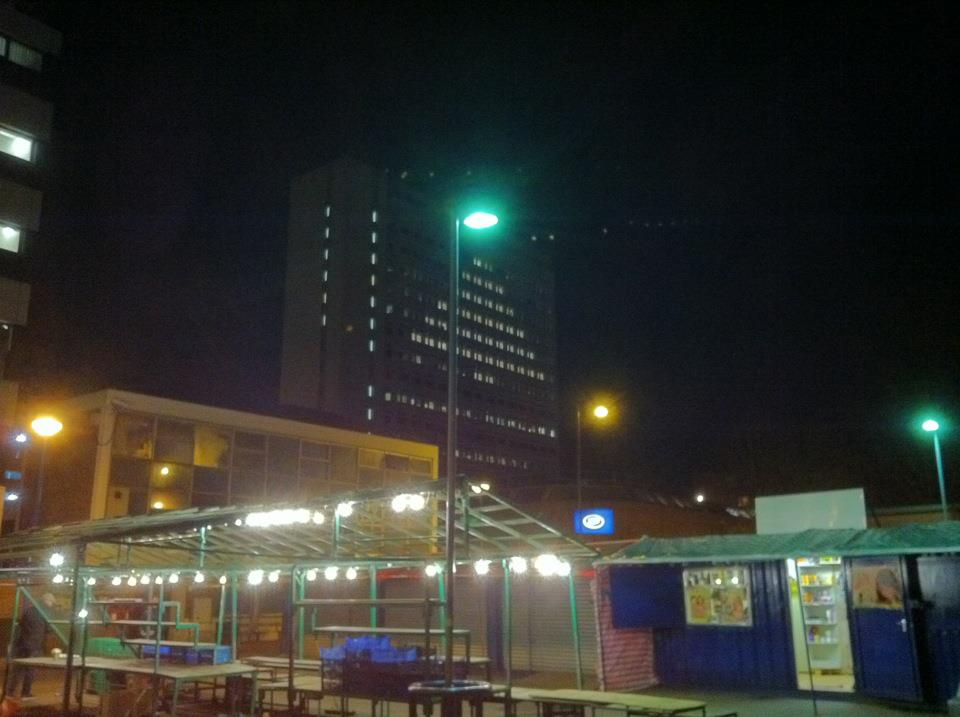
Woking Export House Christmas tree with star from market

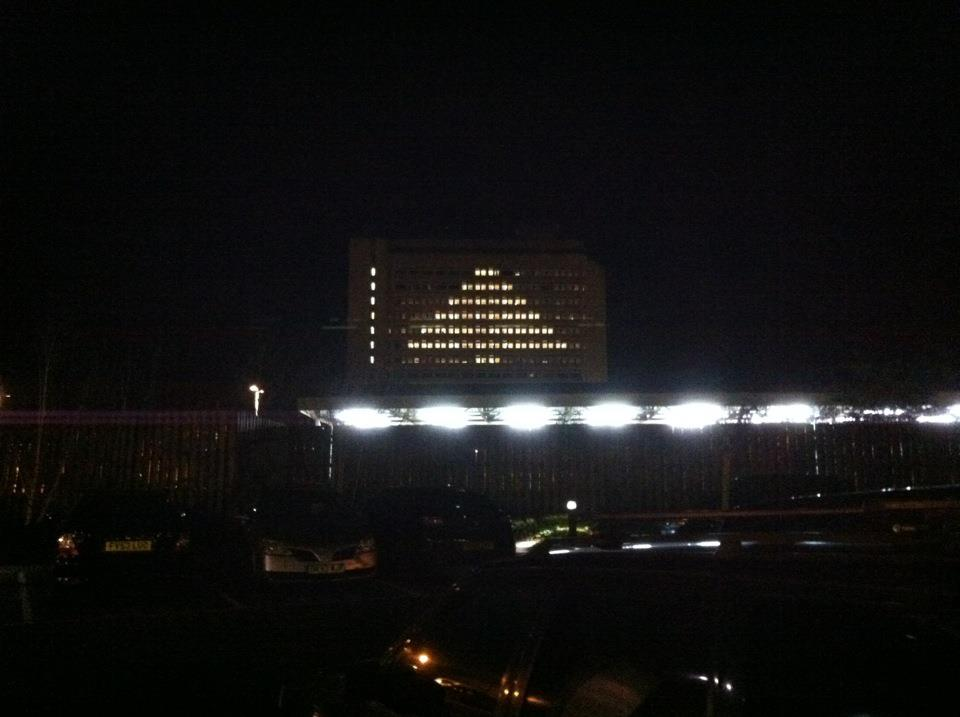
Woking Export House Christmas tree from train station
