= Klasztorne, Gryfino County =

Klasztorne
- Village
- Location within Poland
- Coordinates: 52°56′36″N 14°37′35″E
- Country: Poland
- Voivodeship: West Pomeranian
- County: Gryfino
- Gmina: Trzcińsko-Zdrój

Government
  - Sołtys: Aleksandra Skiba
- Area: 313 ha (770 acres)
- Population (2024): 104

Klasztorne [klaʂˈtɔrnɛ] (German: Steineck) is a village in the Gmina Trzcińsko-Zdrój, within Gryfino County, West Pomeranian Voivodeship, in north-western Poland.

== Geography ==
The village lies on a lake of the same name – Jezioro Klasztorne (lit. Lake Klasztorne). It lies approximately 3 km (2 mi) south of the municipal centre in Trzcińsko-Zdrój, 36 km (22 mi) south of the powiat capital Gryfino, and 53 km (33 mi) south of the regional capital Szczecin.

Klasztorne is a sołectwo within the Gmina Trzcińsko-Zdrój with an area of 313 ha (773 acres) or 3 km^{2} (1 sq mi).

== History ==
Klasztorne, known at the time by its German name Steineck, has historically been an estate (Gut) under the jurisdiction of Schönfließ (now Trzcińsko-Zdrój). At the turn of the 20th century, the estate, which included a distillery, was owned by Johannes Kühn and encompassed an area of 540 ha (1,334 acres) or 5 km^{2} (2 sq mi). The estate's manor house, which was destroyed during World War II, was located in the western part of the settlement, adjacent to a triangular manor park.

After the flight and expulsion of Germans from the area as a consequence of World War II, the settlement was given its modern Polish name of Klasztorne. Between 1975 and 1998, Klasztorne was part of the Gorzów Voivodeship.

In the 21st century, Klasztorne is an agricultural settlement primarily composed of privately owned farms. While the original layout of the settlement has been partially erased, many historic buildings from the 19th century, primarily constructed of stone and brick, persist. Some of the historic farm buildings where repurposed as residential spaces. In 2025, the village had a harvest festival.

== Demographics ==
As of the 2021 Polish census, Klasztorne has a population of 99 divided into 53 (53.5%) males and 46 (46.5%) females. According to the website of the Gmina Trzcińsko-Zdrój, Klasztorne's population was 104 in 2024, an increase of 5.1% since the census.

Historical population

| Year | Pop. | ±% |
|---|---|---|
| 1805 | 51 | — |
| 2008 | 116 | +127.5% |
| 2012 | 115 | −0.9% |

| Year | Pop. | ±% |
|---|---|---|
| 2021 | 99 | −13.9% |
| 2023 | 108 | +9.1% |
| 2024 | 104 | −3.7% |

Data may be affected by territorial fluctuation.
Sources: 1895, 2008, 2012 & 2021, 2023, 2024

== Politics ==
As of 2024, the sołtys (village head) of Klasztorne is Aleksandra Skiba, who was elected on 11 June 2024, succeeding Józef Kozakiewicz who was in office since at least 2021. As a sołectwo within the Gmina Trzcińsko-Zdrój, Klasztorne also has a village council (Polish: Rada Sołectwa) which, as of 2024, consists of the following four members:

1. Daniel Kozakiewicz
2. Aleksandra Saskowska
3. Marcin Winnik
4. Małgorzata Ziółkowska
