= Trzaski, Gryfino County =

Trzaski
- Settlement
- Location within Poland
- Coordinates: 53°8′17″N 14°36′59″E
- Country: Poland
- Voivodeship: West Pomeranian
- County: Gryfino
- Gmina: Banie

Trzaski [ˈtʂaski] is a settlement in the administrative district of Gmina Banie, within Gryfino County, West Pomeranian Voivodeship, in north-western Poland. It lies approximately 6 km (4 mi) north-west of Banie, 16 km (10 mi) south-east of Gryfino, and 31 km (19 mi) south of the regional capital Szczecin.

For the history of the region, see History of Pomerania.
