= Stołeczna =

- Village
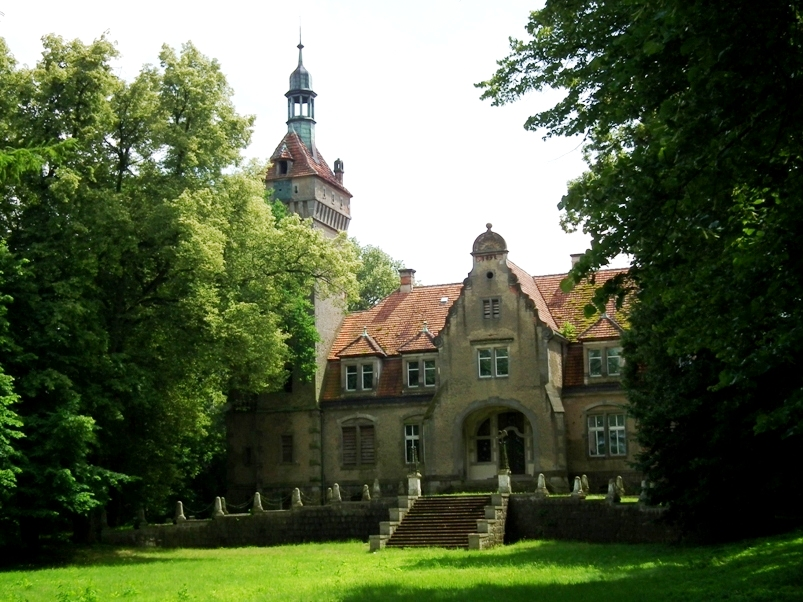
- Old manor house in Stołeczna

- Location within Poland
- Coordinates: 52°55′54″N 14°39′34″E
- Country: Poland
- Voivodeship: West Pomeranian
- County: Gryfino
- Gmina: Trzcińsko-Zdrój
- Time zone: UTC+1 (CET)
  - Summer (DST): UTC+2 (CEST)
- Vehicle registration: ZGR

Stołeczna [stɔˈwɛt͡ʂna] (German: Stolzenfelde) is a village in the administrative district of Gmina Trzcińsko-Zdrój, within Gryfino County, West Pomeranian Voivodeship, in north-western Poland. It lies approximately 5 km (3 mi) south-east of Trzcińsko-Zdrój, 38 km (24 mi) south of Gryfino, and 55 km (34 mi) south of the regional capital Szczecin.
