= Swobnica =

- Village
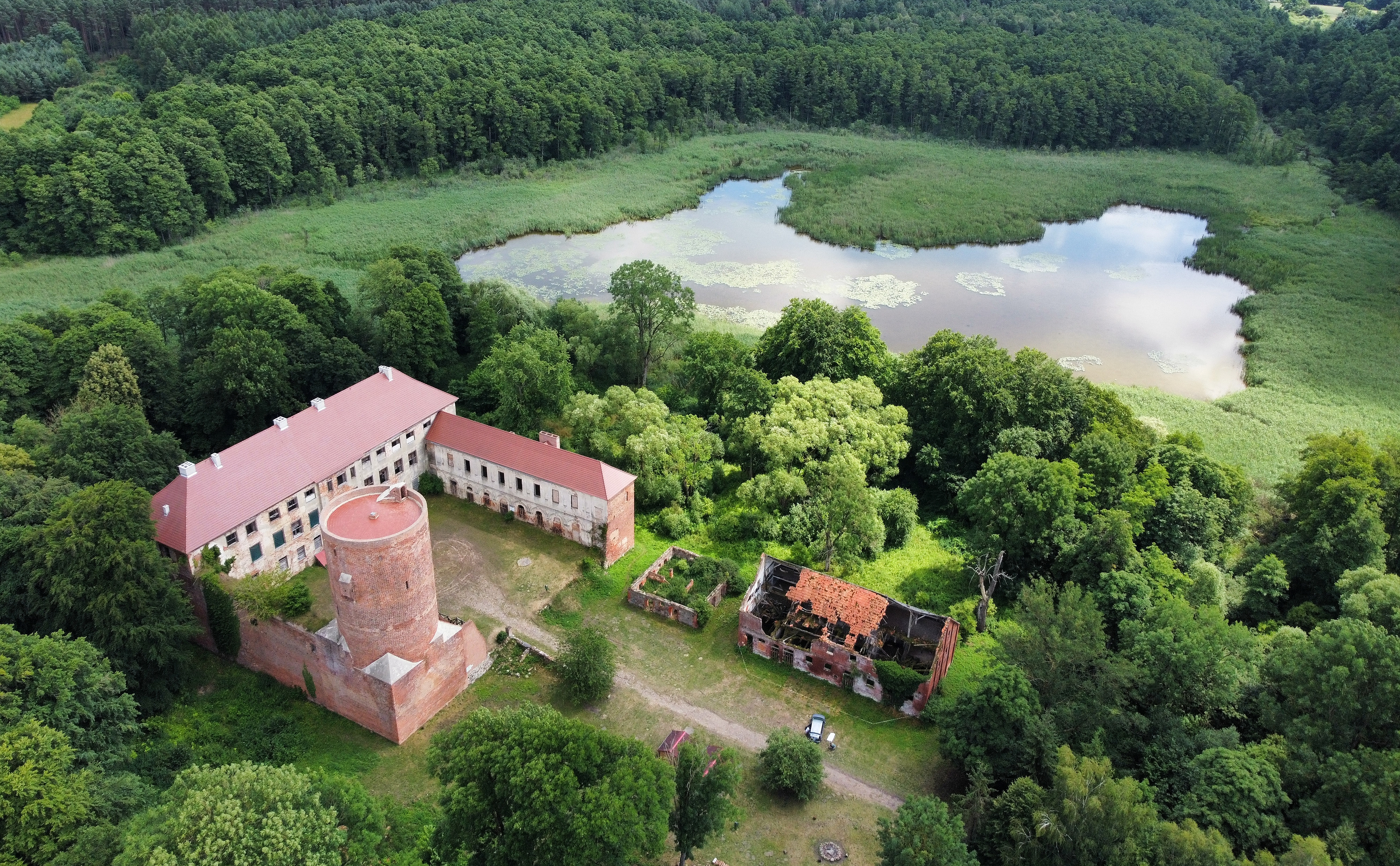
- Castle ruins

- Location within Poland
- Coordinates: 53°2′N 14°37′E
- Country: Poland
- Voivodeship: West Pomeranian
- County: Gryfino
- Gmina: Banie
- Population (approx.): 700

Swobnica [sfɔbˈnit͡sa] (formerly German: Wildenbruch in Pommern) is a village in the administrative district of Gmina Banie, within Gryfino County, West Pomeranian Voivodeship, in north-western Poland. It lies approximately 9 km (6 mi) south-west of Banie, 26 km (16 mi) south of Gryfino, and 43 km (27 mi) south of the regional capital Szczecin.

The village has an approximate population of 700.

== History ==
First mentioned in a 1345 deed, the settlement became the seat of a commandry of the Knights Hospitaller, expelled from nearby Rörchen (Rurka) in 1377, on the invitation of the Pomeranian dukes. After the protestant Reformation, the Wildenbruch estates were held by the noble House of Putbus. Upon the Thirty Years' War and the 1648 Peace of Westphalia, the area became part of Swedish Pomerania.

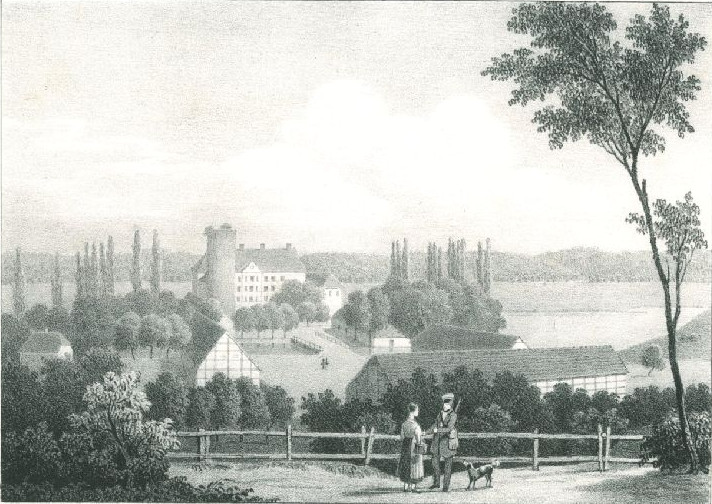
Wildenbruch Castle, 1846 lithograph

The secularised commandry was ceded to the Hohenzollern electorate of Brandenburg by the 1679 Peace of Saint-Germain. Wildenbruch was purchased by Princess Sophia Dorothea of Schleswig-Holstein-Sonderburg-Glücksburg (1636–1689), the second wife of the "Great Elector" Frederick William, who united it with her Brandenburg estates of Schwedt and Vierraden to provide for her descendants of the Brandenburg-Schwedt secundogeniture. She had the Wildenbruch fortress rebuilt in a Baroque style.

Wildenbruch was bequested to Dorothea's first-born son Margrave Philip William (1669–1711) and her grandson Frederick William (1700–1771), who died at the castle. The last of the Brandenburg-Schwedt owners was his younger brother Frederick Henry (1709–1788), Wildenbruch fell back to the royal Hohenzollern main line.

The last Schwedt heiress Elisabeth Louise (1739–1820) had married her uncle Prince Augustus Ferdinand of Prussia in 1755; their son Prince Louis Ferdinand gave the title of von Wildenbruch to his illegitimate son Ludwig. Confirmed by King Frederick William III in 1810, the title was bequested to Ludwig's son, the author Ernst von Wildenbruch and his descendants.

Wildenbruch was incorporated into the Prussian Province of Pomerania. After World War II, the area passed to the Republic of Poland and the remaining German population was expelled (see History of Pomerania). Though declared a national monument, the former Hohenzollern castle decayed. Recently, some efforts were made towards its preservation.

== Notable people ==
- Waldemar Krzystek (born 1953) a Polish film director and screenwriter
