= Victoria Square, Woking =

Residential skyscraper complex in Woking, England

Victoria Square
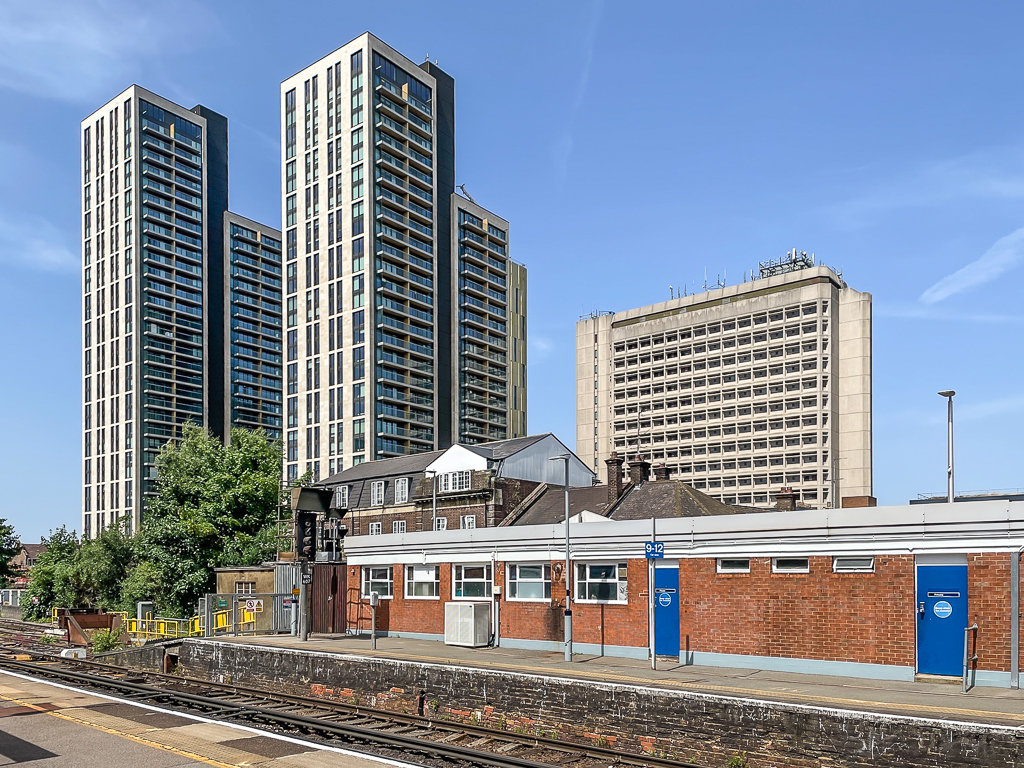
- Victoria Square Tower 1 and 2 (left) and Export House (right) in 2022
- Interactive map of the Victoria Square area

Record height
- Tallest in Woking since September 2019^{[I]}
- Preceded by: Export House

General information
- Status: Completed
- Type: Residential; Hotel; Retail
- Location: A320 Victoria Way, Woking, England
- Coordinates: 51.318343°N 0.560911°W
- Construction started: June 2017
- Completed: August 2022
- Cost: £700 million

Height
- Roof: 117 m (384 ft)

Technical details
- Floor count: 34

Design and construction
- Architect: Benoy
- Developer: Woking Borough Council; Moyallen Group
- Main contractor: Sir Robert McAlpine

Victoria Square is a residential skyscraper complex and wider town centre redevelopment project in Woking, Surrey, England. Upon topping out in September 2019, Tower 1 of the complex became the tallest building in Woking, overtaking Export House. Construction commenced in June 2017 and, following delays related to the COVID-19 pandemic, completed in August 2022. The total construction cost of the project was £700 million.

== Construction ==
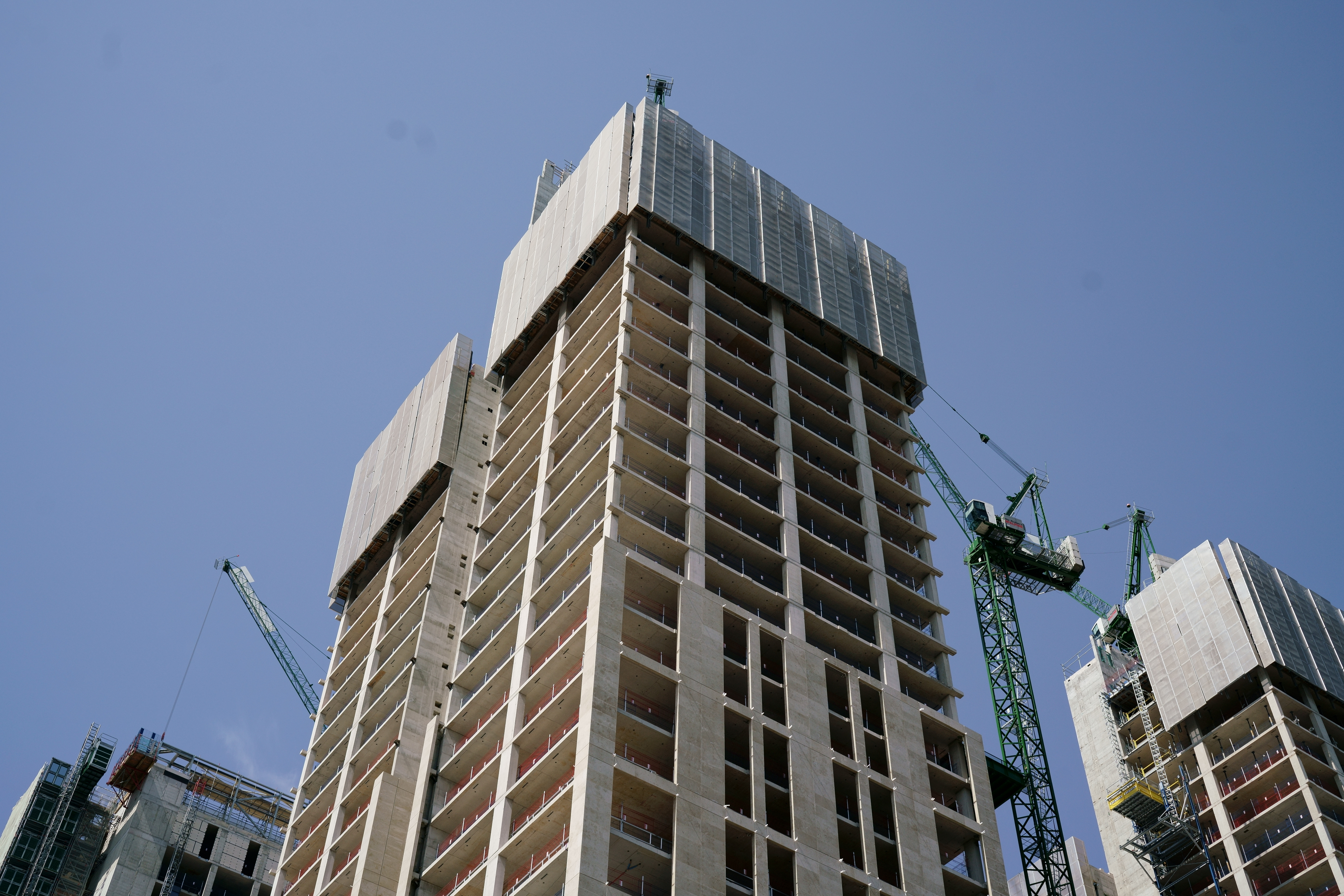
Construction during 2019

Victoria Square was constructed on the site of a seven-storey office building known as Circle 7, on a site bounded by Victoria Way to the west, the railway line leading to Woking railway station to the south, and Woking town centre to the east and north. Three towers were constructed as part of the development. The tallest two skyscrapers, Tower 1 and Tower 2, are both residential in nature and consist of 34 and 32 storeys, rising to a height of 117 m (384 ft) and 105 m (344 ft) respectively. The third building, Tower 3, contains a Hilton Hotel rising to 23 storeys and a height of 94 m (308 ft). The two buildings taller than 100 m (330 ft) make Woking the smallest settlement in the United Kingdom to have a skyscraper. (Note: Under the Emporis Standards Committee, a skyscraper is defined as a multi-storey building which is at least 100 m (330 ft) tall. Any building from 35 to 100 m (115 to 328 ft) tall is generally considered to be a high-rise building.)

Additional construction as part of the Victoria Square development included a plant-covered multistorey car park containing the tallest spiral ramps in the United Kingdom, a ground-level shopping centre extension named Victoria Place (formerly The Peacocks) linked to the nearby High Street, a flagship Marks & Spencer food hall on the ground floor of Tower 1, new bus stops at the western end of the High Street Link Road, and public spaces including a square.

== History ==
During Storm Aurore on 20 October 2021, three cladding panels from the under construction Hilton Hotel blew away from the façade of the building and fell to the street; there were no injuries. Victoria Way was closed as a precaution until February 2022 while more than 2,000 cladding panels on the hotel received additional reinforcement, further delaying construction of Victoria Square.
