= Strzeszów, West Pomeranian Voivodeship =

Strzeszów
- Village
- Location within Poland
- Coordinates: 52°59′10″N 14°36′26″E
- Country: Poland
- Voivodeship: West Pomeranian
- County: Gryfino
- Gmina: Trzcińsko-Zdrój
- Population: 220

Strzeszów [ˈstʂɛʂuf] (German Stresow) is a village in the administrative district of Gmina Trzcińsko-Zdrój, within Gryfino County, West Pomeranian Voivodeship, in north-western Poland. It lies approximately 3 km (2 mi) north of Trzcińsko-Zdrój, 31 km (19 mi) south of Gryfino, and 48 km (30 mi) south of the regional capital Szczecin.

The village has a population of 220.
