= Babinek, Gryfino County =

Babinek
- Village
- Location within Poland
- Coordinates: 53°8′N 14°32′E
- Country: Poland
- Voivodeship: West Pomeranian
- County: Gryfino
- Gmina: Banie

Babinek [baˈbinɛk] (German Heinrichsdorf) is a village in the administrative district of Gmina Banie, within Gryfino County, West Pomeranian Voivodeship, in north-western Poland. It lies approximately 10 km (6 mi) west of Banie, 14 km (9 mi) south of Gryfino, and 32 km (20 mi) south of the regional capital Szczecin.

The settlement's German name indicates that the village was founded in the Middle Ages by German settlers.

== History ==
The settlement's German name indicates that the village was founded in the Middle Ages by German settlers.
