= Babin, Gryfino County =

Babin
- Village
- Location within Poland
- Coordinates: 52°53′1″N 14°38′57″E
- Country: Poland
- Voivodeship: West Pomeranian
- County: Gryfino
- Gmina: Trzcińsko-Zdrój

Babin [ˈbabin] (German: Gut Babin) is a village in the administrative district of Gmina Trzcińsko-Zdrój, within Gryfino County, West Pomeranian Voivodeship, in north-western Poland.

For the history of the region, see History of Pomerania.
