= Ostrzewka =

- Village
- Location within Poland
- Coordinates: 52°57′43″N 14°35′27″E
- Country: Poland
- Voivodeship: West Pomeranian
- County: Gryfino
- Gmina: Trzcińsko-Zdrój

Ostrzewka [ɔsˈtʂɛfka] is a village in the administrative district of Gmina Trzcińsko-Zdrój, within Gryfino County, West Pomeranian Voivodeship, in north-western Poland.

For the history of the region, see History of Pomerania.
