= Rosnówko, West Pomeranian Voivodeship =

Rosnówko
- Village
- Location within Poland
- Coordinates: 52°56′14″N 14°33′18″E
- Country: Poland
- Voivodeship: West Pomeranian
- County: Gryfino
- Gmina: Trzcińsko-Zdrój

Rosnówko [rɔsˈnufkɔ] is a village in the administrative district of Gmina Trzcińsko-Zdrój, within Gryfino County, West Pomeranian Voivodeship, in north-western Poland.

For the history of the region, see History of Pomerania.
