= Victoria Place =

Shopping centre in Woking, Surrey, England

Coordinates: 51.3195°N 0.5597°W

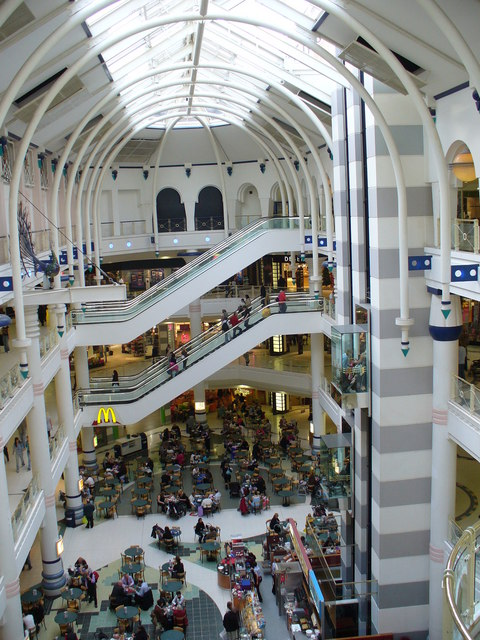
Interior of Victoria Place

Victoria Place (formerly known as The Peacocks) is a multi-storey shopping and leisure centre in Woking, Surrey, England. Construction of the centre was completed in 1992, providing approximately 90 consumer service/retail units; nine varieties of daytime restaurants, fast food shops and cafés and a link to the area's largest theatre and cinema with entrances outside and within the centre itself. A further extension was constructed in the late 2010s as part of the adjacent Victoria Square development.

== History ==
The 500,000 square feet (46,000 m^{2}) centre as Victoria Place formerly Woking Shopping was opened in April 1992 and contained a department store, a 1,200-seat theatre, three cinemas, a nightclub and a library. A£1.5 million extension was added in 2010 that included a new entrance facing Town Square. Developed by the London and Edinburgh Trust including a partnership with Woking Borough Council, it was designed by Chapman Taylor Partners. It was then owned by British Land until 2008 when it was sold to a private investor for £116 million.
