= Gmina Banie =

Gmina Banie Banie Commune
- Gmina
- Flag Coat of arms

- Location within Poland
- Coordinates (Banie): 53°6′3″N 14°40′4″E
- Country: Poland
- Voivodeship: West Pomeranian
- County: Gryfino
- Seat: Banie

Area
  - Total: 205.81 km^{2} (79.46 sq mi)

Population (2006)
  - Total: 6,350
  - Density: 30.9/km^{2} (79.9/sq mi)
- Website: http://www.banie.pl/

Gmina Banie is a rural gmina (administrative district) in Gryfino County, West Pomeranian Voivodeship, in north-western Poland. Its seat is the village of Banie, which lies approximately 21 kilometres (13 mi) south-east of Gryfino and 36 km (22 mi) south of the regional capital Szczecin.

The gmina covers an area of 205.81 square kilometres (79.5 sq mi), and as of 2006, its total population is 6,350.

== Villages ==
Gmina Banie contains the villages and settlements of Babinek, Banie, Baniewice, Dłusko Gryfińskie, Dłużyna, Górnowo, Górny Młyn, Kunowo, Lubanowo, Otoki, Parnica, Piaseczno, Piaskowo, Rożnowo, Skotniki, Sosnowo, Swobnica, Trzaski and Tywica.

== Neighbouring gminas ==
Gmina Banie is bordered by the gminas of Bielice, Chojna, Gryfino, Kozielice, Myślibórz, Pyrzyce, Trzcińsko-Zdrój and Widuchowa.
