= Tywica =

- Village
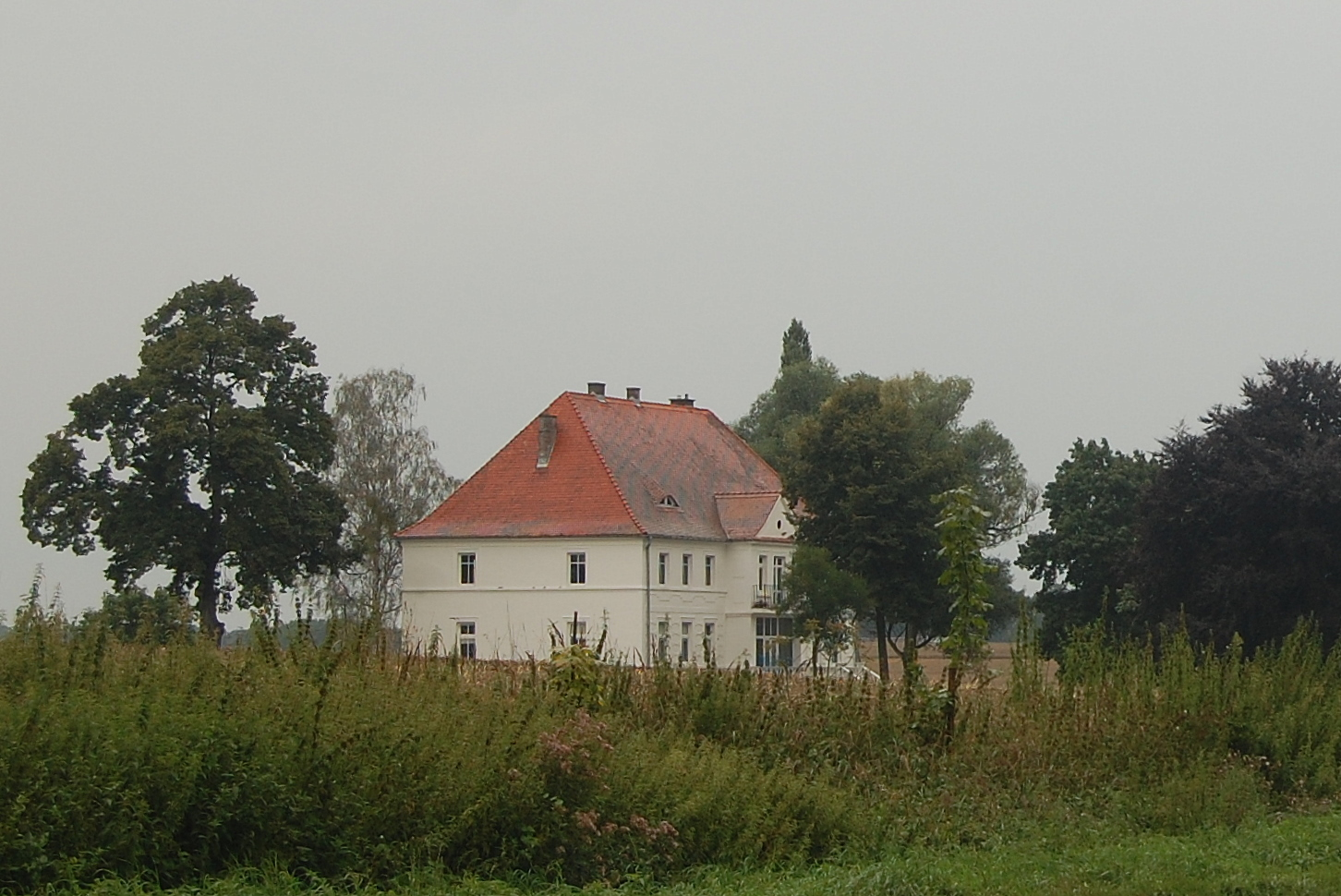

- Location within Poland
- Coordinates: 53°06′32″N 14°38′01″E
- Country: Poland
- Voivodeship: West Pomeranian
- County: Gryfino
- Gmina: Banie

Tywica [tɨˈvit͡sa] is a village in the administrative district of Gmina Banie, within Gryfino County, West Pomeranian Voivodeship, in north-western Poland.

For the history of the region, see History of Pomerania.
