= Parnica (Maglaj) =

Village in Maglaj, Bosnia and Herzegovina

- Village
- Location within Bosnia and Herzegovina
- Coordinates: 44°34′N 18°06′E
- Country: Bosnia and Herzegovina
- Entity: Federation of Bosnia and Herzegovina
- Canton: Zenica-Doboj
- Municipality: Maglaj

Area
  - Total: 0.31 sq mi (0.81 km^{2})

Population (2013)
  - Total: 70
  - Density: 220/sq mi (86/km^{2})
- Time zone: UTC+1 (CET)
  - Summer (DST): UTC+2 (CEST)

Parnica is a village in the municipality of Maglaj, Bosnia and Herzegovina.

== Demographics ==
According to the 2013 census, its population was 70.

Ethnicity in 2013
Ethnicity	Number	Percentage
Bosniaks	50	71.4%
Serbs	20	28.6%
Total	70	100%
