= Banie =

- Village
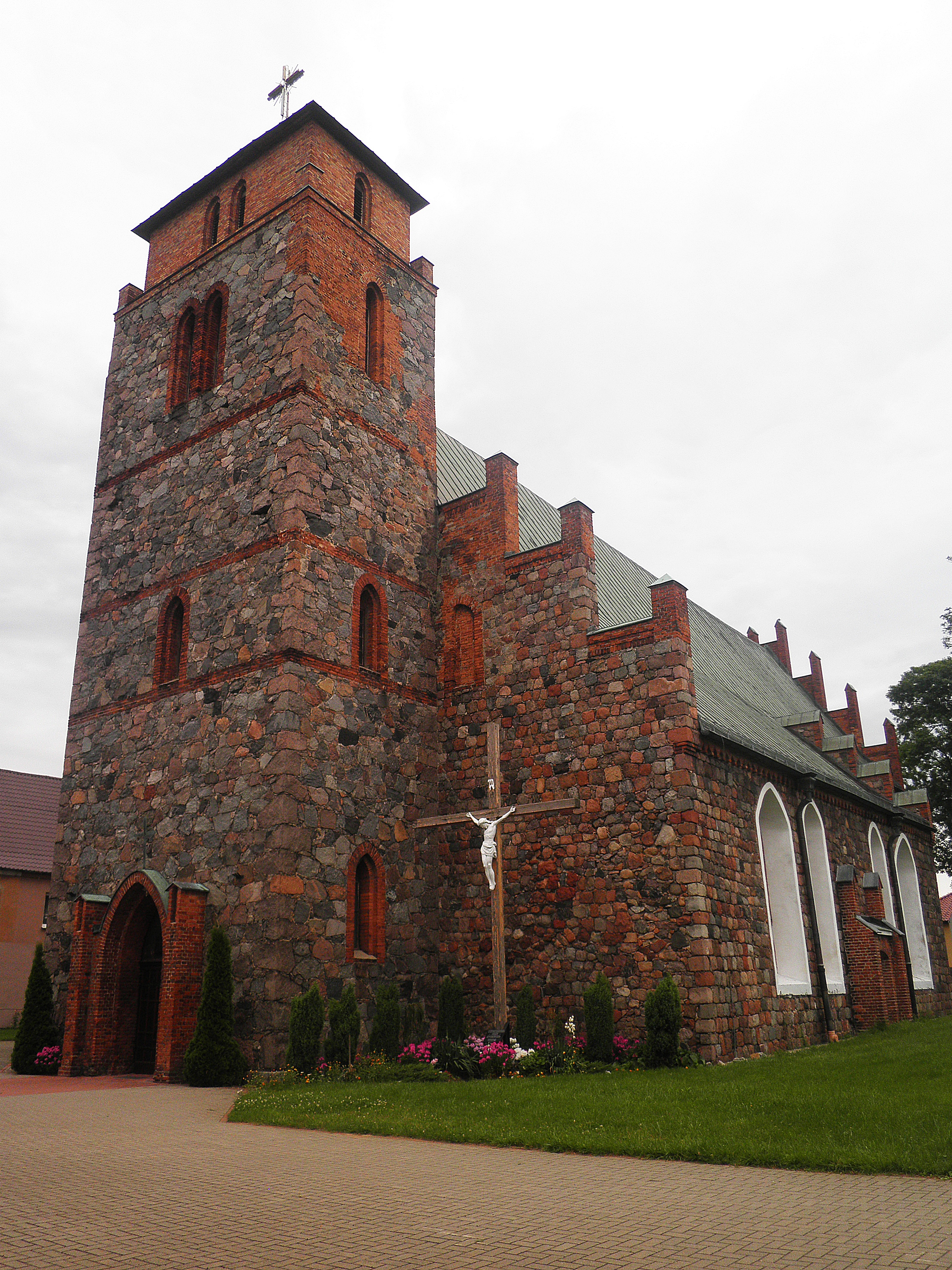
- Church of Our Lady of Perpetual Help

- Location within Poland
- Coordinates: 53°6′3″N 14°40′4″E
- Country: Poland
- Voivodeship: West Pomeranian
- County: Gryfino
- Gmina: Banie

Population
  - Total: 2,000
- Website: www.banie.pl

Banie [ˈbaɲɛ] (German: Bahn) is a village in Gryfino County, West Pomeranian Voivodeship, in north-western Poland. It is the seat of the gmina (administrative district) called Gmina Banie. It lies approximately 21 km (13 mi) south-east of Gryfino and 36 km (22 mi) south of the regional capital Szczecin.

There are four lakes within the city district, with the largest being Jezioro Dłużec with two public access beaches and number of fishing spots.

== Gallery ==
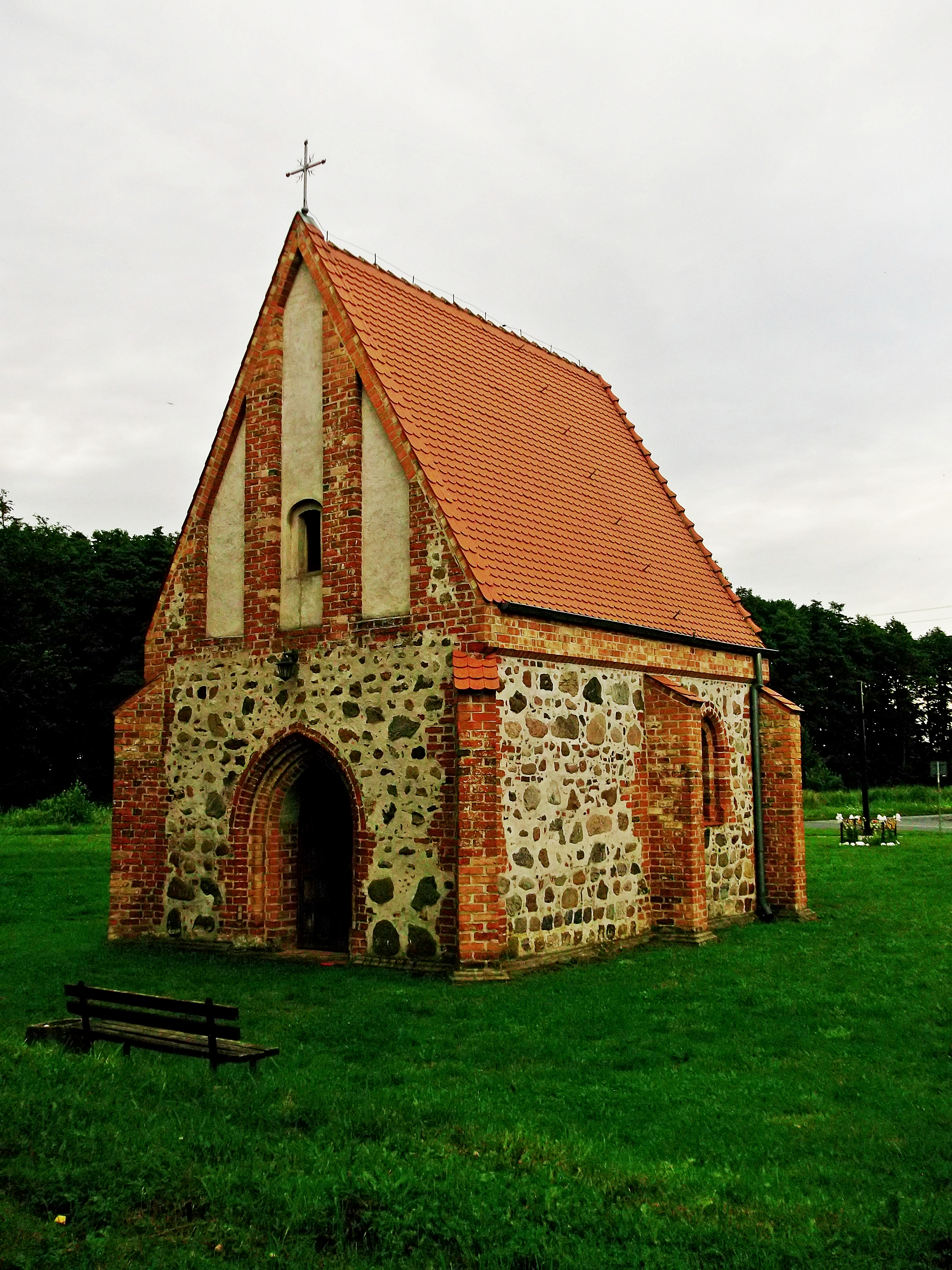
Chapel of Saint George from the early 15th century

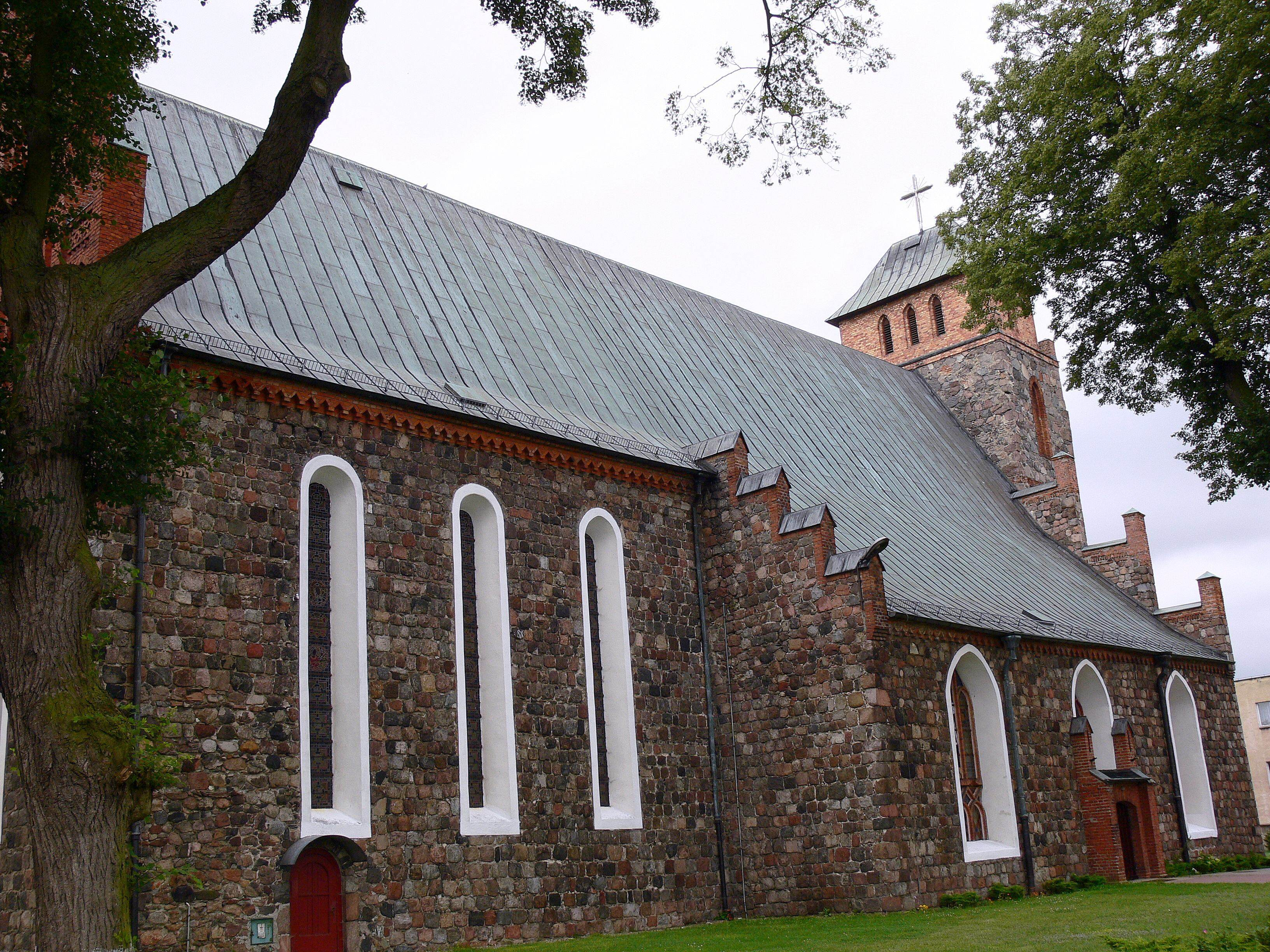
Main church in the village

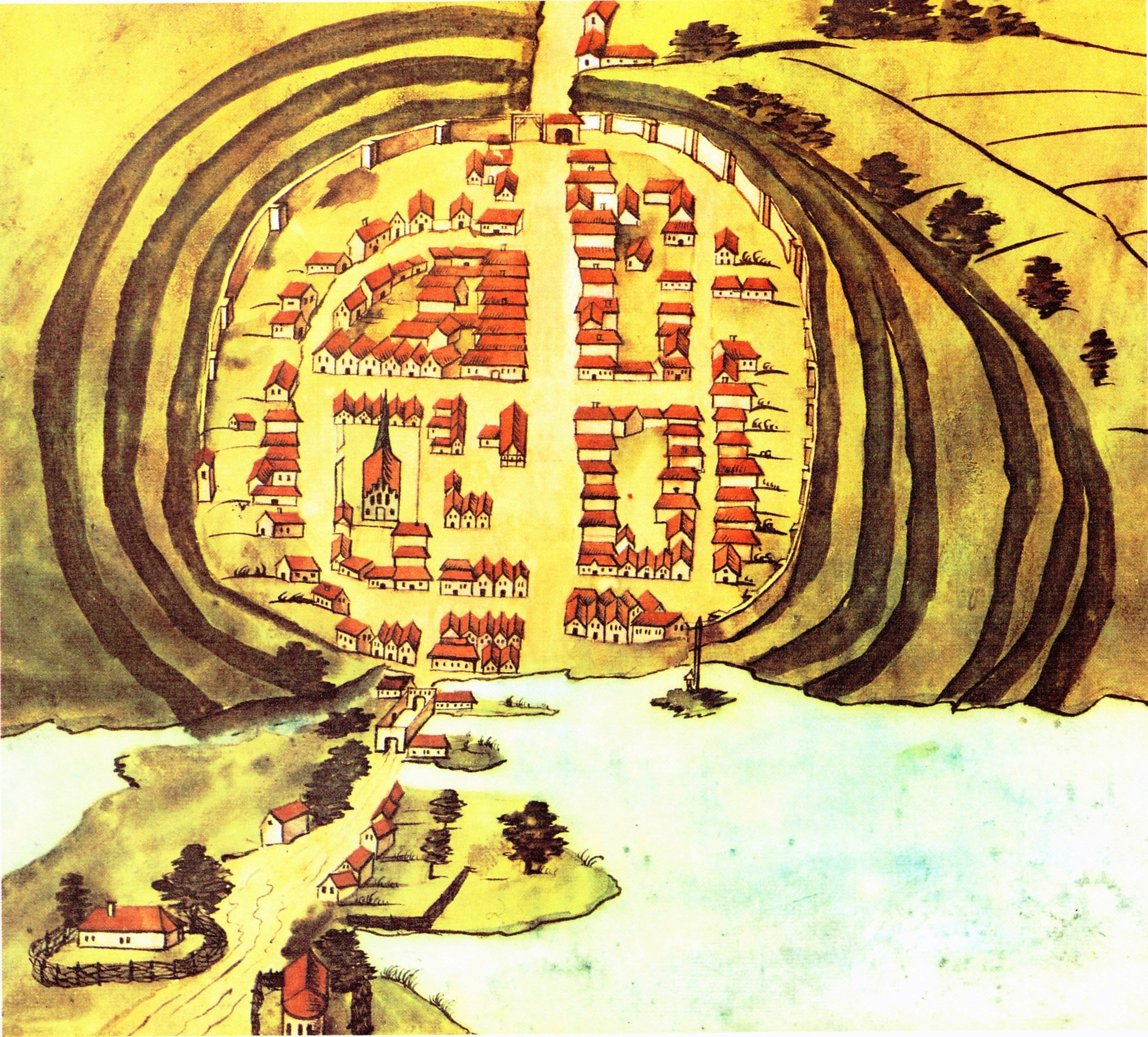
View of Banie in the year 1615
