= Trzcińsko-Zdrój =

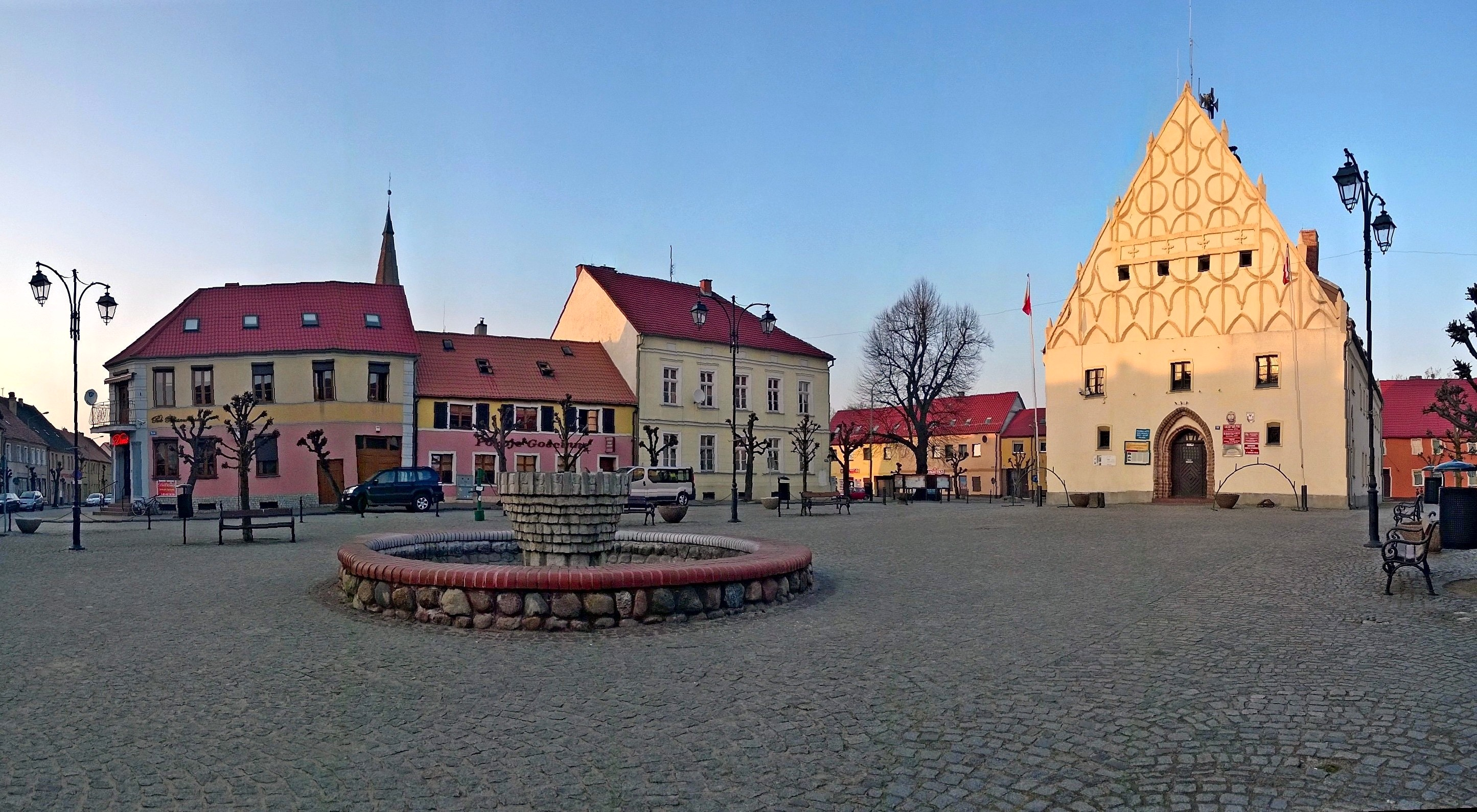
- Market square with town hall

- Coat of arms

- Location within Poland
- Coordinates: 52°58′N 14°37′E
- Country: Poland
- Voivodeship: West Pomeranian
- County: Gryfino
- Gmina: Trzcińsko-Zdrój

Area
  - Total: 2.3 km^{2} (0.89 sq mi)

Population (2023)
  - Total: 2,131
  - Density: 930/km^{2} (2,400/sq mi)
- Time zone: UTC+1 (CET)
  - Summer (DST): UTC+2 (CEST)
- Postal code: 74-510
- Vehicle registration: ZGR
- Website: http://www.trzcinsko-zdroj.pl

Trzcińsko-Zdrój [ˈtʂt͡ɕiɲskɔ ˈzdrui̯] (German: Bad Schönfließ; Kashubian: Szénflét) is a town in Gryfino County, West Pomeranian Voivodeship, Poland, with 2,131 inhabitants (2023). It is also the centre of an urban-rural municipality with the same name, an area of about 170 km^{2} (66 sq mi), and about 5,000 inhabitants (2023). The medieval Old Town, surrounded by a system of defensive walls and towers, is situated on the Rurzyca River and the western shore of Trzygłowskie Lake.

== History ==
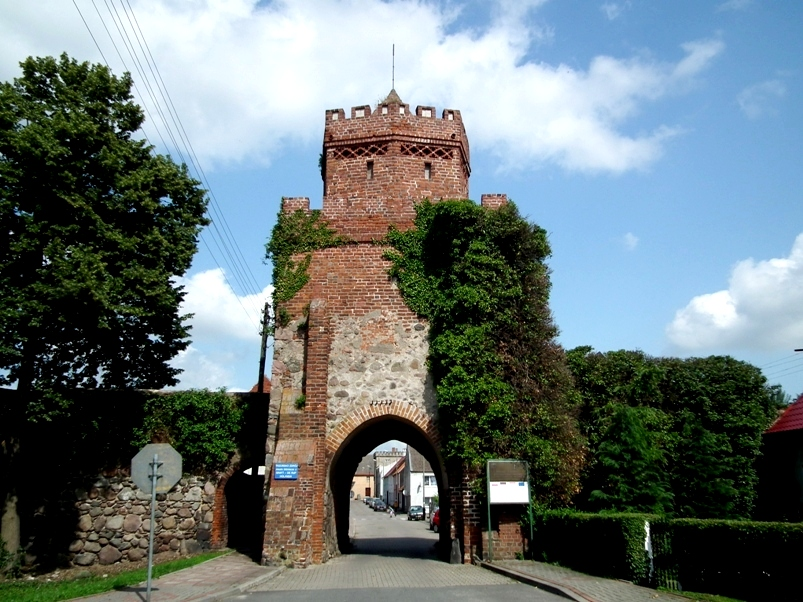
Brama Chojeńska (Chojna Gate)

The territory became part of the emerging Polish state under its first ruler Mieszko I in the 10th century. The town probably originated from a Pomeranian settlement at an important trading route between Poznań and the Baltic Sea and has been a commercial centre ever since. In 1248 the settlement was known as Sconenvlete. Shortly after, the area came under the jurisdiction of the Margraviate of Brandenburg. The merchant's house, built in the town centre in the 13th century, soon became the town hall. In 1281 the town was recorded as Schowenfliet which later changed into the High German Schönfliess.

In the 14th century the town gained additional rights such as the one to a free market and the exemption from customs within the New March. From 1373 the town was part of the Lands of the Bohemian Crown (or Czech Lands), ruled by the Luxembourg dynasty. In 1402, the Luxembourgs reached an agreement with Poland in Kraków. Poland was to buy and re-incorporate the town and its surroundings, but eventually the Luxembourgs sold it to the Teutonic Order, whose rule lasted until 1454. It was burned down in 1433 during the Hussite Wars. Margrave John of Custrin, who took over the area in 1538, introduced the teachings of the Protestant Reformation. During the Thirty Years' War Schönfliess suffered major damage during occupations by the Imperial army in 1627 and by the troops of Gustavus Adolphus of Sweden in 1630, and was burned down by Wallenstein's troops in 1634. After the Napoleonic Wars, economic development accelerated, and with the growth of the town, extra gates were broken into the old fortifications, parts of which were removed. Large parts of the town walls with several towers and two gates still exist to this day. Mud baths opened in Schönfliess in the late 19th century, and the town became a health resort and gained the official title Bad in 1907. Between 1871 and 1945 the town was part of Germany. After World War II, it became again part of Poland. The town was renamed to Trzcińsko-Zdrój. The spa closed in 1948 and was relocated to Połczyn-Zdrój, necessitated by the establishment of a Soviet airfield in nearby Chojna.

== Notable residents ==
- Paul Billerbeck (1853–1932), German Lutheran minister and scholar
- Max Kahlow (1894-?), German World War I flying ace
