= Voivodeship road 119 =

Road in Poland

Voivodeship Road 119
- Droga wojewódzka nr 119

Route information
- Maintained by Zachodnio Pomorski Zarząd Dróg Wojewódzkich
- Length: 12 km (7.5 mi)

Location
- Country: Poland
- Regions: West Pomeranian Voivodeship

Highway system
- National roads in Poland; Voivodeship roads
← DW 118	→ DW 120

Voivodeship road 119 (Polish: Droga wojewódzka nr 119, abbreviated DW 119) is a route in the Polish voivodeship roads network. The route links the village of Radziszewo with Gardno.

== Important settlements along the route ==
- Radziszewo
- Chlebowo
- Wysoka Gryfińska
- Gardno

== Route plan ==
km	Icon	Name	Crossed roads
x		Szczecin	—
x		Słubice	—
0		Radziszewo	
5		Chlebowo	—
8		Wysoka Gryfińska	—
11		Gardno	
12		—	
x		Gryfino	—
x		Motaniec	—
