= Lisi Potok =

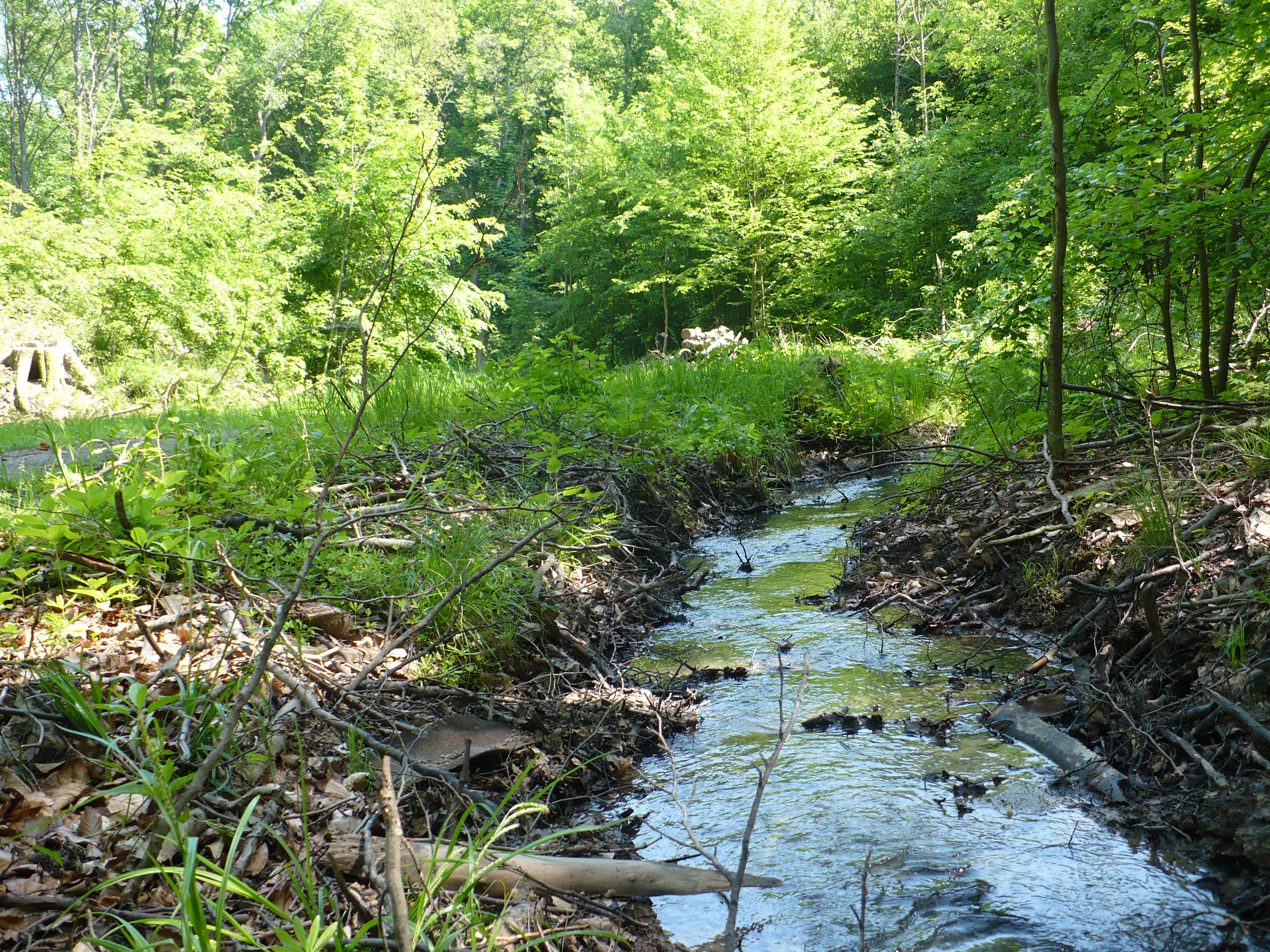

Location
- Country: Poland
- Voivodeship: West Pomeranian
- County (Powiat): Gryfino
- Gmina: Gmina Stare Czarnowo

Physical characteristics
- Source
  - location: north of Kołowo
  - coordinates: 53°19′53″N 14°40′56″E
- Mouth: Trawna
  - location: north of Kołówko
- Length: 3.6 km (2.2 mi)

Basin features
- Progression: Trawna→ Niedźwiedzianka→ Płonia→ Oder→ Baltic Sea

Lisi Potok is a river of Poland, a tributary of the Trawna.

== Tributaries ==
- Bukowa Woda

== See also ==
- List of rivers of Poland
