= Modrzewko =

- Settlement
- Location within Poland
- Coordinates: 53°18′19″N 14°40′6″E
- Country: Poland
- Voivodeship: West Pomeranian
- County: Gryfino
- Gmina: Stare Czarnowo

Modrzewko (Polish: [mɔdˈʐɛfkɔ]; German: Louisenhof) is a settlement in the administrative district of Gmina Stare Czarnowo, within Gryfino County, West Pomeranian Voivodeship, in north-western Poland. It lies approximately 8 km (5 mi) west of Stare Czarnowo, 14 km (9 mi) north-east of Gryfino, and 14 km (9 mi) south-east of the regional capital Szczecin.

For the history of the region, see History of Pomerania.
