= Osetne Pole =

- Former settlement
- Location within Poland
- Coordinates: 53°19′00″N 14°40′29″E
- Country: Poland
- Voivodeship: West Pomeranian
- County: Gryfino
- Gmina: Stare Czarnowo

Osetne Pole [ɔˈsɛtnɛ ˈpɔlɛ] (German: Karlsberg) is a former settlement in the administrative district of Gmina Stare Czarnowo, within Gryfino County, West Pomeranian Voivodeship, in north-western Poland. It lies approximately 9 km (6 mi) north-west of Stare Czarnowo, 14 km (9 mi) north-east of Gryfino, and 13 km (8 mi) south-east of the regional capital Szczecin.

For the history of the region, see History of Pomerania.
