= Gliniec, West Pomeranian Voivodeship =

Gliniec
- Settlement
- Location within Poland
- Coordinates: 53°17′43″N 14°43′31″E
- Country: Poland
- Voivodeship: West Pomeranian
- County: Gryfino
- Gmina: Stare Czarnowo

Gliniec [ˈɡliɲɛt͡s] (German Neu Glien) is a settlement in the administrative district of Gmina Stare Czarnowo, within Gryfino County, West Pomeranian Voivodeship, in north-western Poland. It lies approximately 4 km (2 mi) west of Stare Czarnowo, 17 km (11 mi) east of Gryfino, and 17 km (11 mi) south-east of the regional capital Szczecin.
