= Żelisławiec =

- Village
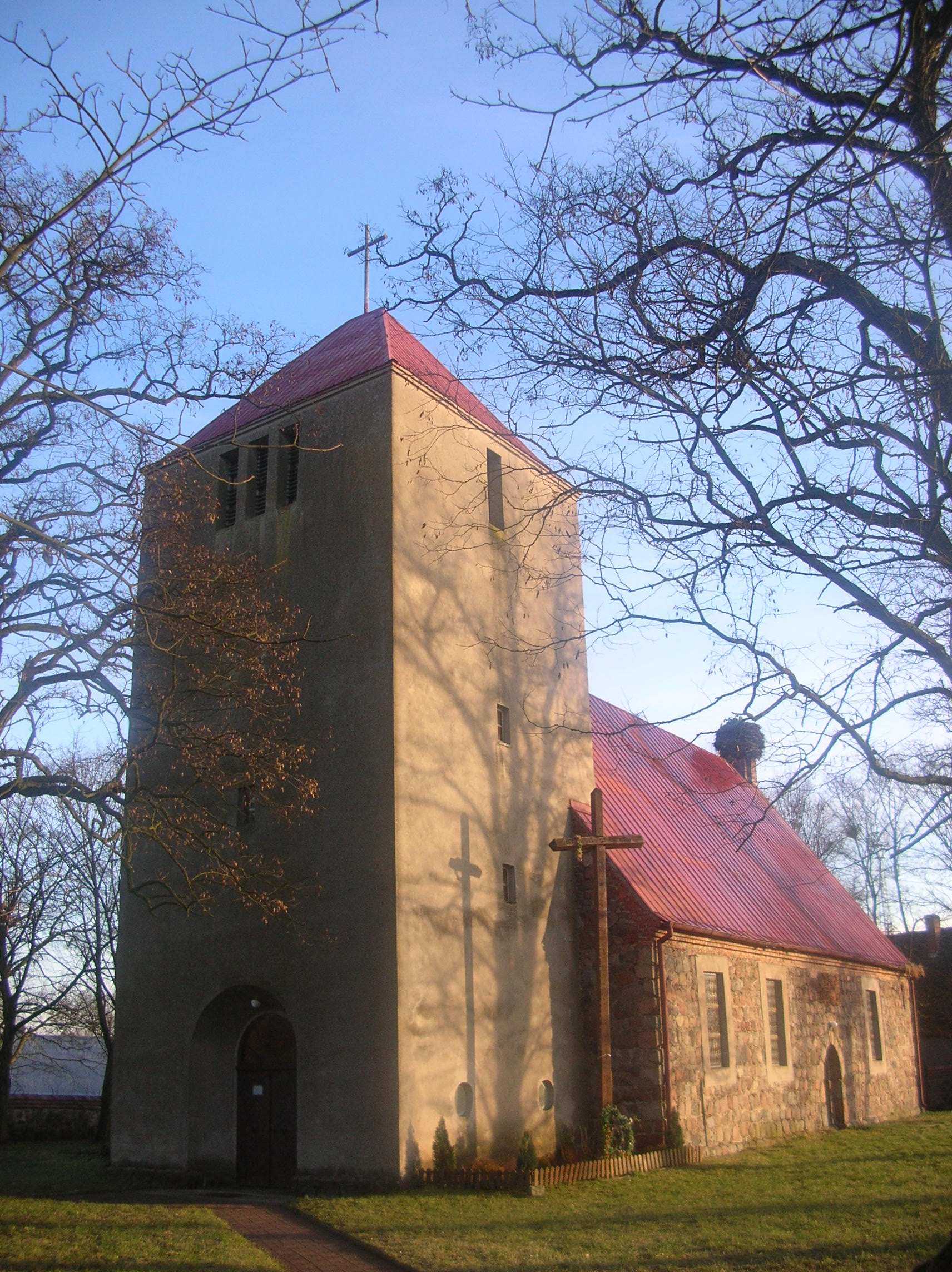
- Church of Blessed Virgin Mary Mother of the Church

- Location within Poland
- Coordinates: 53°16′28″N 14°40′19″E
- Country: Poland
- Voivodeship: West Pomeranian
- County: Gryfino
- Gmina: Stare Czarnowo

Żelisławiec [ʐɛliˈswavjɛt͡s] (German: Sinzlow) is a village in the administrative district of Gmina Stare Czarnowo, within Gryfino County, West Pomeranian Voivodeship, in north-western Poland. It lies approximately 7 km (4 mi) west of Stare Czarnowo, 14 km (9 mi) east of Gryfino, and 17 km (11 mi) south-east of the regional capital Szczecin.

For the history of the region, see History of Pomerania.
