= Binowo =

- Village
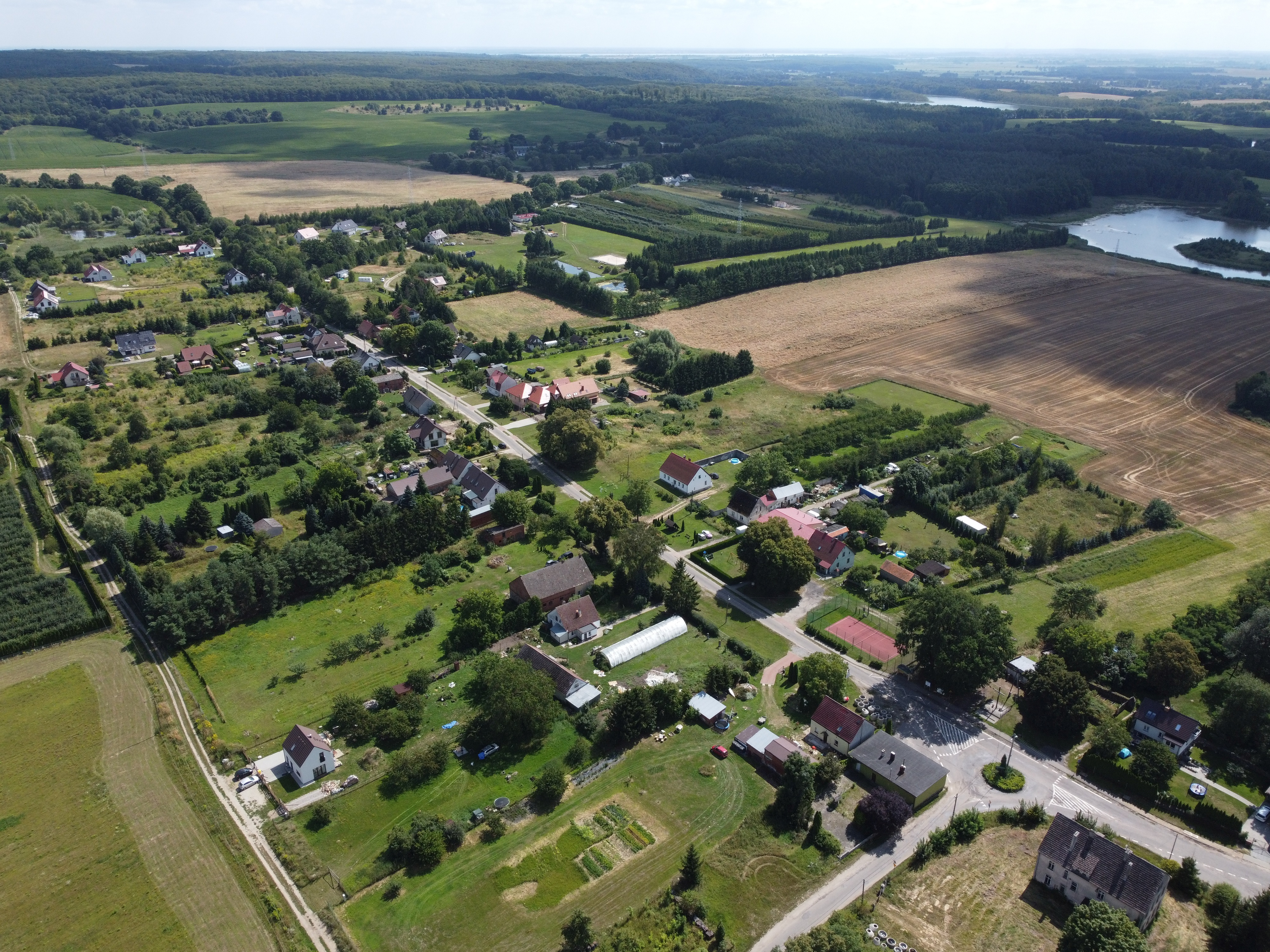

- Location within Poland
- Coordinates: 53°18′24″N 14°38′52″E
- Country: Poland
- Voivodeship: West Pomeranian
- County: Gryfino
- Gmina: Stare Czarnowo
- Population: 270

Binowo [biˈnɔvɔ] (German: Binow) is a village in the administrative district of Gmina Stare Czarnowo, within Gryfino County, West Pomeranian Voivodeship, in north-western Poland. It lies approximately 10 km (6 mi) west of Stare Czarnowo, 13 km (8 mi) north-east of Gryfino, and 13 km (8 mi) south of the regional capital Szczecin.

The village has a population of 270.

== See also ==
- History of Pomerania
