= Żelewo =

- Village
- Location within Poland
- Coordinates: 53°17′N 14°51′E
- Country: Poland
- Voivodeship: West Pomeranian
- County: Gryfino
- Gmina: Stare Czarnowo

Żelewo [ʐɛˈlɛvɔ] (German: Seelow) is a village in the administrative district of Gmina Stare Czarnowo, within Gryfino County, West Pomeranian Voivodeship, in north-western Poland. It lies approximately 5 km (3 mi) east of Stare Czarnowo, 25 km (16 mi) east of Gryfino, and 24 km (15 mi) south-east of the regional capital Szczecin.

For the history of the region, see History of Pomerania.
