= Kartno, West Pomeranian Voivodeship =

Kartno
- Village
- Location within Poland
- Coordinates: 53°16′N 14°41′E
- Country: Poland
- Voivodeship: West Pomeranian
- County: Gryfino
- Gmina: Stare Czarnowo

Kartno [ˈkartnɔ] (German: Kortenhagen) is a village in the administrative district of Gmina Stare Czarnowo, within Gryfino County, West Pomeranian Voivodeship, in north-western Poland. It lies approximately 7 km (4 mi) west of Stare Czarnowo, 14 km (9 mi) east of Gryfino, and 18 km (11 mi) south of the regional capital Szczecin.

For the history of the region, see History of Pomerania.
