= Voivodeship road 120 =

Road in Poland

Voivodeship Road 120
- Droga wojewódzka nr 120

Route information
- Maintained by Zachodnio Pomorski Zarząd Dróg Wojewódzkich
- Length: 37 km (23 mi)

Location
- Country: Poland
- Regions: West Pomeranian Voivodeship, Brandenburg

Highway system
- National roads in Poland; Voivodeship roads
← DW 119	→ DW 121

Voivodeship Road 120 (Polish: Droga wojewódzka nr 120, abbreviated DW 120) is a route in the Polish voivodeship roads network. The route links with the border crossing with Germany in Gryfino–Mescherin at the Motaniec junction with the National Road 10. The route runs through Gryfino County and Stargard County. After the village of Gardno the route joins with the S10 Expressway junction Gryfino.

During the 2024 Central European floods, on 3 October 2024, a section of the road between Gryfino and Mescherin was flooded, with transit temporarily diverted to other roads.

== Route plan ==
km	Icon	Name	Crossed roads
x		Germany	—
0		Border crossing with Germany Gryfino–Mescherin	—
0		Bridge over the river Oder	—
3		Bridge over the river Oder	—
4		Gryfino	
12		Gardno	
13		Gryfino	
37		Motaniec	
x		Szczecin	—
x		Płońsk	—
