= Binówko =

- Settlement
- Location within Poland
- Coordinates: 53°19′15″N 14°37′42″E
- Country: Poland
- Voivodeship: West Pomeranian
- County: Gryfino
- Gmina: Stare Czarnowo

Binówko [biˈnufkɔ] (German: Binower Spitze) is a settlement in the administrative district of Gmina Stare Czarnowo, within Gryfino County, West Pomeranian Voivodeship, in north-western Poland. It lies approximately 12 km (7 mi) north-west of Stare Czarnowo, 13 km (8 mi) north-east of Gryfino, and 12 km (7 mi) south of the regional capital Szczecin.

For the history of the region, see History of Pomerania.
