= Krzypnica =

- Village
- Location within Poland
- Coordinates: 53°11′10″N 14°28′1″E
- Country: Poland
- Voivodeship: West Pomeranian
- County: Gryfino
- Gmina: Gryfino

Krzypnica [kʂɨpˈnit͡sa] (German Kranzfelde) is a village in the administrative district of Gmina Gryfino, within Gryfino County, West Pomeranian Voivodeship, in north-western Poland, close to the German border. It lies approximately 8 km (5 mi) south of Gryfino and 27 km (17 mi) south of the regional capital Szczecin.

== See also ==
History of Pomerania
