= Szczecin Landscape Park =

Protected area in Poland

- Szczeciński Park Krajobrazowy "Puszcza Bukowa"
- IUCN category V (protected landscape/seascape)
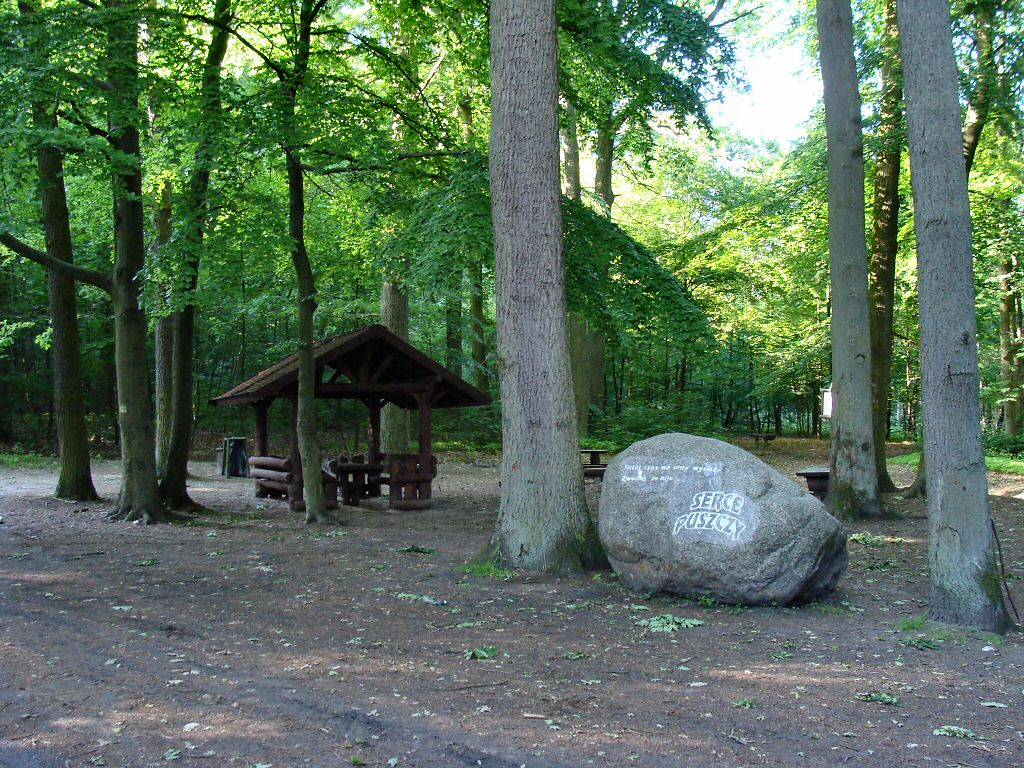
- Boulder "Serce Puszczy" (the Heart of the Forest) in Puszcza Bukowa
- Interactive map of Szczecin Landscape Park
- Location: West Pomeranian Voivodeship
- Coordinates: 53°20′N 14°40′E
- Area: 91 km^{2} (35 sq mi)
- Established: 1981

Szczecin Landscape Park "Beech Woods" (Polish: Szczeciński Park Krajobrazowy "Puszcza Bukowa") is a protected area (Landscape Park) in north-western Poland, established in 1981 and covering an area of 91 square kilometres (35 sq mi). Its full name refers to the dense forest known as Puszcza Bukowa ("beech forest"), which covers most of the area of the Park.

== Location ==
The Park lies within West Pomeranian Voivodeship, partly within the city of Szczecin, and partly in Gryfino County (Gmina Gryfino, Gmina Stare Czarnowo). It is composed of seven nature reserves from 24 hectares (59 acres) to 208 hectares (510 acres) in size.

== History ==
- 1889 — the Buchheide Verein Society of the Beech Forest Lovers is established in Szczecin, headed by Friedrich Meyer.
- 1940 — the Beech Forest is under landscape protection as Landschaftsschutzgebiet.
- 1956 — establishment of the following nature reserves: "Bukowe Zdroje", "Buczynowe Wąwozy", "Kołowskie Parowy", "Trawiasta Buczyna", "Źródłowowa Buczyna", "Bukowski Wąwóz" (liquidated in 1964), "Nad Wałeckie Pond" (liquidated in 1964).
- 1959 — establishment of the "Zdroje" nature reserve.
- 1971 — approval by the State Council for Nature Conservation of the concept of establishing a landscape park.
- 1977 — the voivodship authorities adopted a draft resolution establishing the Szczeciński Landscape Park, Ińsko Landscape Park and Cedynia Landscape Park.
- November 4, 1981 — establishment of the Iński and Szczeciński Landscape Parks Complex.
- 1991 — appointment of the Management Board of the Landscape Parks Complex in Ustowo.
- 1994 — establishment of the Directorate of the Iński and Szczecin Landscape Park in Szczecin.
- 1994 — establishment of the ecological site "Klucki Ostrów" and the nature and landscape complexes "Jezierzyce" and "Forest Park in Struga".
- 1995 — establishment of the ecological site "Zgniły Grzyb".
- 2000 — establishment of the Directorate of the Lower Oder Valley Landscape Parks in Gryfino (later the DDO Landscape Parks Complex).
- 2007 — approval by the European Commission of SAC Natura 2000 "Wzgórza Bukowe" (PLH320020).
- 2008 — establishment of the "Osetno" nature reserve.
- 2008 — establishment of the Department of Local Affairs in Gryfino for RDOŚ in Szczecin.
- 2012 — establishment of the Complex of Landscape Parks of the West Pomeranian Voivodeship, which included the Szczecin Landscape Park "Puszcza Bukowa".
