= Brynki =

Brynki may refer to the following places in Poland:

- Brynki Rekowskie
- Nowe Brynki
- Stare Brynki
