= Czepino =

- Village
- Location within Poland
- Coordinates: 53°17′N 14°31′E
- Country: Poland
- Voivodeship: West Pomeranian
- County: Gryfino
- Gmina: Gryfino
- Population: 412

Czepino [t͡ʂɛˈpinɔ] (German Wintersfelde) is a village in the administrative district of Gmina Gryfino, within Gryfino County, West Pomeranian Voivodeship, in north-western Poland, close to the German border. It lies approximately 5 km (3 mi) north-east of Gryfino and 16 km (10 mi) south of the regional capital Szczecin.

The village has a population of 412.

== See also ==
- History of Pomerania
