= Krajnik =

- Village
- Location within Poland
- Coordinates: 53°11′52″N 14°27′58″E
- Country: Poland
- Voivodeship: West Pomeranian
- County: Gryfino
- Gmina: Gryfino

Krajnik [ˈkrai̯nik] (German Buddenbrock) is a village in the administrative district of Gmina Gryfino, within Gryfino County, West Pomeranian Voivodeship, in north-western Poland, close to the German border. It lies approximately 6 km (4 mi) south of Gryfino and 26 km (16 mi) south of the regional capital Szczecin.
