= Bartkowo =

- Village
- Location within Poland
- Coordinates: 53°12′N 14°32′E
- Country: Poland
- Voivodeship: West Pomeranian
- County: Gryfino
- Gmina: Gryfino
- Population: 141

Bartkowo [bartˈkɔvɔ] (German Bartikow) is a village in the administrative district of Gmina Gryfino, within Gryfino County, West Pomeranian Voivodeship, in north-western Poland, close to the German border. It lies approximately 7 km (4 mi) south-east of Gryfino and 25 km (16 mi) south of the regional capital Szczecin.

The village has a population of 141.
