= Wełtyń =

- Village
- Location within Poland
- Coordinates: 53°15′32″N 14°34′40″E
- Country: Poland
- Voivodeship: West Pomeranian
- County: Gryfino
- Gmina: Gryfino
- Elevation: 30 m (98 ft)
- Population (approx.): 1,000

Wełtyń [ˈvɛu̯tɨɲ] (German Woltin) is a village in the administrative district of Gmina Gryfino, within Gryfino County, West Pomeranian Voivodeship, in north-western Poland, close to the German border. It lies approximately 7 km (4 mi) east of Gryfino and 18 km (11 mi) south of the regional capital Szczecin.

The village has an approximate population of 1000.

== See also ==
History of Pomerania
