= Wirów, West Pomeranian Voivodeship =

Wirów
- Village
- Location within Poland
- Coordinates: 53°13′N 14°33′E
- Country: Poland
- Voivodeship: West Pomeranian
- County: Gryfino
- Gmina: Gryfino

Wirów [ˈviruf] (formerly German Wierow) is a village in the administrative district of Gmina Gryfino, within Gryfino County, West Pomeranian Voivodeship, in north-western Poland, close to the German border. It lies approximately 6 km (4 mi) south-east of Gryfino and 23 km (14 mi) south of the regional capital, Szczecin.

For the history of the region, see History of Pomerania.
