= Kołowo =

- Village
- Location within Poland
- Coordinates: 53°19′32″N 14°40′54″E
- Country: Poland
- Voivodeship: West Pomeranian
- County: Gryfino
- Gmina: Stare Czarnowo

Kołowo [kɔˈwɔvɔ] (German: Kolow) is a village in the administrative district of Gmina Stare Czarnowo, within Gryfino County, West Pomeranian Voivodeship, in north-western Poland. It lies approximately 9 km (6 mi) north-west of Stare Czarnowo, 16 km (10 mi) north-east of Gryfino, and 13 km (8 mi) south-east of the regional capital Szczecin.
