= Dołgie, Gryfino County =

Dołgie
- Village
- Location within Poland
- Coordinates: 53°10′35″N 14°39′11″E
- Country: Poland
- Voivodeship: West Pomeranian
- County: Gryfino
- Gmina: Gryfino
- Population: 299

Dołgie [ˈdɔu̯ɡʲɛ] (German: Langenhagen) is a village in the administrative district of Gmina Gryfino, within Gryfino County, West Pomeranian Voivodeship, in north-western Poland, close to the German border. It lies approximately 14 km (9 mi) south-east of Gryfino and 28 km (17 mi) south of the regional capital Szczecin.

== See also ==
History of Pomerania
