= Pniewo, Gryfino County =

Pniewo
- Village
- Location within Poland
- Coordinates: 53°12′N 14°30′E
- Country: Poland
- Voivodeship: West Pomeranian
- County: Gryfino
- Gmina: Gryfino

Pniewo [ˈpɲɛvɔ] (formerly German Bremerheide) is a village in the administrative district of Gmina Gryfino, within Gryfino County, West Pomeranian Voivodeship, in north-western Poland, close to the German border. It lies approximately 6 km (4 mi) south of Gryfino and 25 km (16 mi) south of the regional capital Szczecin.

For the history of the region, see History of Pomerania.
