= Chwarstnica =

- Village
- Location within Poland
- Coordinates: 53°13′19″N 14°36′38″E
- Country: Poland
- Voivodeship: West Pomeranian
- County: Gryfino
- Gmina: Gryfino
- Population: 315

Chwarstnica [xfarstˈnit͡sa] (German: Klein Schönfeld) is a village in the administrative district of Gmina Gryfino, within Gryfino County, West Pomeranian Voivodeship, in north-western Poland, close to the German border. It lies approximately 10 km (6 mi) east of Gryfino and 22 km (14 mi) south of the regional capital Szczecin.

The village has a population of 315.
