= Daleszewo =

- Village
- Location within Poland
- Coordinates: 53°18′52″N 14°32′3″E
- Country: Poland
- Voivodeship: West Pomeranian
- County: Gryfino
- Gmina: Gryfino
- Population (approx.): 1,100

Daleszewo [dalɛˈʂɛvɔ] (German Ferdinandstein) is a village in the administrative district of Gmina Gryfino, within Gryfino County, West Pomeranian Voivodeship, in north-western Poland, close to the German border. It lies approximately 8 km (5 mi) north-east of Gryfino and 12 km (7 mi) south of the regional capital Szczecin.

The village has an approximate population of 1,100.

== See also ==
- History of Pomerania
