= Żórawie =

- Village
- Location within Poland
- Coordinates: 53°13′N 14°31′E
- Country: Poland
- Voivodeship: West Pomeranian
- County: Gryfino
- Gmina: Gryfino

Żórawie [ʐuˈravjɛ] (German Kronheide) is a village in the administrative district of Gmina Gryfino, within Gryfino County, West Pomeranian Voivodeship, in north-western Poland, close to the German border. It lies approximately 5 km (3 mi) south-east of Gryfino and 23 km (14 mi) south of the regional capital Szczecin.
