= Skrzynice, West Pomeranian Voivodeship =

Skrzynice
- Village
- Location within Poland
- Coordinates: 53°13′8″N 14°40′39″E
- Country: Poland
- Voivodeship: West Pomeranian
- County: Gryfino
- Gmina: Gryfino

Skrzynice [skʂɨˈnit͡sɛ] (German: Karlshof) is a village in the administrative district of Gmina Gryfino, within Gryfino County, West Pomeranian Voivodeship, in north-western Poland, close to the German border. It lies approximately 14 km (9 mi) east of Gryfino and 23 km (14 mi) south of the regional capital Szczecin.

For the history of the region, see History of Pomerania.

== Notable residents ==
- Heinz Furbach (1895–1968), Wehrmacht general
