= Łubnica, West Pomeranian Voivodeship =

Łubnica
- Village
- Location within Poland
- Coordinates: 53°19′8″N 14°31′33″E
- Country: Poland
- Voivodeship: West Pomeranian
- County: Gryfino
- Gmina: Gryfino
- Population: 40

Łubnica [wubˈnit͡sa] (German: Bienenwerder) is a village in the administrative district of Gmina Gryfino, within Gryfino County, West Pomeranian Voivodeship, in north-western Poland, close to the German border. It lies approximately 9 km (6 mi) north of Gryfino and 12 km (7 mi) south of the regional capital Szczecin.

The village has a population of 40.

== See also ==
History of Pomerania
