= Gajki, West Pomeranian Voivodeship =

Gajki
- Village
- Location within Poland
- Coordinates: 53°11′37″N 14°32′3″E
- Country: Poland
- Voivodeship: West Pomeranian
- County: Gryfino
- Gmina: Gryfino
- Population: 20

Gajki [ˈɡai̯ki] (German: Uhlenhorst) is a village in the administrative district of Gmina Gryfino, within Gryfino County, West Pomeranian Voivodeship, in north-western Poland, close to the German border. It lies approximately 8 km (5 mi) south-east of Gryfino and 25 km (16 mi) south of the regional capital Szczecin.

The village has a population of 20.

== See also ==
- History of Pomerania
