= Żabnica, West Pomeranian Voivodeship =

Żabnica
- Village
- Location within Poland
- Coordinates: 53°17′N 14°29′E
- Country: Poland
- Voivodeship: West Pomeranian
- County: Gryfino
- Gmina: Gryfino
- Population: 420

Żabnica [ʐabˈnit͡sa] (German Mönchskappe) is a village in the administrative district of Gmina Gryfino, within Gryfino County, West Pomeranian Voivodeship, in north-western Poland, close to the German border. It lies approximately 4 km (2 mi) north of Gryfino and 17 km (11 mi) south-west of the regional capital Szczecin.

The village has a population of 420.
