= Steklno =

- Village
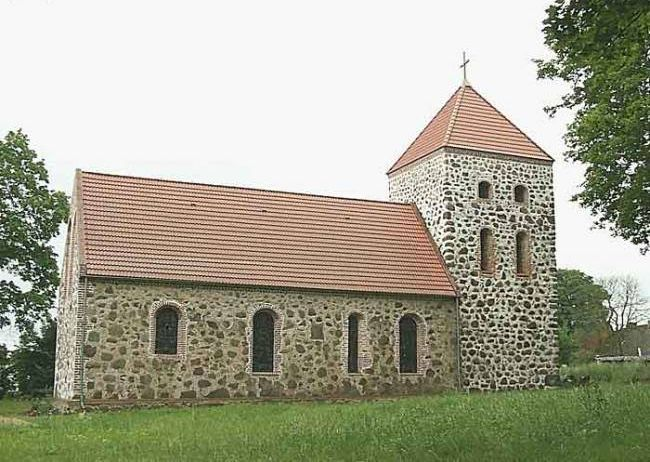
- Church of Saint Christopher

- Location within Poland
- Coordinates: 53°10′N 14°32′E
- Country: Poland
- Voivodeship: West Pomeranian
- County: Gryfino
- Gmina: Gryfino

Population
  - Total: 166

Steklno [ˈstɛklnɔ] (German Stecklin) is a village in the administrative district of Gmina Gryfino, within Gryfino County, West Pomeranian Voivodeship, in north-western Poland, close to the German border. It lies approximately 10 km (6 mi) south of Gryfino and 28 km (17 mi) south of the regional capital Szczecin.

In 2011, the village had a population of 250.

Steklno has their own football team called "Wicher Steklno".

== See also ==
- History of Pomerania
