= Borzym =

- Village
- Location within Poland
- Coordinates: 53°11′30″N 14°37′20″E
- Country: Poland
- Voivodeship: West Pomeranian
- County: Gryfino
- Gmina: Gryfino
- Population: 325
- Website: http://borzym.ovh.org/

Borzym [ˈbɔʐɨm] (German Borin) is a village in the administrative district of Gmina Gryfino, within Gryfino County, West Pomeranian Voivodeship, in north-western Poland, close to the German border. It lies approximately 12 km (7 mi) south-east of Gryfino and 26 km (16 mi) south of the regional capital Szczecin.

The village has a population of 325.
