= Drzenin =

- Village
- Location within Poland
- Coordinates: 53°14′N 14°39′E
- Country: Poland
- Voivodeship: West Pomeranian
- County: Gryfino
- Gmina: Gryfino
- Population: 280

Drzenin [ˈdʐɛnin] (German Neuhaus) is a village in the administrative district of Gmina Gryfino, within Gryfino County, West Pomeranian Voivodeship, in north-western Poland, close to the German border. It lies approximately 12 km (7 mi) east of Gryfino and 21 km (13 mi) south of the regional capital Szczecin.

The village has a population of 280.

== See also ==
History of Pomerania
