= Chlebowo, Gryfino County =

Chlebowo
- Village
- Location within Poland
- Coordinates: 53°18′32″N 14°35′43″E
- Country: Poland
- Voivodeship: West Pomeranian
- County: Gryfino
- Gmina: Gryfino
- Population: 157

Chlebowo [xlɛˈbɔvɔ] (German Klebow) is a village in the administrative district of Gmina Gryfino, within Gryfino County, West Pomeranian Voivodeship, in north-western Poland, close to the German border. It lies approximately 10 km (6 mi) north-east of Gryfino and 12 km (7 mi) south of the regional capital Szczecin.

The village has a population of 157.

== See also ==
- History of Pomerania
