= Śremsko =

- Settlement
- Location within Poland
- Coordinates: 53°11′10″N 14°33′48″E
- Country: Poland
- Voivodeship: West Pomeranian
- County: Gryfino
- Gmina: Gryfino

Śremsko [ˈɕrɛmskɔ] is a settlement in the administrative district of Gmina Gryfino, within Gryfino County, West Pomeranian Voivodeship, in north-western Poland, close to the German border.

For the history of the region, see History of Pomerania.
