= Małolesie =

- Settlement
- Location within Poland
- Coordinates: 53°17′43″N 14°43′30″E
- Country: Poland
- Voivodeship: West Pomeranian
- County: Gryfino
- Gmina: Stare Czarnowo

Małolesie (Polish pronunciation: [mawɔˈlɛɕɛ]; German Glien Försterei) is a settlement in the administrative district of Gmina Stare Czarnowo, within Gryfino County, West Pomeranian Voivodeship, in north-western Poland.

For the history of the region, see History of Pomerania.
