= Ciosna, West Pomeranian Voivodeship =

Ciosna
- Settlement
- Location within Poland
- Coordinates: 53°11′11″N 14°32′21″E
- Country: Poland
- Voivodeship: West Pomeranian
- County: Gryfino
- Gmina: Gryfino

Ciosna [ˈt͡ɕɔsna] (German: Dorotheenhof) is a settlement in the administrative district of Gmina Gryfino, within Gryfino County, West Pomeranian Voivodeship, in north-western Poland, close to the German border.

== See also ==
- History of Pomerania.
