= Komorówko, West Pomeranian Voivodeship =

Komorówko
- Village
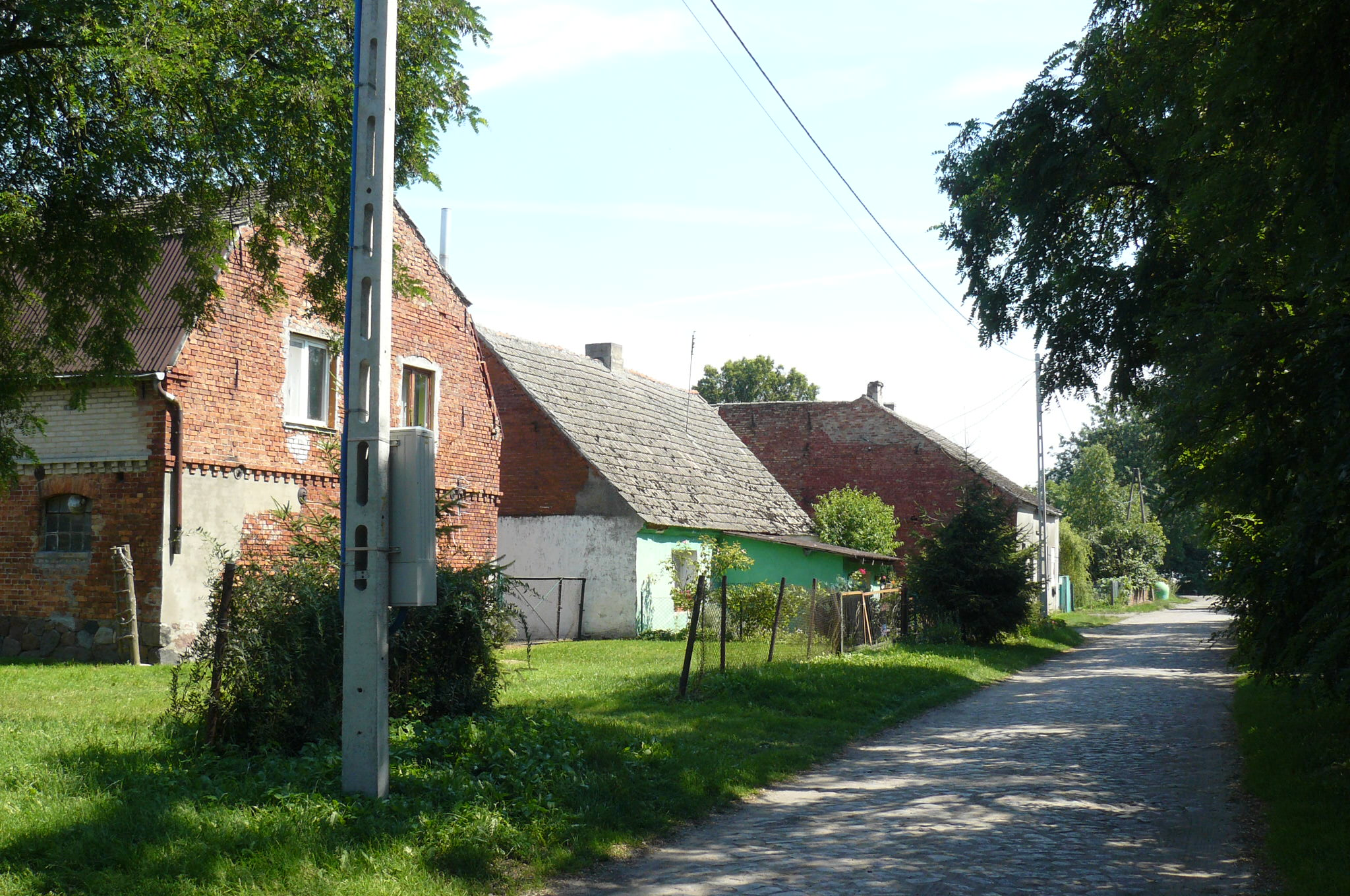
- Houses by the roadside in Komorówko

- Location within Poland
- Coordinates: 53°15′23″N 14°49′55″E
- Country: Poland
- Voivodeship: West Pomeranian
- County: Gryfino
- Gmina: Stare Czarnowo

Komorówko [kɔmɔˈrufkɔ] (German: Geiblershof) is a village in the administrative district of Gmina Stare Czarnowo, within Gryfino County, West Pomeranian Voivodeship, in north-western Poland.

For the history of the region, see History of Pomerania.
