= Sobiemyśl =

- Village
- Location within Poland
- Coordinates: 53°11′19″N 14°40′55″E
- Country: Poland
- Voivodeship: West Pomeranian
- County: Gryfino
- Gmina: Gryfino

Sobiemyśl [sɔˈbjɛmɨɕl] (formerly German: Frankenberg) is a village in the administrative district of Gmina Gryfino, within Gryfino County, West Pomeranian Voivodeship, in north-western Poland, close to the German border.
