= Dębina, West Pomeranian Voivodeship =

Dębina
- Village
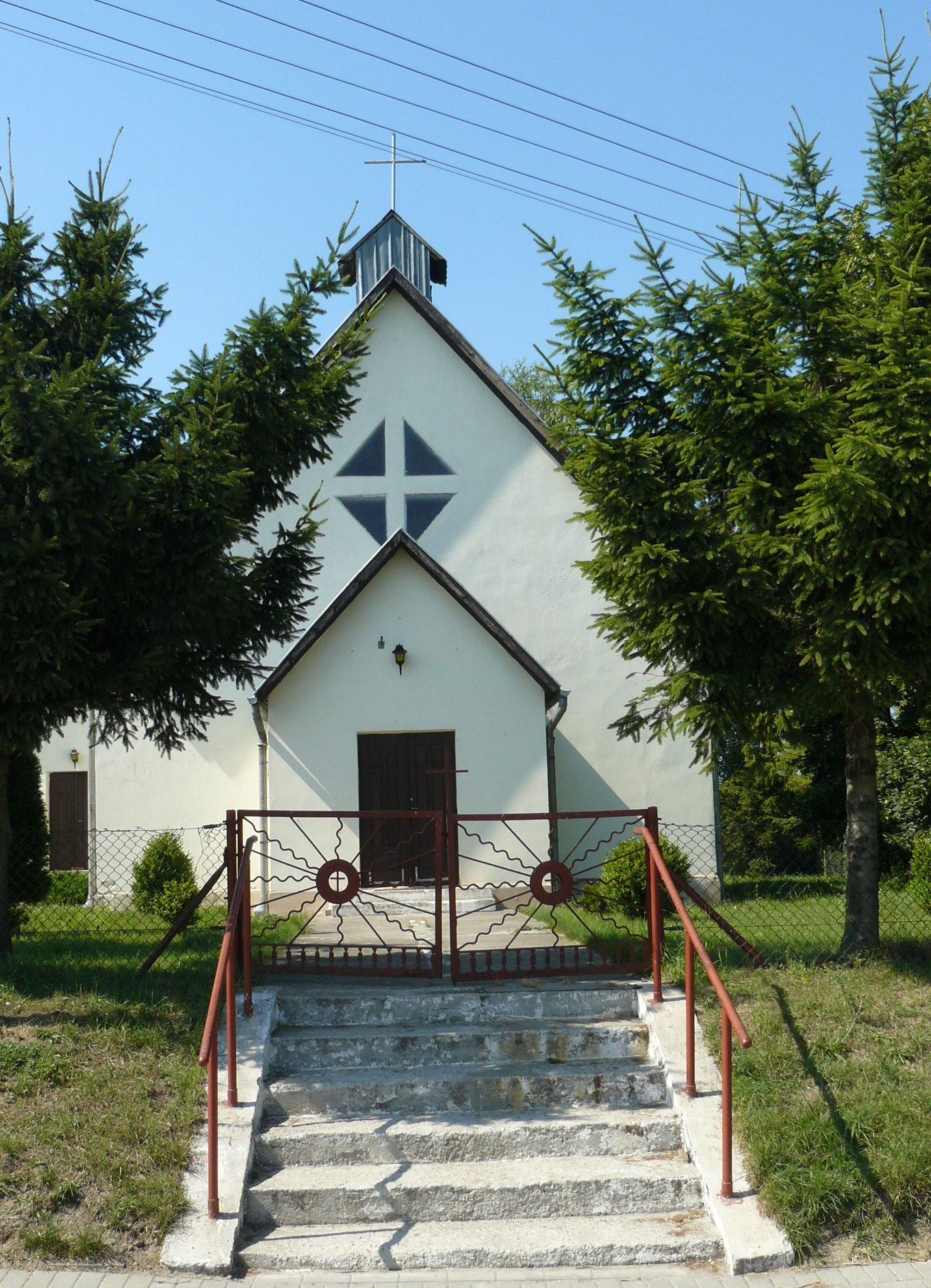
- Church in Dębina

- Location within Poland
- Coordinates: 53°16′23″N 14°49′11″E
- Country: Poland
- Voivodeship: West Pomeranian
- County: Gryfino
- Gmina: Stare Czarnowo

Dębina [dɛmˈbina] (German: Hofdamm) is a village in the administrative district of Gmina Stare Czarnowo, within Gryfino County, West Pomeranian Voivodeship, in north-western Poland.
