= Dębce =

- Village
- Location within Poland
- Coordinates: 53°18′21″N 14°30′30″E
- Country: Poland
- Voivodeship: West Pomeranian
- County: Gryfino
- Gmina: Gryfino

Dębce [ˈdɛmpt͡sɛ] (German Eichwerder) is a village in the administrative district of Gmina Gryfino, within Gryfino County, West Pomeranian Voivodeship, in north-western Poland, close to the German border.

== See also ==
History of Pomerania
