= Nowe Czarnowo =

- Village
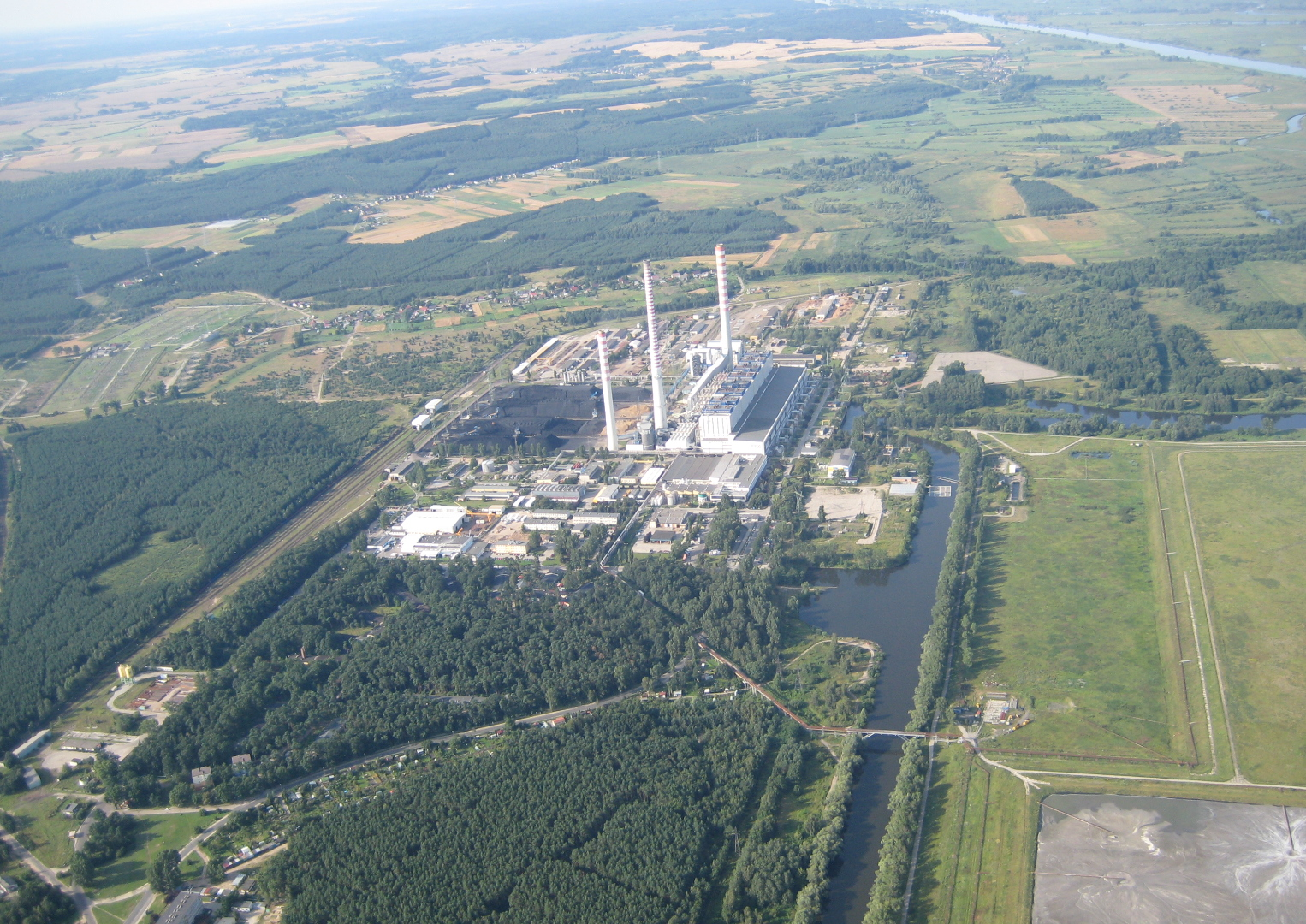
- Nowe Czarnowo with Dolna Odra Power Station in background

- Location within Poland
- Coordinates: 53°11′N 14°29′E
- Country: Poland
- Voivodeship: West Pomeranian
- County: Gryfino
- Gmina: Gryfino
- Population: 660
- Time zone: UTC+1 (CET)
  - Summer (DST): UTC+2 (CEST)
- Vehicle registration: ZGR
- Primary airport: Solidarity Szczecin–Goleniów Airport

Nowe Czarnowo [ˈnɔvɛ t͡ʂarˈnɔvɔ] (German: Neu Zarnow) is a village in the administrative district of Gmina Gryfino, within Gryfino County, West Pomeranian Voivodeship, in north-western Poland, close to the German border. It lies approximately 8 km (5 mi) south of Gryfino and 27 km (17 mi) south of the regional capital Szczecin.

The village has a population of approximately 660 residents. The Dolna Odra Power Station is located in the vicinity. Also nearby is a forest of oddly twisted trees, known as the Crooked Forest (Polish: Krzywy Las), a phenomenon which remains unsolved to this day.
