= Wysoka Gryfińska =

- Settlement
- Location within Poland
- Coordinates: 53°17′14″N 14°36′47″E
- Country: Poland
- Voivodeship: West Pomeranian
- County: Gryfino
- Gmina: Gryfino

Wysoka Gryfińska [vɨˈsɔka ɡrɨˈfiɲska] (German Wittstock) is a settlement in the administrative district of Gmina Gryfino, within Gryfino County, West Pomeranian Voivodeship, in north-western Poland, close to the German border. It lies approximately 10 km (6 mi) north-east of Gryfino and 15 km (9 mi) south of the regional capital Szczecin.
