= Mielenko Gryfińskie =

- Village
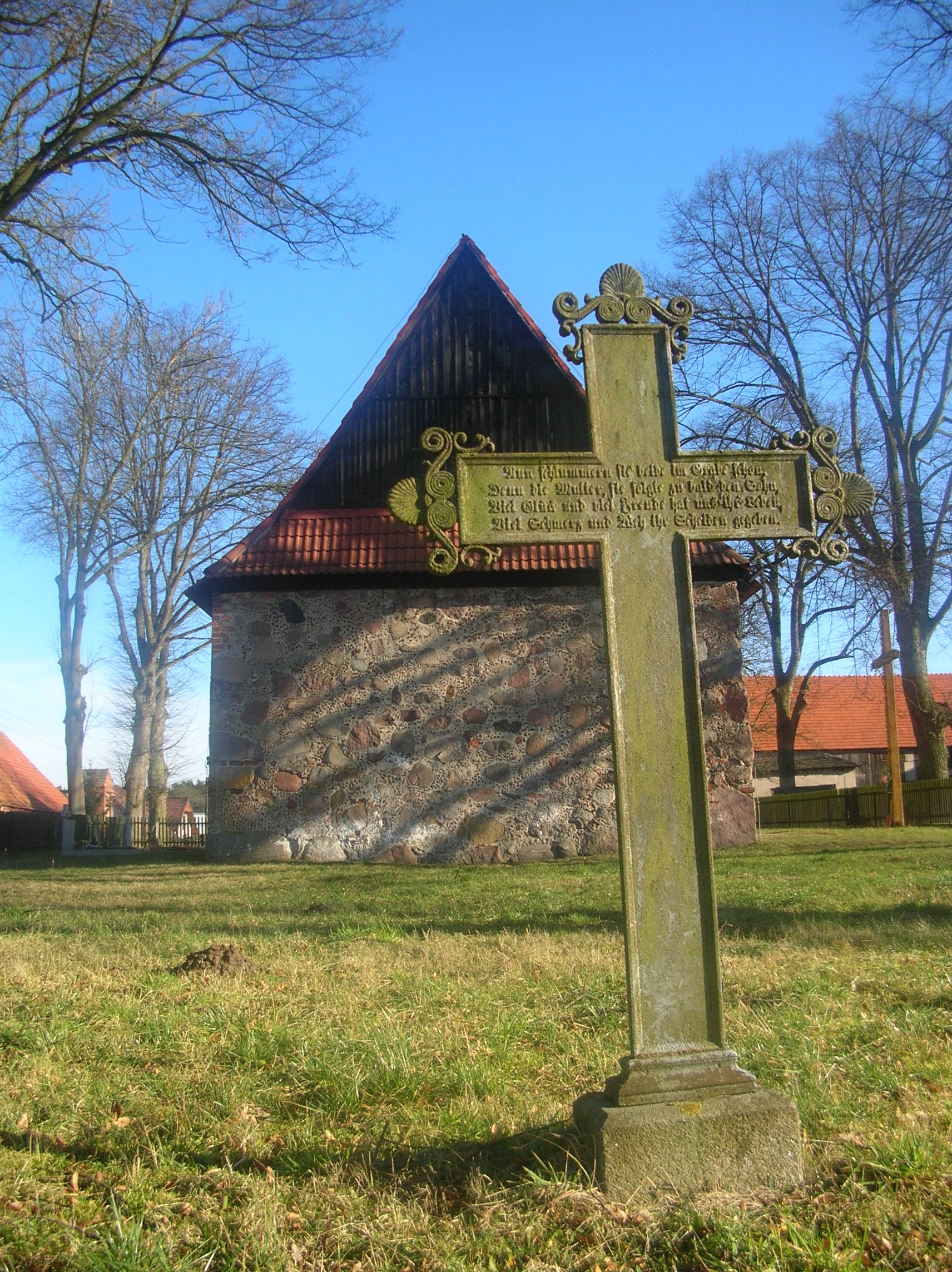

- Location within Poland
- Coordinates: 53°12′25″N 14°34′39″E
- Country: Poland
- Voivodeship: West Pomeranian
- County: Gryfino
- Gmina: Gryfino

Mielenko Gryfińskie [mjɛˈlɛnkɔ ɡrɨˈfiɲskʲɛ] (German Klein Möllen) is a village in the administrative district of Gmina Gryfino, within Gryfino County, West Pomeranian Voivodeship, in north-western Poland, close to the German border.
