= Stare Brynki =

- Village
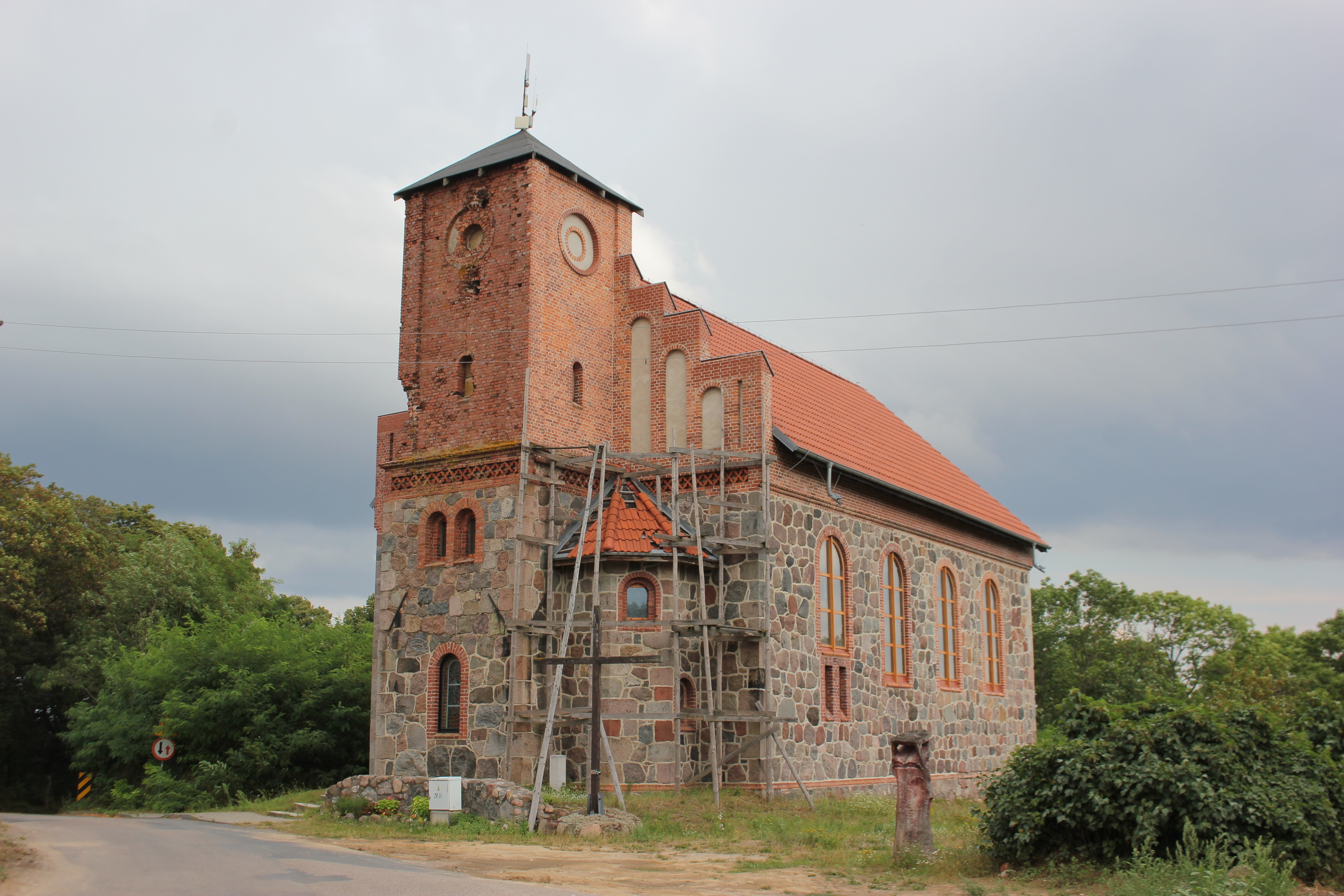
- Church in Stare Brynki

- Location within Poland
- Coordinates: 53°17′47″N 14°33′30″E
- Country: Poland
- Voivodeship: West Pomeranian
- County: Gryfino
- Gmina: Gryfino

Stare Brynki [ˈstarɛ ˈbrɨnki] (German: Brünken) is a village in the administrative district of Gmina Gryfino, within Gryfino County, West Pomeranian Voivodeship, in north-western Poland, close to the German border. It lies approximately 8 km (5 mi) north-east of Gryfino and 14 km (9 mi) south of the regional capital Szczecin.

== See also ==
- History of Pomerania
