= Sobieradz, Gryfino County =

Sobieradz
- Village
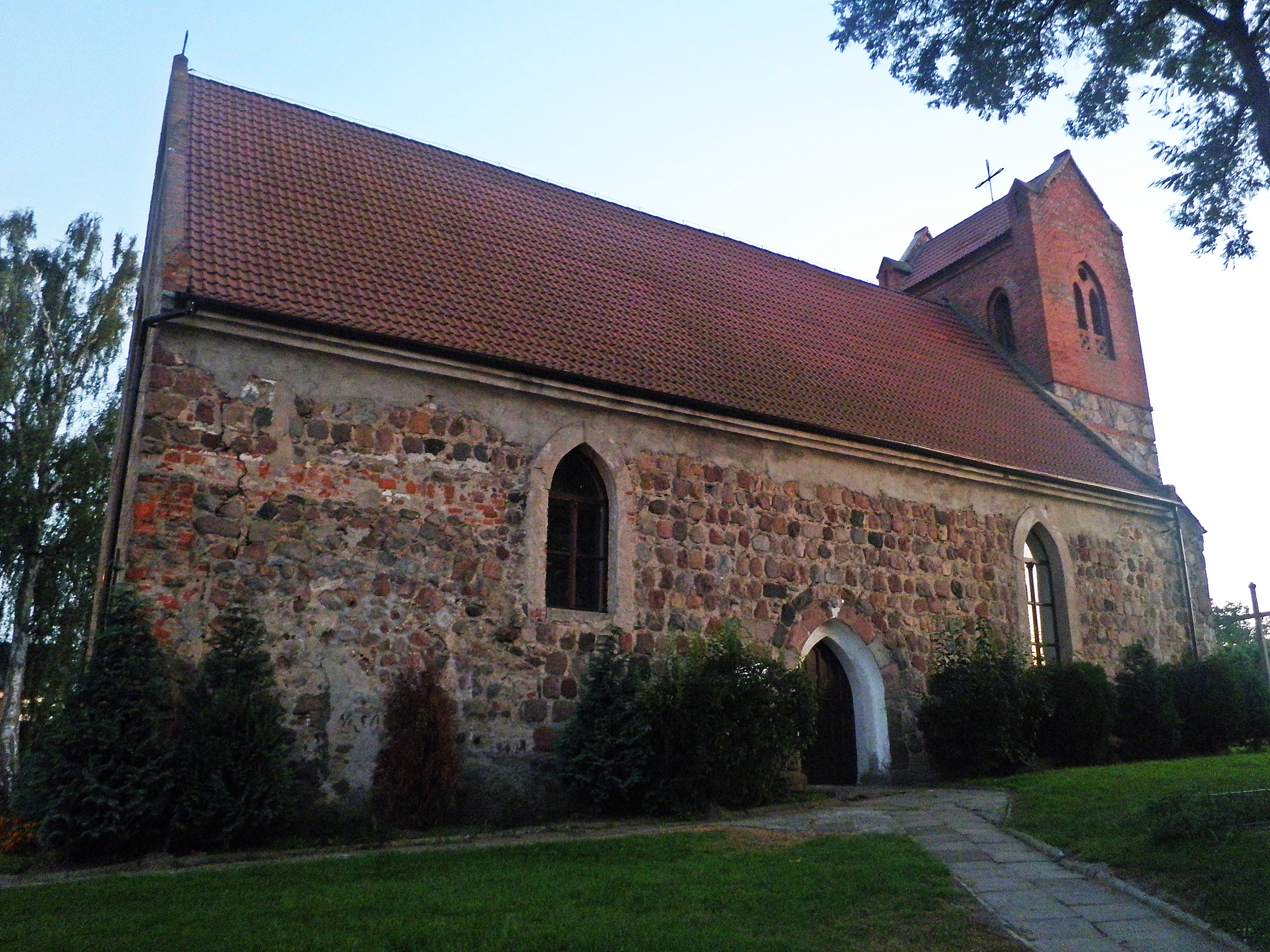

- Location within Poland
- Coordinates: 53°13′34″N 14°39′28″E
- Country: Poland
- Voivodeship: West Pomeranian
- County: Gryfino
- Gmina: Gryfino

Sobieradz [sɔˈbjɛrat͡s] (German Woltersdorf) is a village in the administrative district of Gmina Gryfino, within Gryfino County, West Pomeranian Voivodeship, in north-western Poland, close to the German border.

== History ==
Until 1945, Woltersdorf was part of the Greifenhagen district in the Stettin district of the Prussian province of Pomerania.

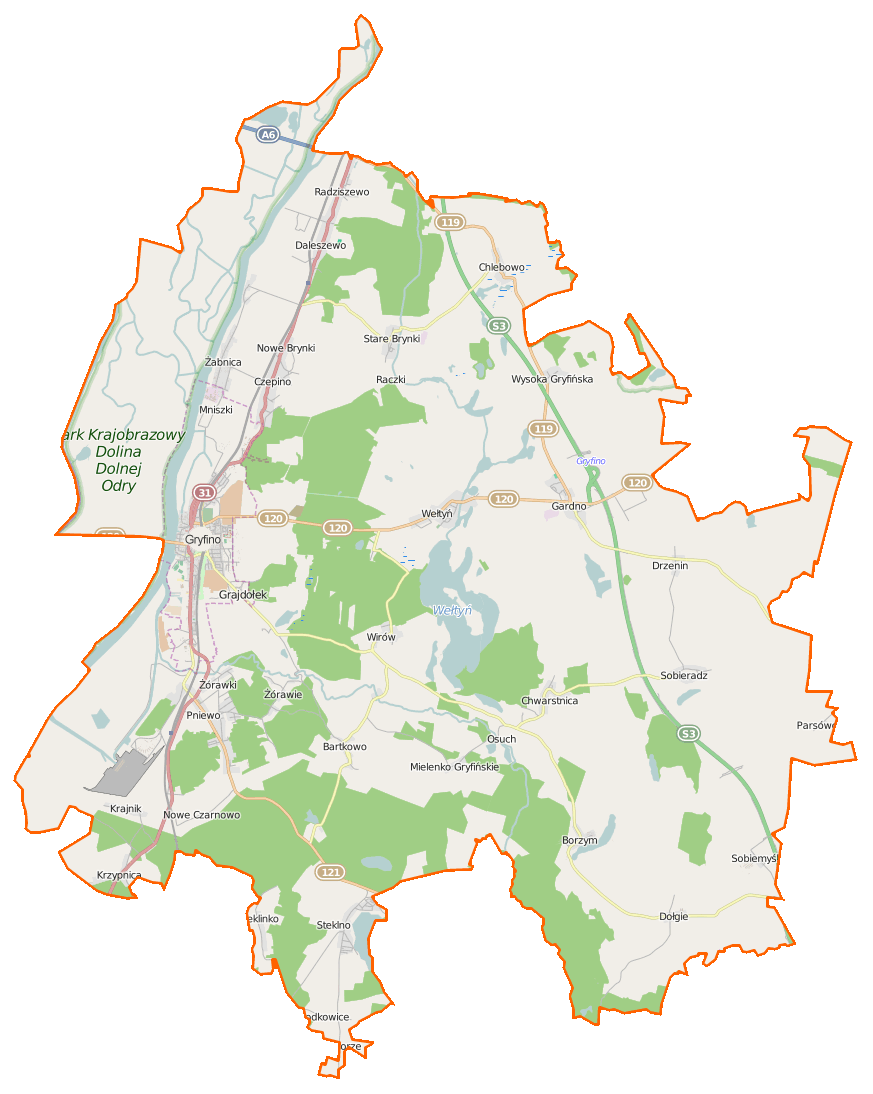
Gryfino (gmina) location map
