= Parsówek =

- Village
- Location within Poland
- Coordinates: 53°12′54″N 14°42′17″E
- Country: Poland
- Voivodeship: West Pomeranian
- County: Gryfino
- Gmina: Gryfino

Parsówek [parˈsuvɛk] is a village in the administrative district of Gmina Gryfino, within Gryfino County, West Pomeranian Voivodeship, in north-western Poland, close to the German border.

For the history of the region, see History of Pomerania.
