= Steklinko =

- Village
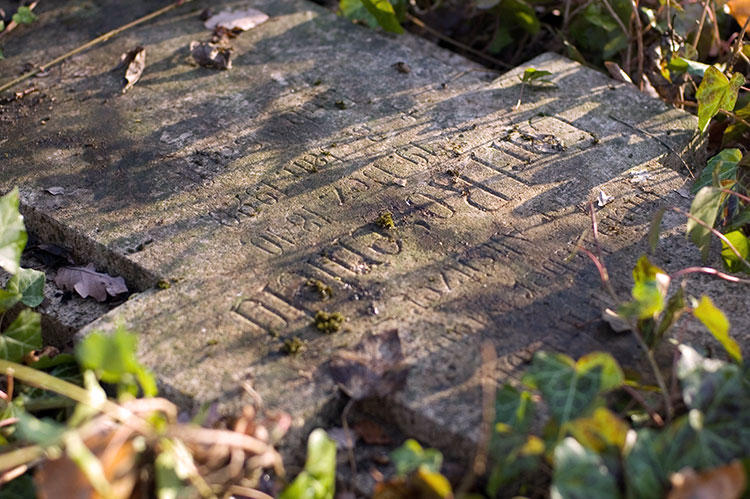

- Location within Poland
- Coordinates: 53°10′43″N 14°30′42″E
- Country: Poland
- Voivodeship: West Pomeranian
- County: Gryfino
- Gmina: Gryfino

Steklinko [stɛˈklinkɔ] (German: Bayershöhe) is a village in the administrative district of Gmina Gryfino, within Gryfino County, West Pomeranian Voivodeship, in north-western Poland, close to the German border.
