= Żórawki =

- Village
- Location within Poland
- Coordinates: 53°13′25″N 14°29′45″E
- Country: Poland
- Voivodeship: West Pomeranian
- County: Gryfino
- Gmina: Gryfino

Żórawki [ʐuˈrafki] (German Kronstein) is a village in the administrative district of Gmina Gryfino, within Gryfino County, West Pomeranian Voivodeship, in north-western Poland, close to the German border.
