= Zaborze, Gryfino County =

Zaborze
- Settlement
- Location within Poland
- Coordinates: 53°09′03″N 14°32′21″E
- Country: Poland
- Voivodeship: West Pomeranian
- County: Gryfino
- Gmina: Gryfino

Zaborze [zaˈbɔʐɛ] (German Schulzendorf) is a settlement in the administrative district of Gmina Gryfino, within Gryfino County, West Pomeranian Voivodeship, in north-western Poland, close to the German border.
