= Włodkowice =

- Village
- Location within Poland
- Coordinates: 53°09′28″N 14°31′21″E
- Country: Poland
- Voivodeship: West Pomeranian
- County: Gryfino
- Gmina: Gryfino

Włodkowice [vwɔtkɔˈvit͡sɛ] (formerly German Wilhelmshöhe) is a village in the administrative district of Gmina Gryfino, within Gryfino County, West Pomeranian Voivodeship, in north-western Poland, close to the German border.

For the history of the region, see History of Pomerania.
