= Będogoszcz =

- Settlement
- Location within Poland
- Coordinates: 53°20′0.26″N 14°45′25.76″E
- Country: Poland
- Voivodeship: West Pomeranian
- County: Gryfino
- Gmina: Stare Czarnowo

Będogoszcz [bɛnˈdɔɡɔʂt͡ʂ] (German: Schützenaue) is a settlement in the administrative district of Gmina Stare Czarnowo, within Gryfino County, West Pomeranian Voivodeship, in north-western Poland.

== See also ==
- History of Pomerania
