= Nowe Brynki =

- Village
- Location within Poland
- Coordinates: 53°17′35″N 14°31′16″E
- Country: Poland
- Voivodeship: West Pomeranian
- County: Gryfino
- Gmina: Gryfino
- Population: 90

Nowe Brynki [ˈnɔvɛ ˈbrɨnki] (German Neu Brünken) is a village in the administrative district of Gmina Gryfino, within Gryfino County, West Pomeranian Voivodeship, in north-western Poland, close to the German border. It lies approximately 6 km (4 mi) north-east of Gryfino and 15 km (9 mi) south of the regional capital Szczecin.

For the history of the region, see History of Pomerania.

The village has a population of 90.
