= Gmina Gryfino =

Gmina Gryfino Gryfino Commune
- Gmina
- Flag Coat of arms

- Location within Poland
- Coordinates (Gryfino): 53°15′N 14°29′E
- Country: Poland
- Voivodeship: West Pomeranian
- County: Gryfino
- Seat: Gryfino

Area
  - Total: 253.62 km^{2} (97.92 sq mi)

Population (2006)
  - Total: 31,284
  - Density: 123.35/km^{2} (319.47/sq mi)
  - Urban: 21,478
  - Rural: 9,806
- Website: https://www.gryfino.pl/

Gmina Gryfino is an urban-rural gmina (administrative district) in Gryfino County, West Pomeranian Voivodeship, in north-western Poland, on the German border. Its seat is the town of Gryfino, which lies approximately 20 kilometres (12 mi) south of the regional capital Szczecin.

The gmina covers an area of 253.62 square kilometres (97.9 sq mi), and as of 2006 its total population is 31,284 (out of which the population of Gryfino amounts to 21,478, and the population of the rural part of the gmina is 9,806).

The gmina contains parts of the protected areas of Szczecin Landscape Park and Lower Odra Valley Landscape Park.

== Villages ==
Apart from the town of Gryfino, Gmina Gryfino contains the villages and settlements of Bartkowo, Borzym, Chlebowo, Chwarstnica, Ciosna, Czepino, Daleszewo, Dębce, Dołgie, Drzenin, Gajki, Gardno, Krajnik, Krzypnica, Łubnica, Mielenko Gryfińskie, Nowe Brynki, Nowe Czarnowo, Osuch, Parsówek, Pastuszka, Pniewo, Raczki, Radziszewo, Skrzynice, Sobiemyśl, Sobieradz, Śremsko, Stare Brynki, Steklinko, Steklno, Szczawno, Wełtyń, Wirów, Wirówek, Włodkowice, Wysoka Gryfińska, Żabnica, Zaborze, Żórawie and Żórawki.

== Neighbouring gminas ==
Gmina Gryfino is bordered by the city of Szczecin and by the gminas of Banie, Bielice, Kołbaskowo, Stare Czarnowo and Widuchowa. It also borders Germany.

== Industry ==
- Dolna Odra Power Station
