= Słupienica =

Location
- Country: Poland
- Voivodeship: West Pomeranian Voivodeship

Słupienica (Ger. Wiesen Bach) is a stream of northwest Poland, a right tributary of the Rudzianka. It flows through the northern part of the Bukowa Primeval Forest in the West Pomeranian Voivodeship.

== Course ==
The stream arises from numerous small springs on the northern slope of the main range of the Bukowe Hills to the east of Kołówko. Approximately 300 m before the estuary into the Rudzianka, there is the Słupieniec erratic boulder on the right bank. Immediately before the mouth, there is a small marshy pool at the eastern end of the Czwójdziński Gate.

A marked green tourist trail leads along the stream.
