= Nieznań =

- Village
- Location within Poland
- Coordinates: 53°18′49″N 14°50′22″E
- Country: Poland
- Voivodeship: West Pomeranian
- County: Gryfino
- Gmina: Stare Czarnowo

Nieznań [ˈɲɛznaɲ] (German: Heidchen) is a village in the administrative district of Gmina Stare Czarnowo, within Gryfino County, West Pomeranian Voivodeship, in north-western Poland.

For the history of the region, see History of Pomerania.
