= Dobropole Gryfińskie =

- Village
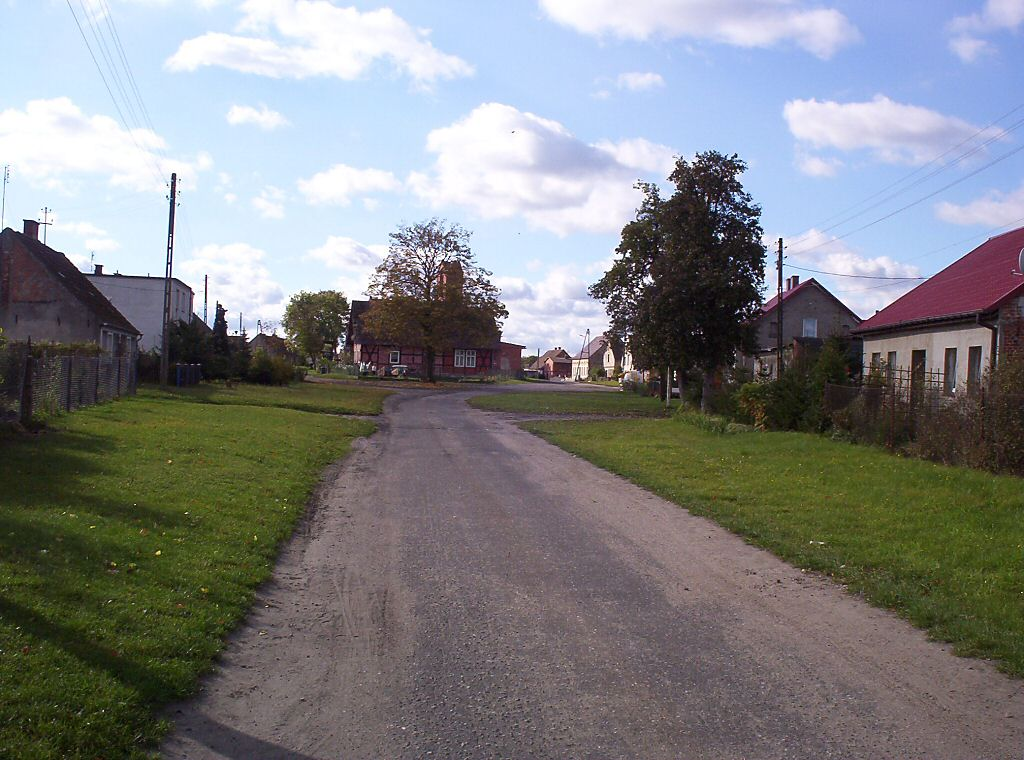

- Location within Poland
- Coordinates: 53°18′07″N 14°44′47″E
- Country: Poland
- Voivodeship: West Pomeranian
- County: Gryfino
- Gmina: Stare Czarnowo

Dobropole Gryfińskie [dɔbrɔˈpɔlɛ ɡrɨˈfiɲskʲɛ] (German: Dobberphul) is a village in the administrative district of Gmina Stare Czarnowo, within Gryfino County, West Pomeranian Voivodeship, in north-western Poland.
