= Gmina Stare Czarnowo =

Gmina Stare Czarnowo Stare Czarnowo Commune
- Gmina
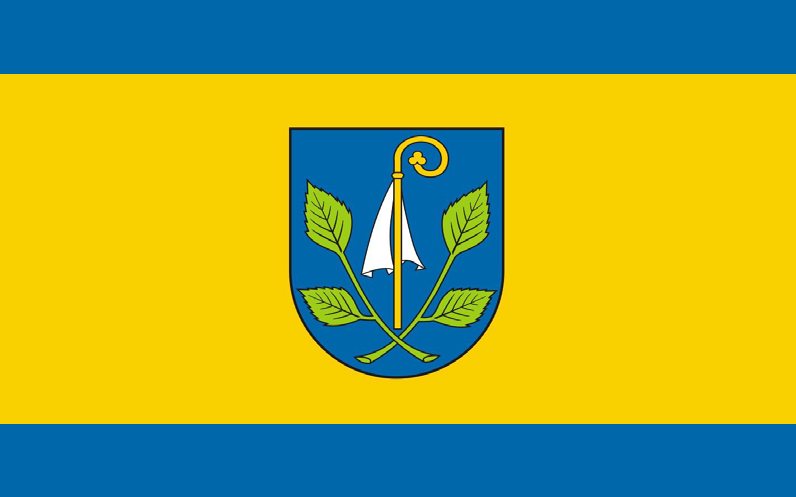
- Flag Coat of arms

- Location within Poland
- Coordinates (Stare Czarnowo): 53°16′54″N 14°46′51″E
- Country: Poland
- Voivodeship: West Pomeranian
- County: Gryfino
- Seat: Stare Czarnowo

Area
  - Total: 153.17 km^{2} (59.14 sq mi)

Population (2006)
  - Total: 3,871
  - Density: 25.27/km^{2} (65.46/sq mi)
- Website: http://www.stareczarnowo.pl/

Gmina Stare Czarnowo is a rural gmina (administrative district) in Gryfino County, West Pomeranian Voivodeship, in north-western Poland. Its seat is the village of Stare Czarnowo, which lies approximately 21 kilometres (13 mi) east of Gryfino and 20 km (12 mi) south-east of the regional capital Szczecin.

The gmina covers an area of 153.17 square kilometres (59.1 sq mi), and as of 2006 its total population is 3,871.

The gmina contains part of the protected area called Szczecin Landscape Park.

At the end of November 2007 the mayor of the city of Szczecin, Piotr Krzystek, presented a proposal to incorporate Stare Czarnowo into Szczecin. Eventually, the proposal was not accepted.

== Villages ==
Gmina Stare Czarnowo contains the villages and settlements of Będogoszcz, Binówko, Binowo, Dębina, Dobropole Gryfińskie, Gliniec, Glinna, Kartno, Kołbacz, Kołówko, Kołowo, Komorówko, Małolesie, Modrzewko, Nieznań, Osetne Pole, Stare Czarnowo, Węglino, Żelewo and Żelisławiec.

== Neighbouring gminas ==
Gmina Stare Czarnowo is bordered by the city of Szczecin and by the gminas of Bielice, Gryfino, Kobylanka, Pyrzyce, Stargard and Warnice.
