= Radziszewo, Gryfino County =

Radziszewo
- Village
- Location within Poland
- Coordinates: 53°19′12″N 14°32′17″E
- Country: Poland
- Voivodeship: West Pomeranian
- County: Gryfino
- Gmina: Gryfino
- Population: 480

Radziszewo [rad͡ʑiˈʂɛvɔ] is a village in the administrative district of Gmina Gryfino, within Gryfino County, West Pomeranian Voivodeship, in north-western Poland, close to the German border.
