= Gardno, Gryfino County =

Gardno
- Village
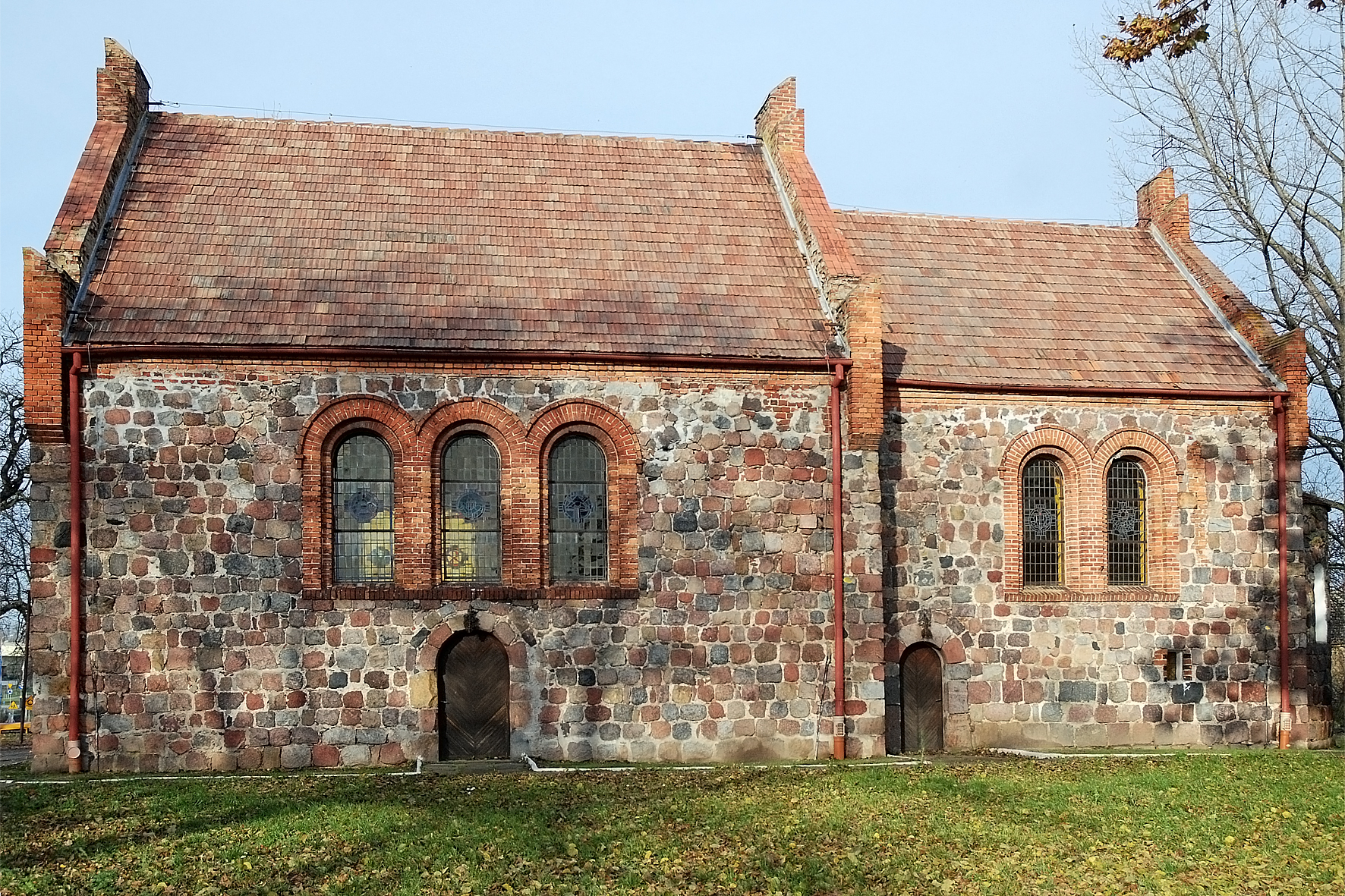
- Church of the Sacred Heart of Jesus

- Location within Poland
- Coordinates: 53°15′36″N 14°37′12″E
- Country: Poland
- Voivodeship: West Pomeranian
- County: Gryfino
- Gmina: Gryfino

Population
  - Total: 1,100

Gardno [ˈɡardnɔ] (German Garden) is a village in the administrative district of Gmina Gryfino, within Gryfino County, West Pomeranian Voivodeship, in north-western Poland, close to the German border. It lies approximately 10 km (6 mi) east of Gryfino and 18 km (11 mi) south of the regional capital Szczecin.

The village has a population of 1,100.

== See also ==
- History of Pomerania
