= Bukowa Woda =

Location
- Country: Poland

Bukowa Woda is a river of Poland and is a tributary of the Lisi Potok.

== See also ==
- List of rivers of Poland
