= Dolna Odra Power Station =

Power plant in Poland

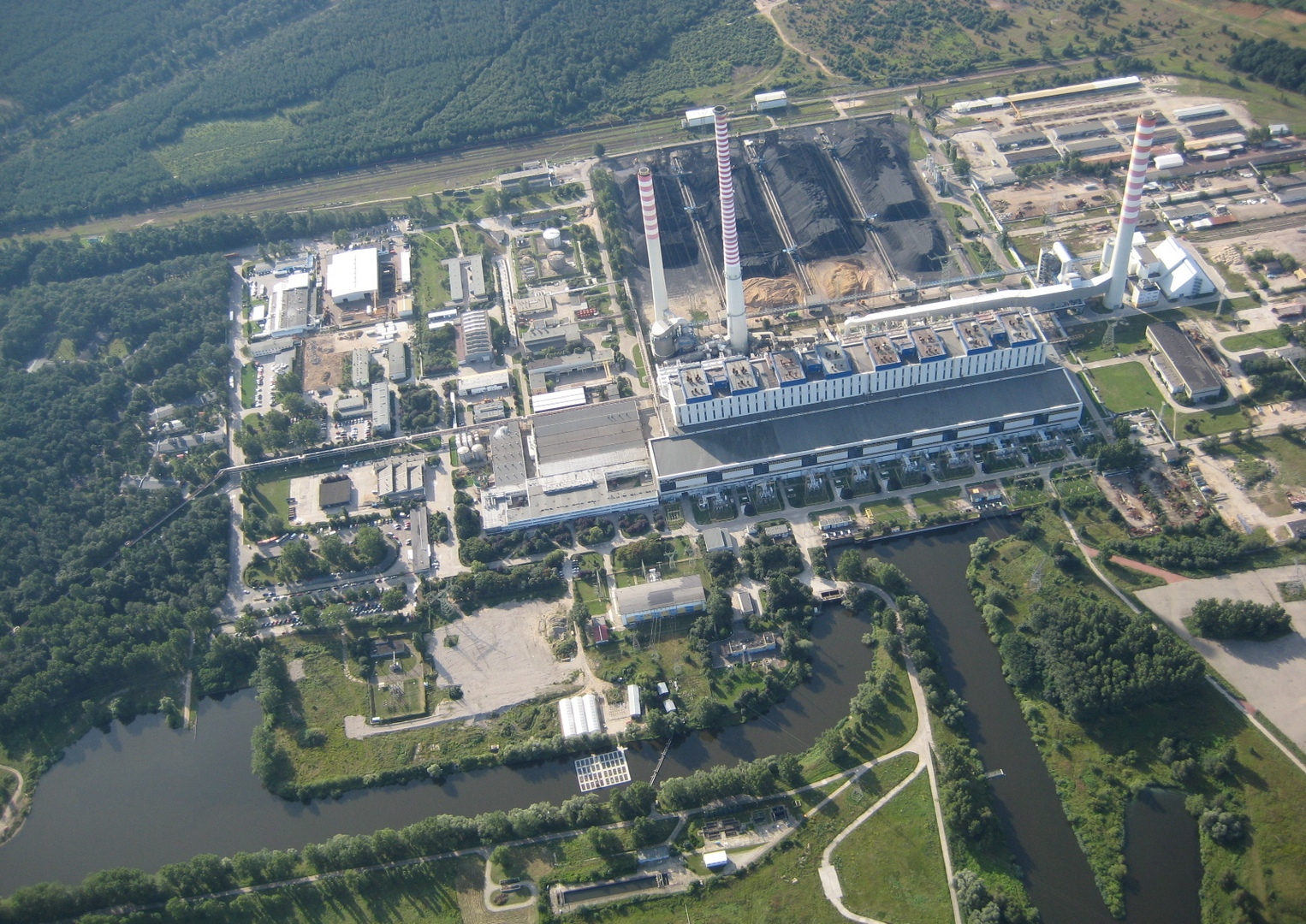
- Official name: Elektrownia Dolna Odra
- Country: Poland
- Location: Nowe Czarnowo, West Pomeranian Voivodeship
- Coordinates: 53°12′28″N 14°28′2″E
- Status: Operational
- Commission date: 1974
- Owner: PGE
- Operator: PGE Zespol Elektrowni Dolna Odra SA

Thermal power station
- Primary fuel: Coal

Power generation
- Units operational: 2 x 220 MW; 6 x 232 MW
- Make and model: Rafako; Zamech; LMZ; Dolmel; Electrosila
- Nameplate capacity: 1,772 MW

External links
- Website: www.zedolnaodra.pgegiek.pl
- Commons: Related media on Commons

Dolna Odra Power Station is a coal-fired power station at Nowe Czarnowo near Gryfino in West Pomeranian Voivodeship, Poland. It consists of 8 units, 2 with 220 MW and 6 with 232 MW, which went in service between 1974 and 5 to 8 were awarded in 1977. Since 1993, Dolna Odra has gone through modernization process. In 2000, units 7 and 8 were equipped by new controls systems from Pavilion Technologies and ABB. Starting from October 2002, the flue gas from the units 5–8 is cleaned at the flue-gas desulfurization plant, built by Lurgi Lentjes. PGE also plans to build two new natural gas-fired units with capacity of 432 MW each.

Dolna Odra Power Station has three flue gas stacks: one with a height of 250 metres (820 ft), one with a height of 200 metres (660 ft), and one with a height of 170 metres (560 ft). A second 250 metres (820 ft) tall flue gas stack was demolished in a non-explosive way after construction of a smoke cleaning facility, which uses the mentioned 200 metres (660 ft) tall stack.

On 24 January 2010, an explosion of coal dust killed one employee and injured three. Part of a plant's coal supply system has been damaged.

== See also ==
- List of power stations in Poland
- List of tallest structures in Poland
