= Stare Czarnowo =

- Village
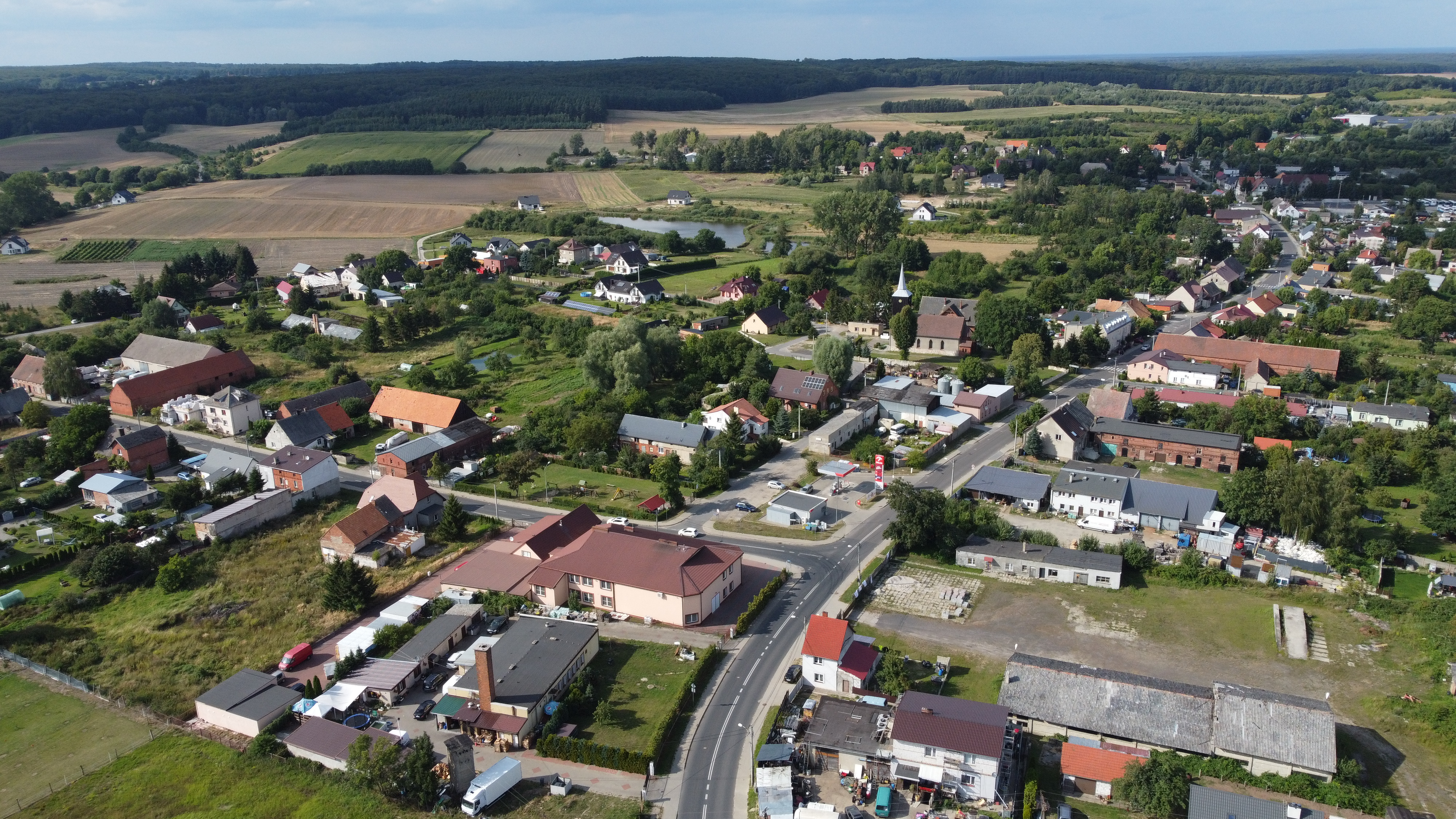
- Aerial view of Stare Czarnowo

- Location within Poland
- Coordinates: 53°16′54″N 14°46′51″E
- Country: Poland
- Voivodeship: West Pomeranian
- County: Gryfino
- Gmina: Stare Czarnowo
- Population (2011): 623
- Time zone: UTC+1 (CET)
  - Summer (DST): UTC+2 (CEST)
- Postal code: 74-106
- Area code: +48 91
- Vehicle registration: ZGR

Stare Czarnowo [ˈstarɛ t͡ʂarˈnɔvɔ] (German: Neumark) is a village in Gryfino County, West Pomeranian Voivodeship, in north-western Poland. It is the seat of the gmina (administrative district) called Gmina Stare Czarnowo. It lies approximately 21 km (13 mi) east of Gryfino and 20 km (12 mi) south-east of the regional capital Szczecin.

Stare Czarnowo's main historic landmark it the Church of Our Lady Help of Christians, which dates back to the 16th century.

The area became part of the emerging Polish state under its first historic ruler Mieszko I around 967. Following the fragmentation of Poland, it formed part of the Duchy of Pomerania. From the 18th century, it formed part of Prussia, and from 1871 to 1945 it was also part of Germany.

== Notable people ==
- Ryszard Dawidowicz (born 1960) a Polish former cyclist. He competed in two events at the 1988 Summer Olympics
