= Gryfino =

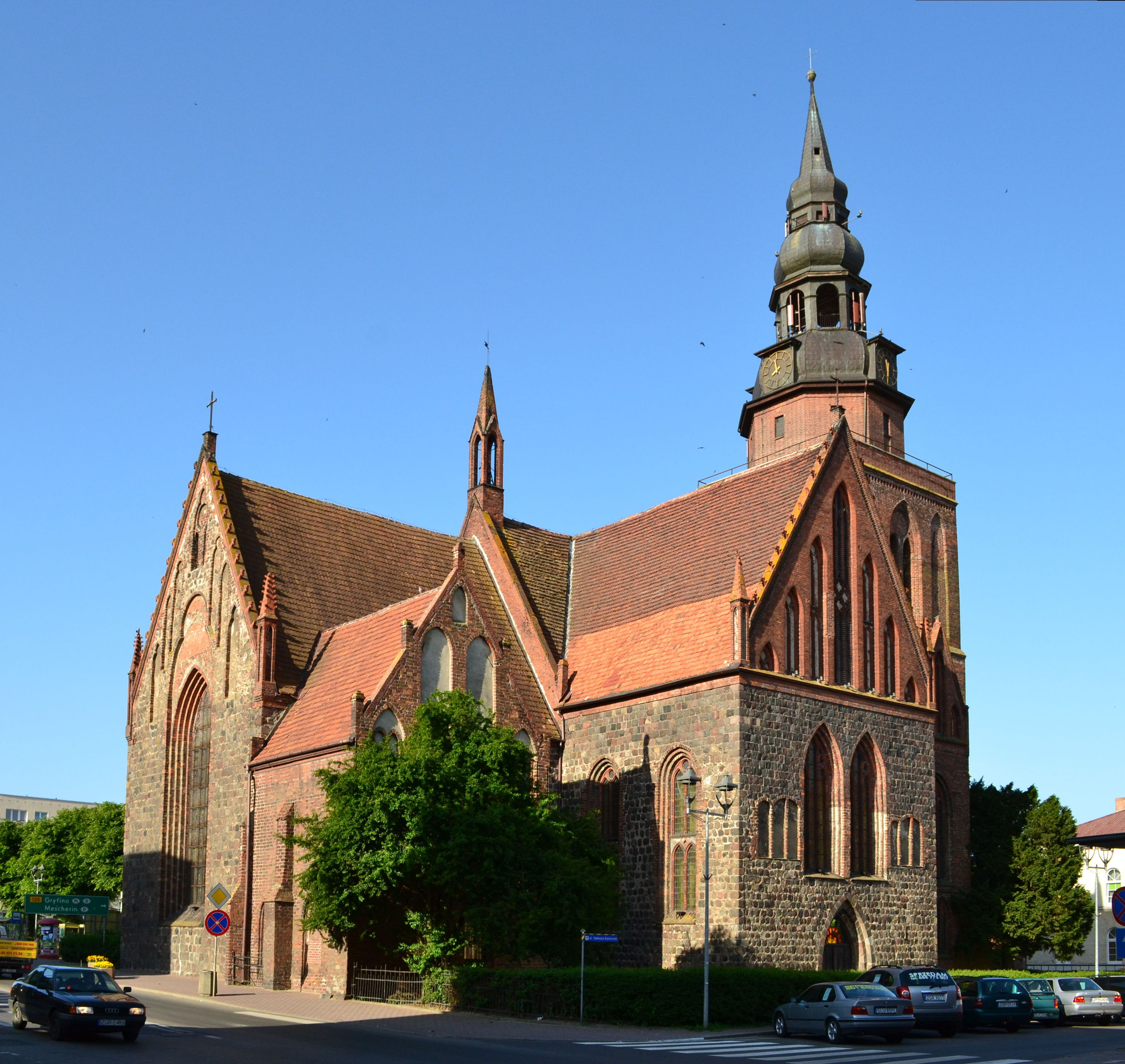
- Church of the Nativity of the Virgin Mary

- Flag Coat of arms

- Location within Poland
- Coordinates: 53°15′11″N 14°29′15″E
- Country: Poland
- Voivodeship: West Pomeranian
- County: Gryfino
- Gmina: Gryfino
- Town rights: 1254

Government
  - Mayor: Mieczysław Sawaryn

Area
  - Total: 9.58 km^{2} (3.70 sq mi)

Population (2017)
  - Total: 21,393
  - Density: 2,230/km^{2} (5,780/sq mi)
- Time zone: UTC+1 (CET)
  - Summer (DST): UTC+2 (CEST)
- Postal code: 74-100
- Car plates: ZGR
- Website: www.gryfino.pl

Gryfino [ɡrɨˈfʲinɔ] (German: Greifenhagen) is a town in Pomerania, northwestern Poland, with 21,393 inhabitants (2017). It is the capital of Gryfino County in West Pomeranian Voivodeship.

The town is located on the Odra Wschodnia, the eastern branch of the Oder river, about 20 kilometres (12 miles) south of Szczecin in Poland. The western branch of the Oder, 2 km (1 mi) away from the town center, marks the border with Germany. There is a direct road link between Gryfino and the German town of Mescherin across the river.

The Crooked Forest is located in the village of Nowe Czarnowo, just outside Gryfino.

== History ==
The territory became part of the emerging Polish state under Mieszko I around 967. Following the fragmentation of Poland into smaller duchies it formed part of the Duchy of Pomerania. There are archaeological traces of Slavic settlement dating back to the 12th century.

The settlement was built in 1230 when the area was part of the Duchy of Pomerania-Stettin in the Holy Roman Empire. It was granted Magdeburg town rights by Duke Barnim I under the name Greifenhagen in 1254. In 1271 Barnim I granted guild privileges modelled after Szczecin. In 1281 the town was exempted from customs duties and declared a free port. In 1284 it obtained a permission to build defensive walls and was one of the Pomeranian towns that guaranteed a peace treaty between the Duchy of Pomerania and the Margraviate of Brandenburg. Greifenhagen was in conflict with the town of Gartz across the Oder (current twin town), which was resolved in 1304. In 1306 Duke Otto I allowed the town to build a bridge and a dam over the Oder and collect customs duties on it like Stettin (Szczecin).

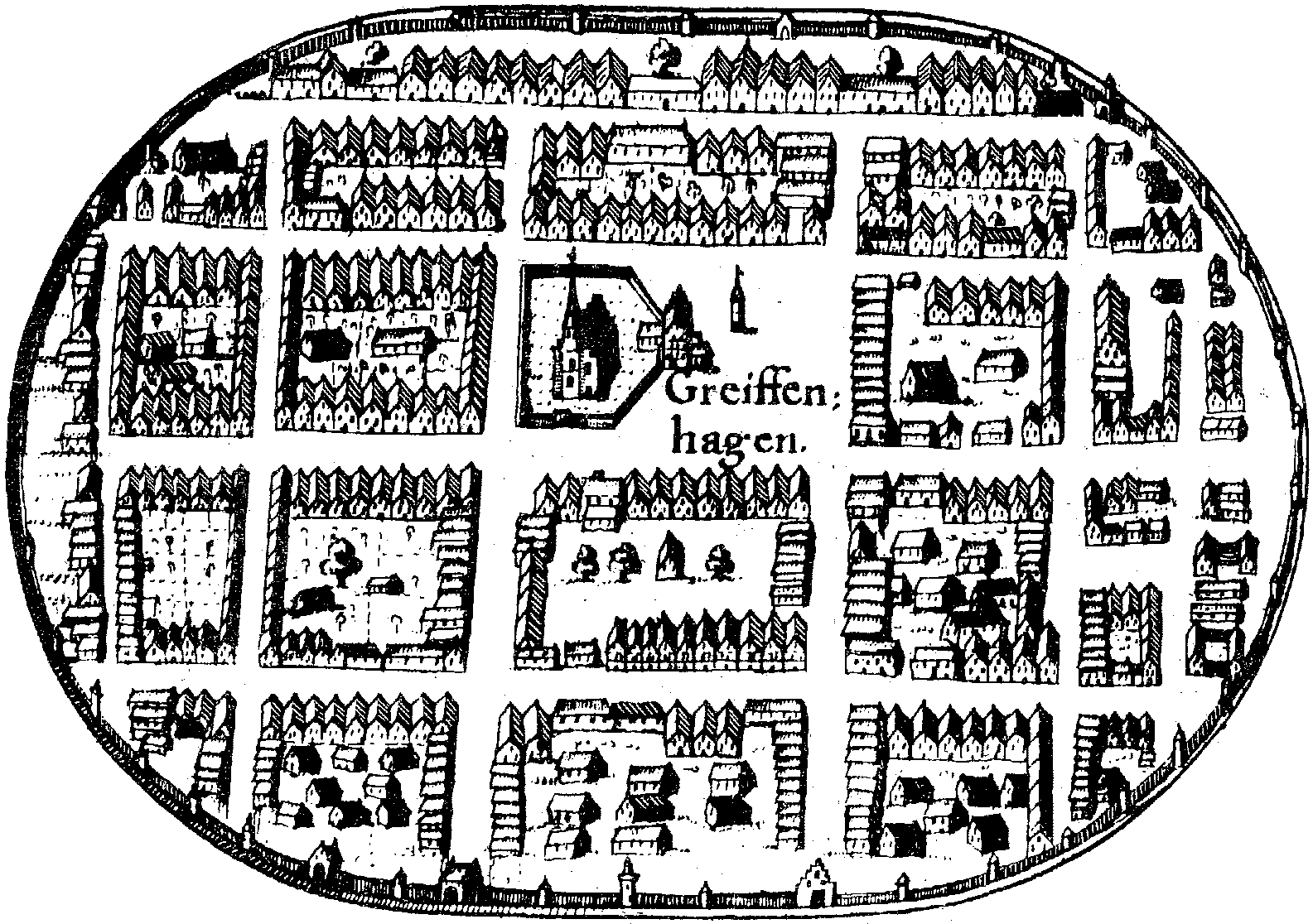
Map of Greifenhagen in 1618 by Eilhard Lubinus

In the Thirty Years' War, the town was hit by epidemics in 1625 and 1638, and was occupied by the Holy Roman Empire in 1627–1630 and by Sweden in 1630–1640. After the war, it remained in Swedish possession. In 1675 it was captured by the Brandenburg-Prussia, into whose possession it came finally in 1679. In 1709 Polish King Stanisław Leszczyński stopped in the town. In 1723, French Huguenots settled in Greifenhagen. During the Seven Years' War, the town was plundered by the Russians. Following the unification of Germany in 1871, Greifenhagen became part of the German Empire. In 1877 it was connected to the railroad and in 1914 the Berlin-Stettin shipping route was opened allowing Greifenhagen's economy to expand.

Two labour camps of the Reich Labour Service were located in the town under Nazi Germany. In the final months of World War II, in March 1945, it was captured by Soviet and Polish forces. During the conquest the town center was heavily destroyed. Afterwards, the region became again part of Poland, although with a Soviet-installed communist regime, which stayed in power until the Fall of Communism in the 1980s. The remaining German population was expelled in accordance with the Potsdam Agreement and gradually replaced by Polish settlers. Despite the existence of the old Polish name Gryfów, the town was first renamed to Gryfin, and in 1946 to Gryfino by replacing the German suffix -hagen by the Polish suffix -ino. A local unit of the Freedom and Independence Association Polish anti-communist resistance organization operated in Gryfino, before it was crushed by the communists in May 1946.

After the war, the town's life was reestablished, in 1945 the first schools began teaching, in 1946 the Gryf cinema was opened, and in 1947 the municipal library was opened. A new hospital and culture center were opened in 1955 and 1958, respectively. From 1975 to 1998 Gryfino was administratively located in the Szczecin Voivodeship. Underground anti-communist press was published in Gryfino from 1982 to 1984. In 2021, a mural to Polish resistance hero Witold Pilecki was unveiled in Gryfino.

In 1974 the first unit of Dolna Odra Power Station, a large coal-fired power station, went in service.

== Demographics ==
Historical population

Year	Pop.	±%
1724	1,807	—
1748	2,153	+19.1%
1794	2,627	+22.0%
1816	3,569	+35.9%
1843	5,187	+45.3%
1871	6,611	+27.5%
1880	6,906	+4.5%

Year	Pop.	±%
1890	6,692	−3.1%
1900	6,473	−3.3%
1910	7,769	+20.0%
1925	8,227	+5.9%
1939	9,858	+19.8%
1950	3,401	−65.5%
1960	5,354	+57.4%

Year	Pop.	±%
1970	7,400	+38.2%
1975	10,800	+45.9%
1980	15,300	+41.7%
1990	21,000	+37.3%
1995	22,100	+5.2%
2004	22,500	+1.8%

Source: verwaltungsgeschichte.de

== Sports ==
The main local sports team are handball team KPR Gryfino, which competes in the I liga (as of 2023–24), and football team Energetyk Gryfino, which competes in the lower divisions. There are also various youth clubs dedicated to athletics, gymnastics, swimming, chess, etc.

== Transport ==
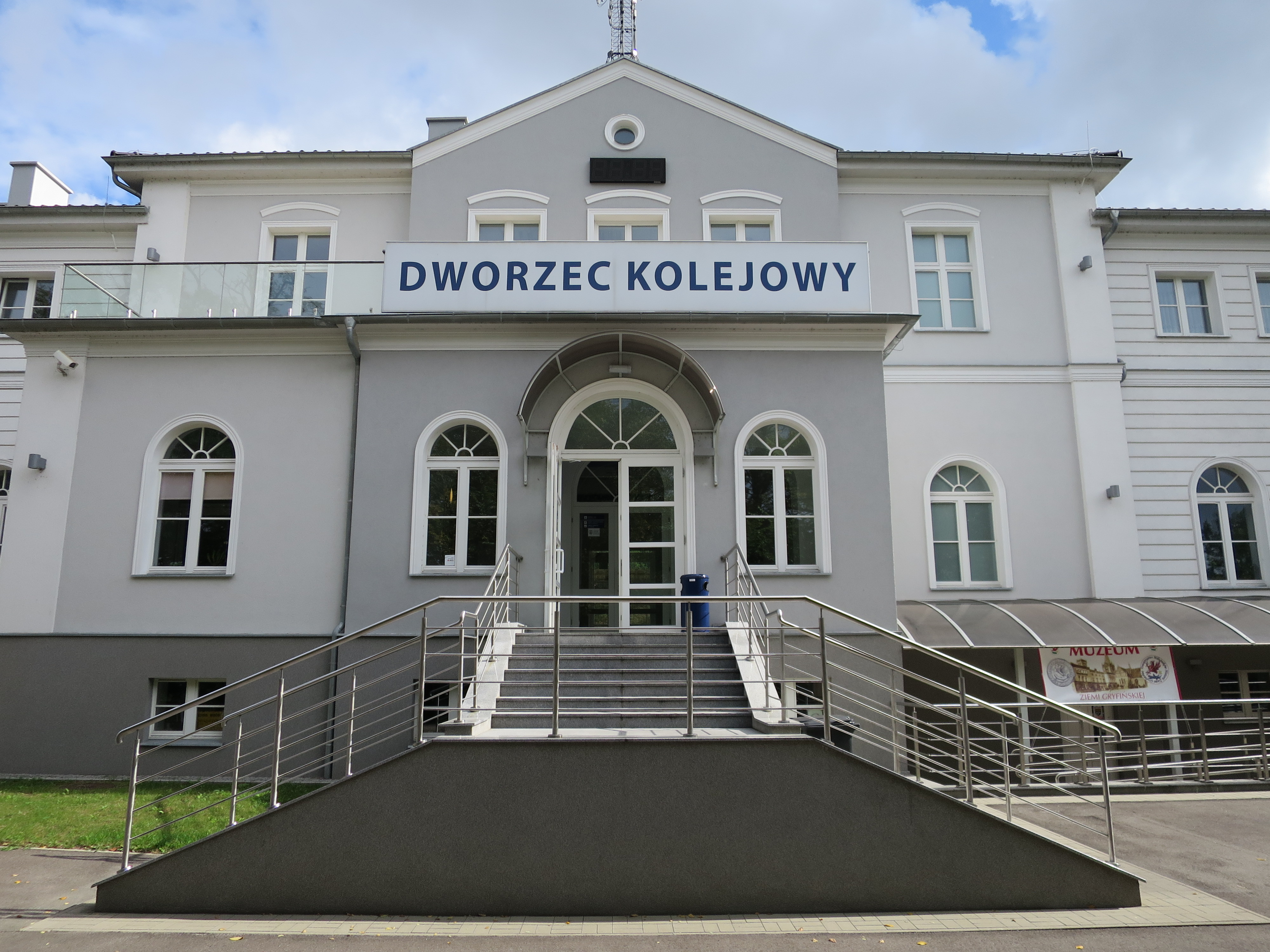
Gryfino train station

There is a railway station in the town, located on the significant Wrocław–Szczecin railway.

== International relations ==
Gryfino is twinned with:

- Barlinek, Poland
- Bersenbrück, Germany
- Gartz, Germany
- Raciechowice, Poland
- Schwedt, Germany

== Towns near Gryfino ==
- Szczecin (Poland)
- Stargard (Poland)
- Cedynia (Poland)
- Chojna (Poland)
- Mieszkowice (Poland)
- Moryń (Poland)
- Trzcińsko-Zdrój (Poland)
- Myślibórz (Poland)
- Pyrzyce (Poland)
- Schwedt (Germany)
- Vierraden (Germany)
- Gartz (Germany)
- Penkun (Germany)

== Gallery ==
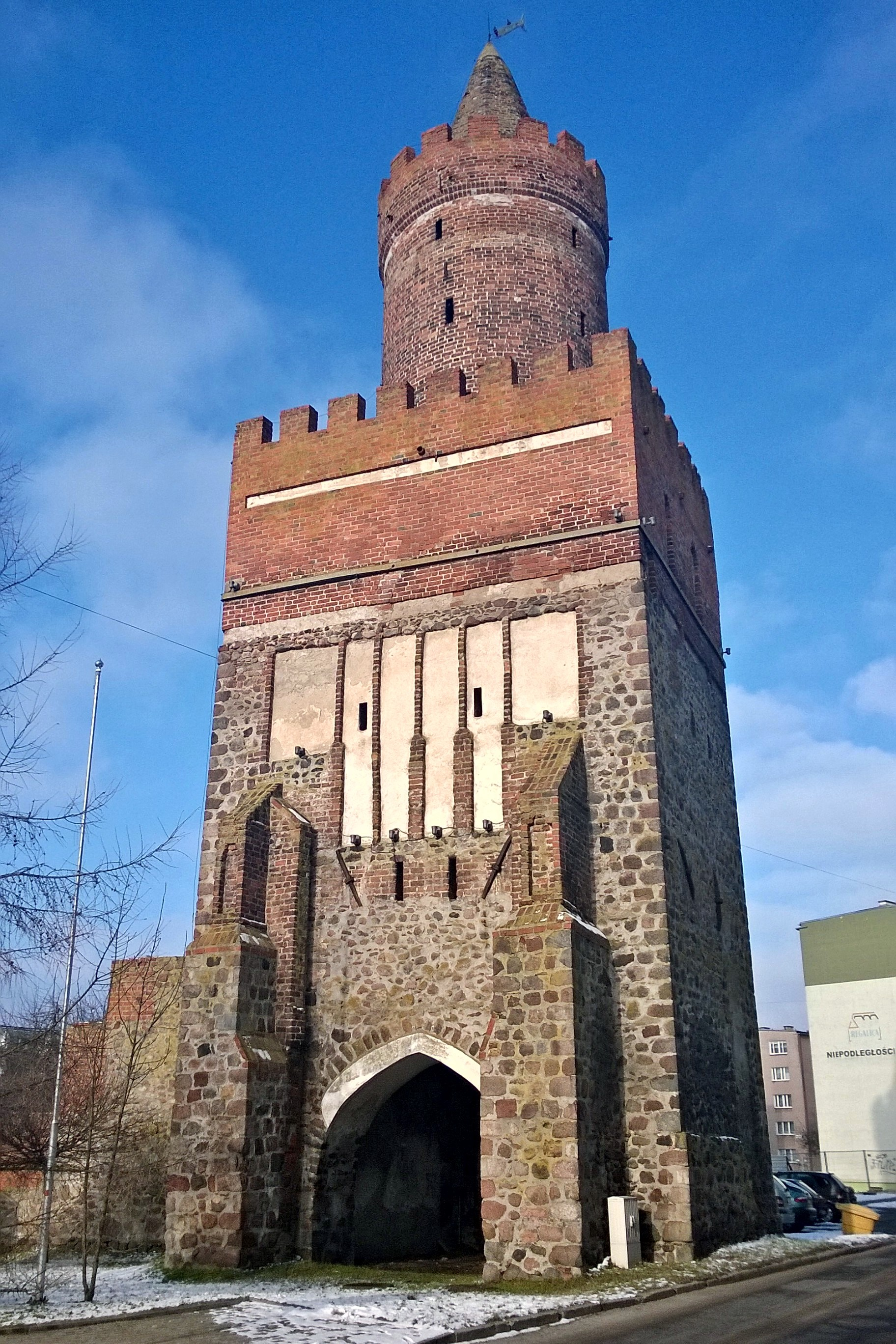
Bańska Gate

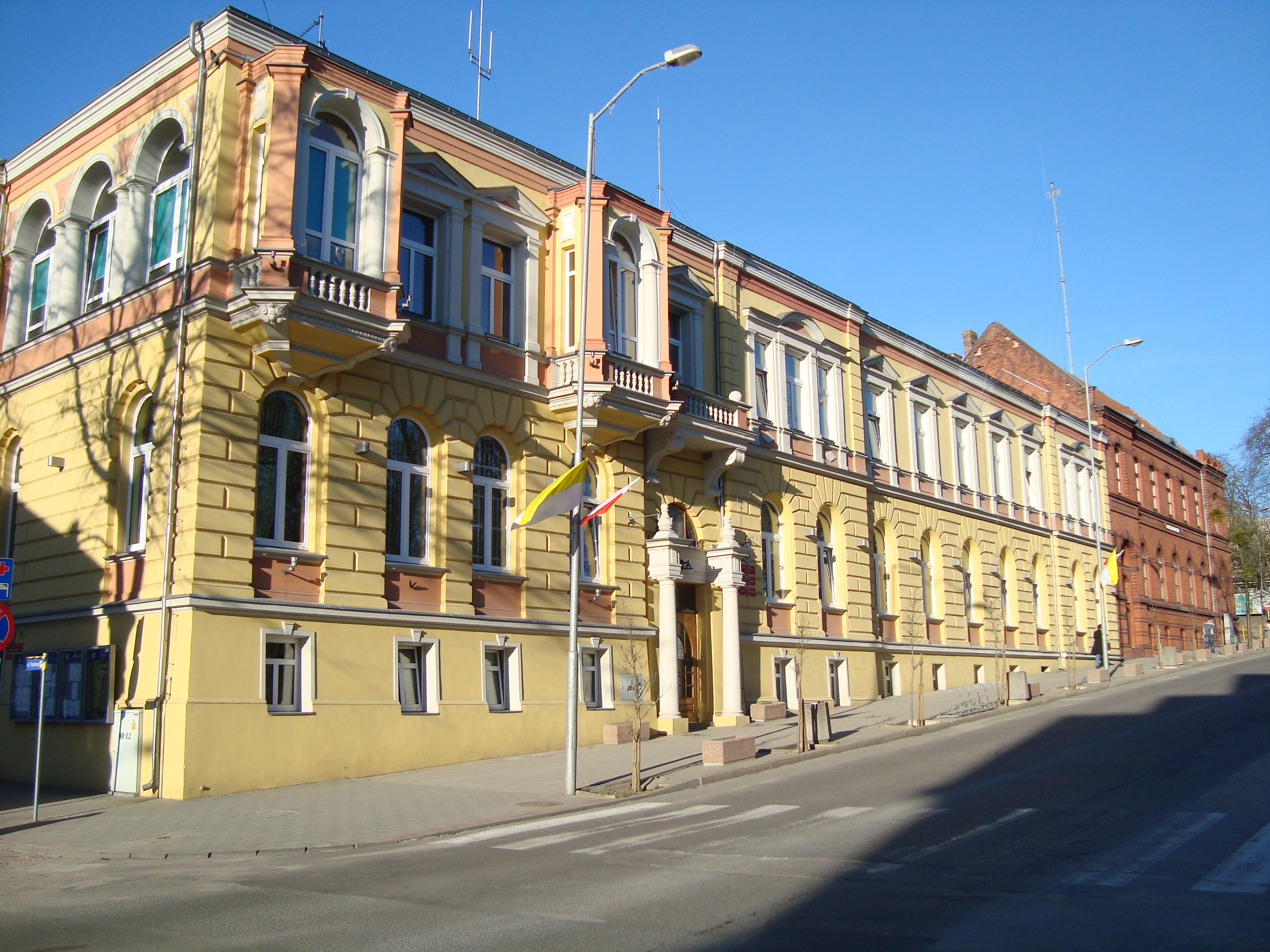
Town hall

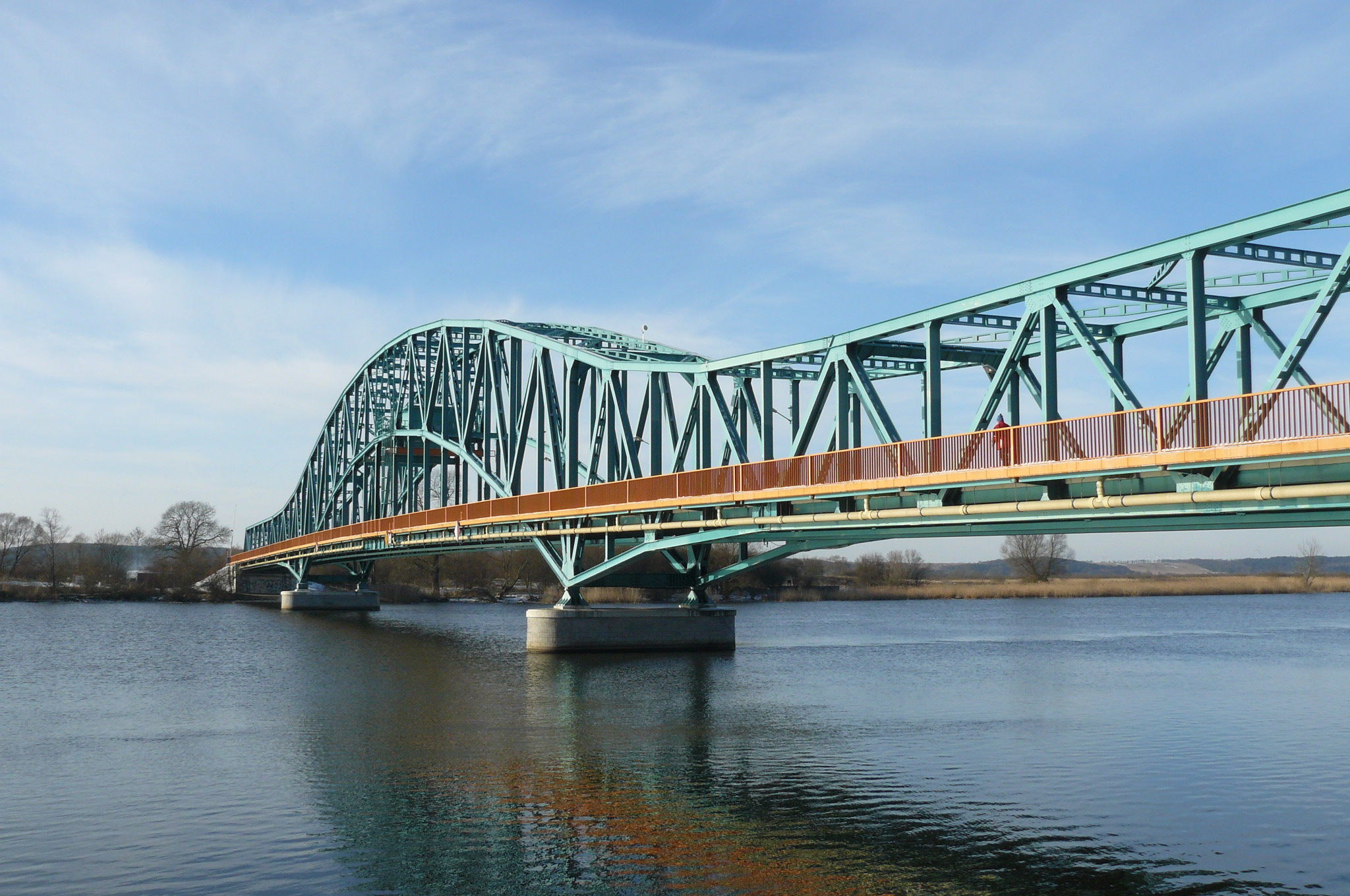
A bridge on the Oder River in Gryfino

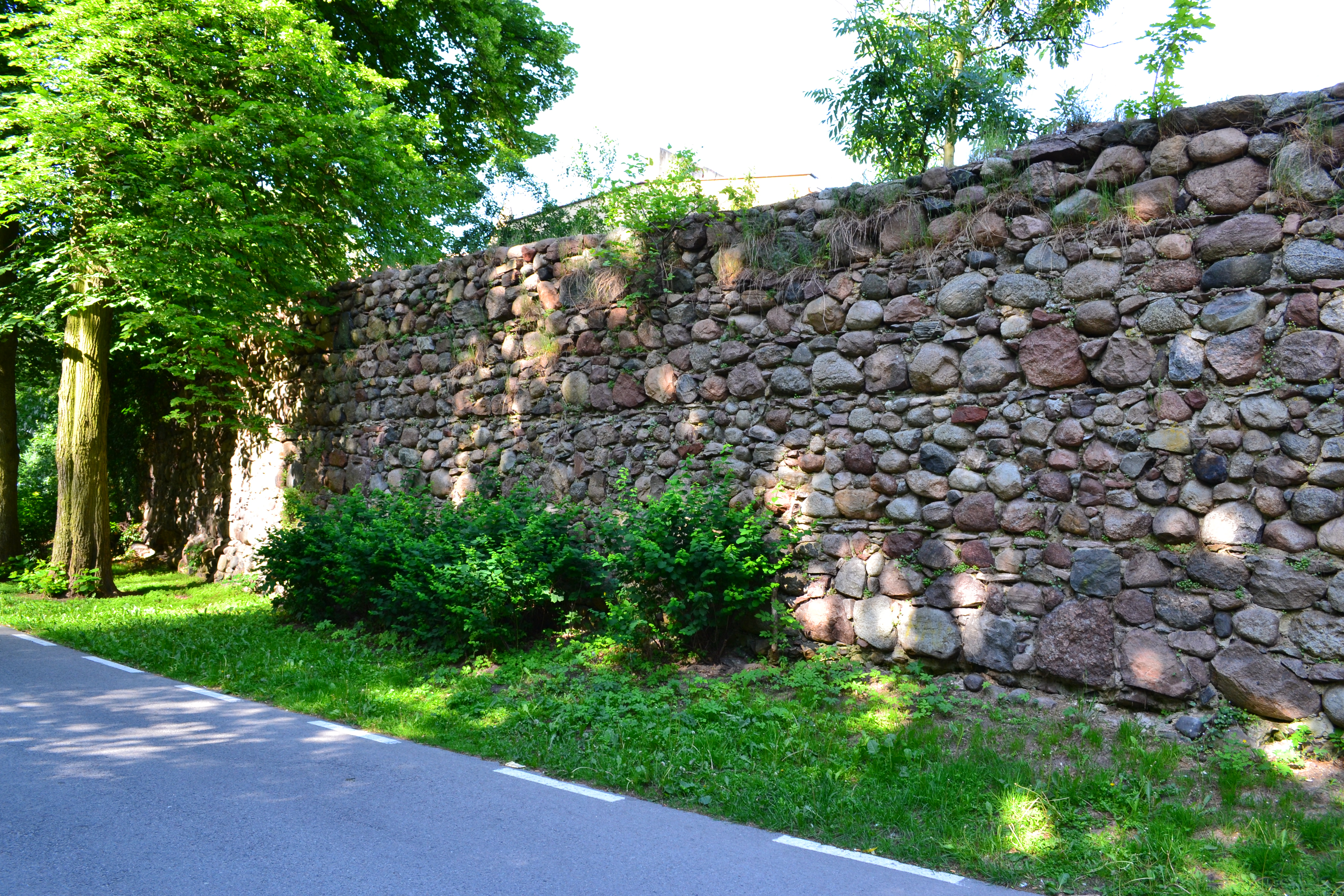
Medieval defensive walls

== Notable people ==
- Manfred Hinze (born 1933), German athlete
- Michał Bieniek (born 1984), Polish former athlete who specialized in the high jump. He competed at the 2008 Summer Olympics

== See also ==
- Crooked Forest, a nearby forest
