= Gryfino County =

Gryfino County Powiat gryfiński
- County
- Flag Coat of arms

- Location within the voivodeship

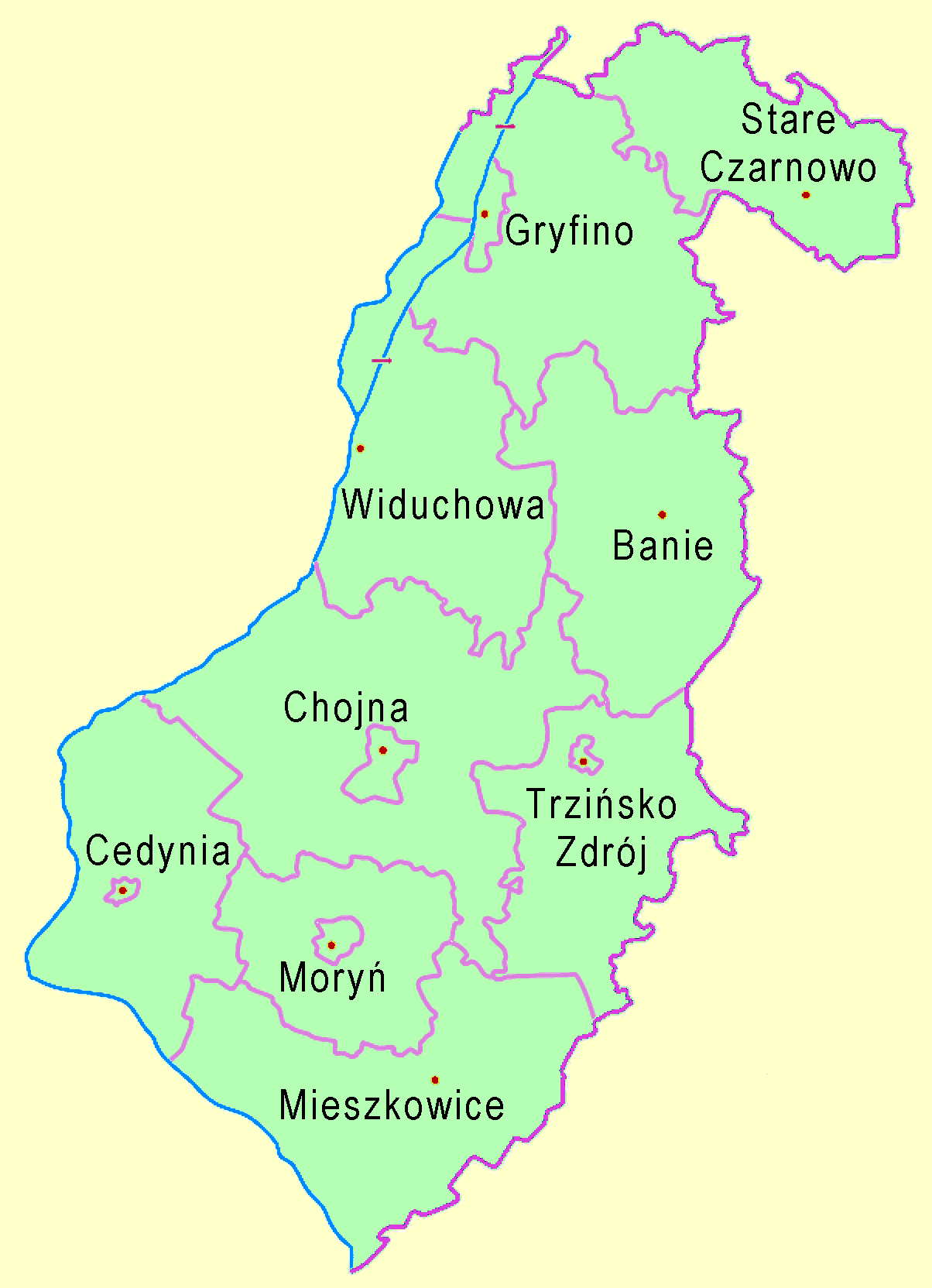
- Division into gminas
- Coordinates (Gryfino): 53°15′N 14°29′E
- Country: Poland
- Voivodeship: West Pomeranian
- Seat: Gryfino
- Gminas: Total 9: Gmina Banie; Gmina Cedynia; Gmina Chojna; Gmina Gryfino; Gmina Mieszkowice; Gmina Moryń; Gmina Stare Czarnowo; Gmina Trzcińsko-Zdrój; Gmina Widuchowa

Area
  - Total: 1,869.54 km^{2} (721.83 sq mi)

Population (2006)
  - Total: 82,813
  - Density: 44.296/km^{2} (114.73/sq mi)
  - Urban: 37,937
  - Rural: 44,876
- Car plates: ZGR
- Website: www.gryfino.powiat.pl

Gryfino County (Polish: powiat gryfiński) is a unit of territorial administration and local government (powiat) in West Pomeranian Voivodeship, north-western Poland, on the German border. It came into being on January 1, 1999, as a result of the Polish local government reforms passed in 1998. Its administrative seat and largest town is Gryfino, which lies 20 kilometres (12 mi) south of the regional capital Szczecin. The county contains five other towns: Chojna, 32 km (20 mi) south of Gryfino, Mieszkowice, 52 km (32 mi) south of Gryfino, Trzcińsko-Zdrój, 33 km (21 mi) south of Gryfino, Cedynia, 45 km (28 mi) south-west of Gryfino, and Moryń, 44 km (27 mi) south of Gryfino.

The county covers an area of 1,869.54 square kilometres (721.8 sq mi). As of 2006 its total population is 82,813, out of which the population of Gryfino is 21,478, that of Chojna is 7,187, that of Mieszkowice is 3,553, that of Trzcińsko-Zdrój is 2,496, that of Cedynia is 1,653, that of Moryń is 1,570, and the rural population is 44,876.

== Neighbouring counties ==
Gryfino County is bordered by Police County and the city of Szczecin to the north, Stargard County and Pyrzyce County to the east, and Myślibórz County to the south-east. It also borders Germany to the west.

== Administrative divisions ==
The county is subdivided into nine gminas (six urban-rural and three rural). These are listed in the following table, in descending order of population.

Gmina	Type	Area (km^{2})	Population (2006)	Seat
Gmina Gryfino	urban-rural	253.6	31,284	Gryfino
Gmina Chojna	urban-rural	332.9	13,960	Chojna
Gmina Mieszkowice	urban-rural	238.7	7,457	Mieszkowice
Gmina Banie	rural	205.8	6,350	Banie
Gmina Trzcińsko-Zdrój	urban-rural	170.5	5,690	Trzcińsko-Zdrój
Gmina Widuchowa	rural	209.6	5,562	Widuchowa
Gmina Cedynia	urban-rural	180.4	4,343	Cedynia
Gmina Moryń	urban-rural	124.9	4,296	Moryń
Gmina Stare Czarnowo	rural	153.2	3,871	Stare Czarnowo
