= Jamno =

Jamno may refer to:

- Jamno (lake), close to the Baltic Sea in West Pomeranian Voivodeship (north-west Poland)
- Jamno, Gryfino County in West Pomeranian Voivodeship (north-west Poland)
- Jamno, Koszalin County in West Pomeranian Voivodeship (north-west Poland)
- Jamno, Łowicz County in Łódź Voivodeship (central Poland)
- Jamno, Zduńska Wola County in Łódź Voivodeship (central Poland)
- Jamno, Świętokrzyskie Voivodeship (south-central Poland)
- Jamno, Masovian Voivodeship (east-central Poland)
- Jamno, Silesian Voivodeship (south Poland)
- Jamno, Sulęcin County in Lubusz Voivodeship (west Poland)
- Jamno, Pomeranian Voivodeship (north Poland)
- Jamno, Żary County in Lubusz Voivodeship (west Poland)
- Jamno, Croatia, a village near Bednja, Varaždin County
