= Goszków =

- Village
- Location within Poland
- Coordinates: 52°51′N 14°30′E
- Country: Poland
- Voivodeship: West Pomeranian
- County: Gryfino
- Gmina: Mieszkowice
- Elevation: 59 m (194 ft)
- Population: 234

Goszków [ˈɡɔʂkuf] (formerly German Gossow) is a village in the administrative district of Gmina Mieszkowice, within Gryfino County, West Pomeranian Voivodeship, in north-western Poland, close to the German border. It lies approximately 8 km (5 mi) north of Mieszkowice, 45 km (28 mi) south of Gryfino, and 64 km (40 mi) south of the regional capital Szczecin.

For the history of the region, see History of Pomerania.

The village has a population of 234.

== People ==
- Albert von Levetzow (1827-1903), Prussian politician, president of the German Reichstag
