= Sitno, Gryfino County =

Sitno
- Village
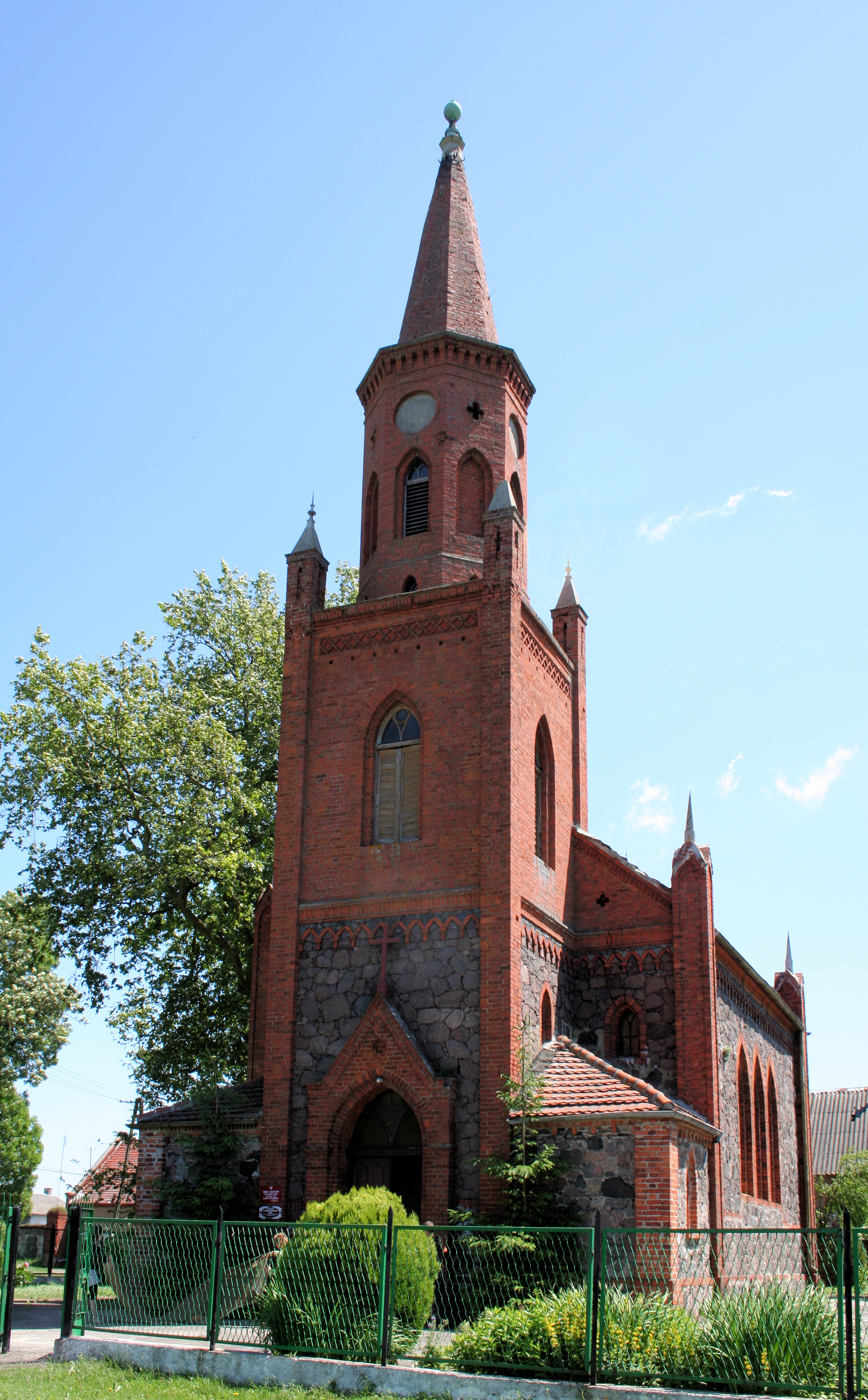
- Church of the Holiest Saviour

- Location within Poland
- Coordinates: 52°45′25″N 14°32′43″E
- Country: Poland
- Voivodeship: West Pomeranian
- County: Gryfino
- Gmina: Mieszkowice
- Population: 210

Sitno [ˈɕitnɔ] (formerly German Schönfeld) is a village in the administrative district of Gmina Mieszkowice, within Gryfino County, West Pomeranian Voivodeship, in north-western Poland, close to the German border. It lies approximately 6 km (4 mi) south-east of Mieszkowice, 55 km (34 mi) south of Gryfino, and 74 km (46 mi) south of the regional capital Szczecin.

For the history of the region, see History of Pomerania.

The village has a population of 210.
