= Gozdowice =

- Village
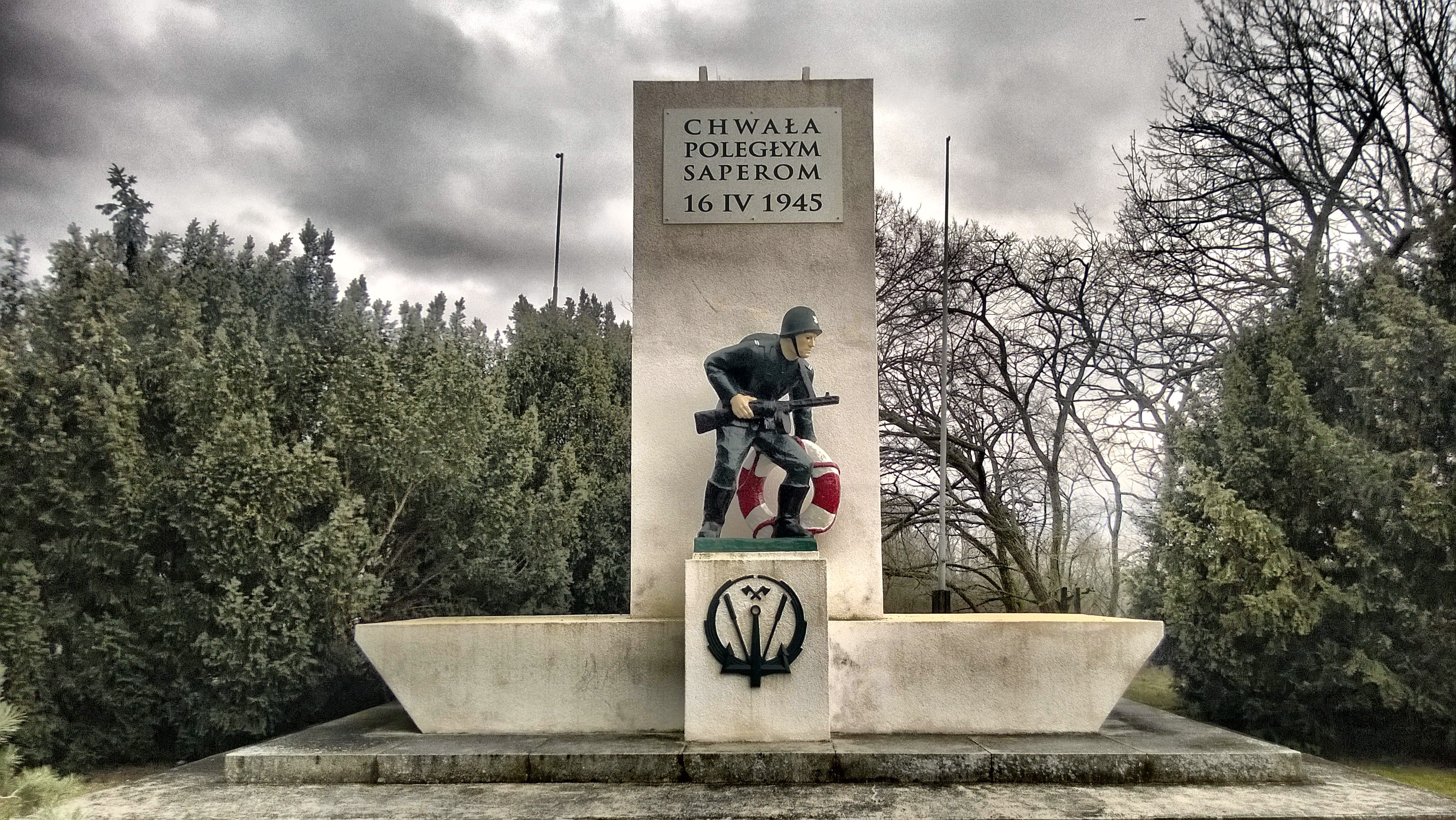
- Monument to Polish sappers

- Location within Poland
- Coordinates: 52°45′52″N 14°19′30″E
- Country: Poland
- Voivodeship: West Pomeranian
- County: Gryfino
- Gmina: Mieszkowice
- Population: 123
- Time zone: UTC+1 (CET)
  - Summer (DST): UTC+2 (CEST)
- Website: http://www.gozdowice.pl

Gozdowice [ɡɔzdɔˈvit͡sɛ] (German: Güstebiese) is a village in the administrative district of Gmina Mieszkowice, within Gryfino County, West Pomeranian Voivodeship, in north-western Poland, close to the German border. It lies approximately 11 km (7 mi) west of Mieszkowice, 55 km (34 mi) south of Gryfino, and 75 km (47 mi) south of the regional capital Szczecin.

The sights of Gozdowice include the Museum of Memorabilia of the Engineering Forces of the First Polish Army (Muzeum Pamiątek Wojsk Inżynieryjnych 1 Armii Wojska Polskiego), a monument commemorating Polish sappers who died during World War II in 1945, an observation tower and the Immaculate Conception church, which dates back to the 13th century.

From the High Middle Ages the region was part of the Kingdom of Poland, Margraviate of Brandenburg, Czech Kingdom, Teutonic Order, Brandenburg again, Prussia and united Germany from 1871 to 1945, before becoming again part of Poland after the defeat of Nazi Germany in World War II.

The village has a population of 123 and lies on the Odra River.
