= Czelin =

- Village
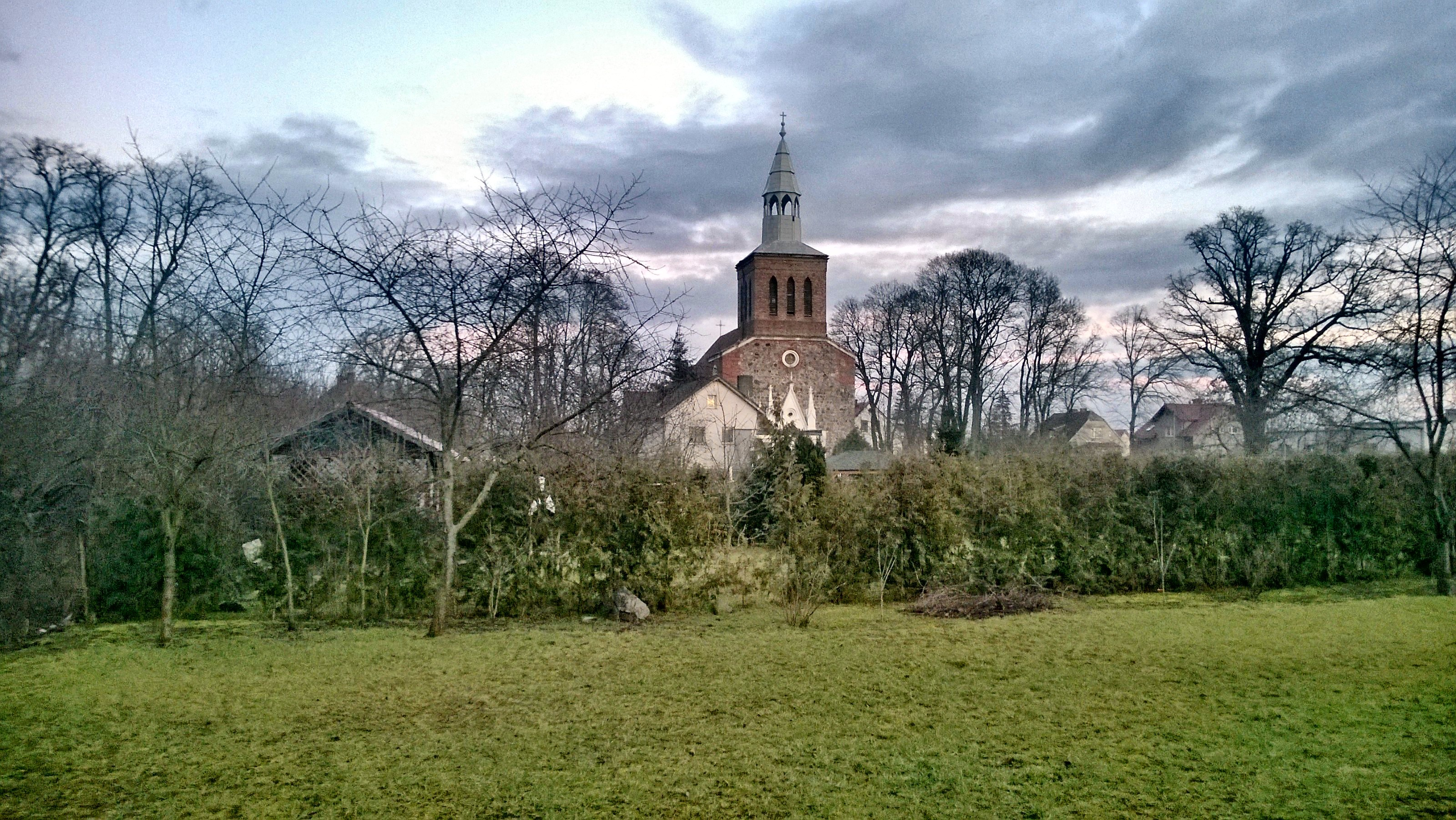
- Czelin with the Our Lady of Częstochowa church

- Location within Poland
- Coordinates: 52°44′N 14°23′E
- Country: Poland
- Voivodeship: West Pomeranian
- County: Gryfino
- Gmina: Mieszkowice

Government
  - Sołtys: Wiesława Henk
- Area: 32.64 km^{2} (12.60 sq mi)
- Elevation: 11 m (36 ft)
- Population (2021): 357
  - Density: 10.9/km^{2} (28.3/sq mi)
- Time zone: UTC+1 (CET)
  - Summer (DST): UTC+2 (CEST)

Czelin [ˈt͡ʂɛlin] (German: Zellin) is a village in the Gmina Mieszkowice, within Gryfino County, West Pomeranian Voivodeship, in north-western Poland, close to the German border. It is particularly notable for being the sight of the first western Polish border marker after World War II, now the sight of a memorial park with an obelisk.

== Geography ==
Czelin is its own sołectwo, with an area of 32.64 km^{2} (13 sq mi), in the Gmina Mieszkowice. Besides Czelin itself, the sołectwo also includes the settlement of Rogaczewo. The village lies approximately 9 km (6 mi) south-west of Mieszkowice, 58 km (36 mi) south of Gryfino, and 77 km (48 mi) south of the regional capital Szczecin.

Situated in the grass- and farmlands on the right shore of the Oder river, Czelin lies between two forests – the Mieszkowice Forests (Polish: Lasy Mieszkowickie, formerly German: Forst Alt Lietzegöricke) roughly 1.5 km (1 mi) to the north, of which a small treeline expands riversides down to the settlement itself, and the Namyślin Forest District (Polish: Leśnictwa Namyślin, formerly German: Forst Neumühl) about 4 km (2 mi) to the south-east. Czelin is located within the Cedynia Landscape Park, of which it represents the southernmost point. Both to the south and to the north of the settlement are wetlands situated along the Oder.

The village is connected to the outside by two paved tertiary roads and several smaller unpaved roads.

== History ==
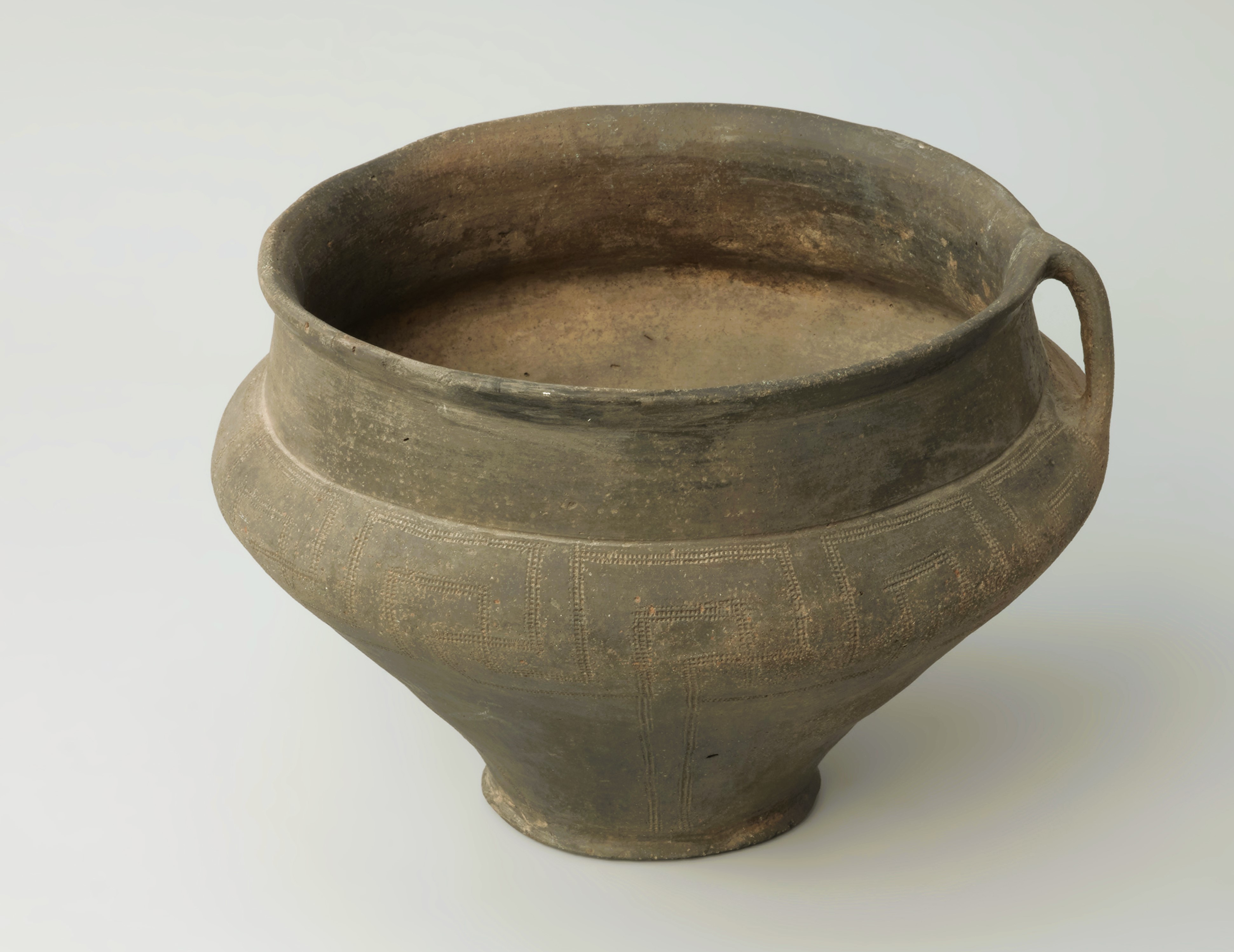
Vase from the Roman period found in Czelin

Czelin is the sight of several archaeological finds, with around 100 objects and 50 burials being discovered between 2004 and 2013. Most of these finds come from a Roman period cemetery and date to the 1st and 2nd centuries AD, being partially attributed to the Przeworsk culture and more specifically the Germanic Burgundians. Bartłomiej Rogalski of the National Museum in Szczecin believes that many of these finds indicate that Czelin was of high political importance at the time.

During the Early Middle Ages, between the middle of the 8th and the 10th century, this area was settled by the Slavic Leubuzzi tribe who established a settlement and gord.

The settlement was first mentioned in 1297 and known as Zellin in 1317. It then was mentioned under various other names such as Czellyn (1348), Czollin (1355), Czellin (1371 & 1515), and then Zellin again in 1491 as well as from 1749 onwards. The name was then changed to Czelin after 1945 when it was annexed by Poland.

During the 14th and 15th centuries, Zellin was home to a notable Waldensian population. Starting in 1355, Zellin was under the ownership of the von Mörner family, which had its seat there, until it was sold to Frederick William I of Prussia in 1733, effectively falling to the state which with it would remain. With its sale, Zellin lost its town rights, specifically the Magdeburg rights, which it had obtained before 1317.

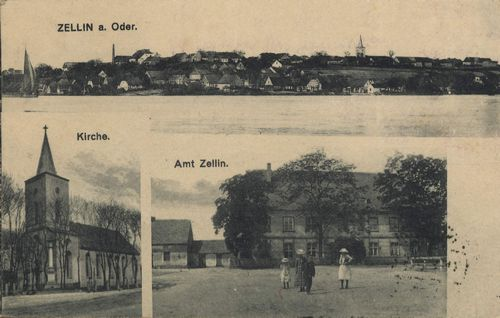
19th century postcard view

There was a fire in Zellin during 1817 that affected multiple buildings. About ten years later, in 1827, there would be another fire, this time one affecting the whole town that would destroy most of it.

The Jewish population of Zellin (now Czelin) was at a constant low, first reported in 1843 as 6, the Jewish population reached its peak in 1859 at 18 residents but then again decreased to 9 in 1871, subsequently only decreasing, first again to 6 in 1905 and then 3 in 1925.

Soviet forces entered the settlement on 2 February 1945 and left around 80% of the town, notably including all industry, destroyed. The German residents fled across of the Oder or were deported, some to Siberia, and the new Polish settlers were disappointed to find the town in ruins after they were promised opportunity and work. On 27 February 1945, the 6th Pontoon-Bridge Battalion of the Polish Army erected a wooden border marker on the bank of the Oder river in what would soon become the village of Czelin. It was the first marker of the new western Polish border, erected by the first unit of the Polish Army to reach it. On 9 October 1968, the marker was replaced with a large commemorative stone obelisk while the old marker itself was moved to the Polish Army Museum in Warsaw.

From 1975 to 1998 part of the Gorzów Voivodeship, Czelin would then pass to the West Pomeranian Voivodeship of which it remains a part today.

== Demographics ==
As of the 2021 census, Czelin has a population of 357 that is split between 50.7% (181) male and 49.3% (176) female. The average age in the village is 39.6.

Historical population

Year	Pop.	±%
1800	1,299	—
1818	1,612	+24.1%
1840	2,048	+27.0%
1871	2,383	+16.4%
1875	2,155	−9.6%
1880	2,102	−2.5%
1890	1,823	−13.3%
1895	1,663	−8.8%

Year	Pop.	±%
1910	1,406	−15.5%
1925	1,353	−3.8%
1933	1,304	−3.6%
1939	1,215	−6.8%
1988	362	−70.2%
2002	398	+9.9%
2011	382	−4.0%
2021	357	−6.5%

Data may be affected by territorial fluctuation.
Sources: 1875, 2021, rest

=== Religious affiliation ===
Like most areas in this region, Czelin was predominantly Protestant before World War II.

Year	Prot.	Cath.	Jews	Irr.
1871	2,360	14	9	0
1885	1,815	2	6	0
1905	1,376	3	3	0
1925	1,327	19	0	4

== Politics ==
As its own sołectwo, Czelin has both a village council (consisting of 5 members) and a sołtys (village head). As of the 2024–2029 term, current sołtys is Wiesława Henk, who was elected during or before the 2015 term, and the composition of the village council (Polish: Rada Sołectwa) is as follows:

1. Andrzej Głowacki
2. Renata Głowacka
3. Ireneusz Mirkiewicz
4. Wojciech Nowak
5. Roman Strychalski

== Culture ==
=== Sights ===
The landmarks of Czelin are the medieval Our Lady of Częstochowa church and the Monument to the first Polish border post on the Oder river. Since March 2013, Czelin is home to an open-air museum of the ancient cemetery.

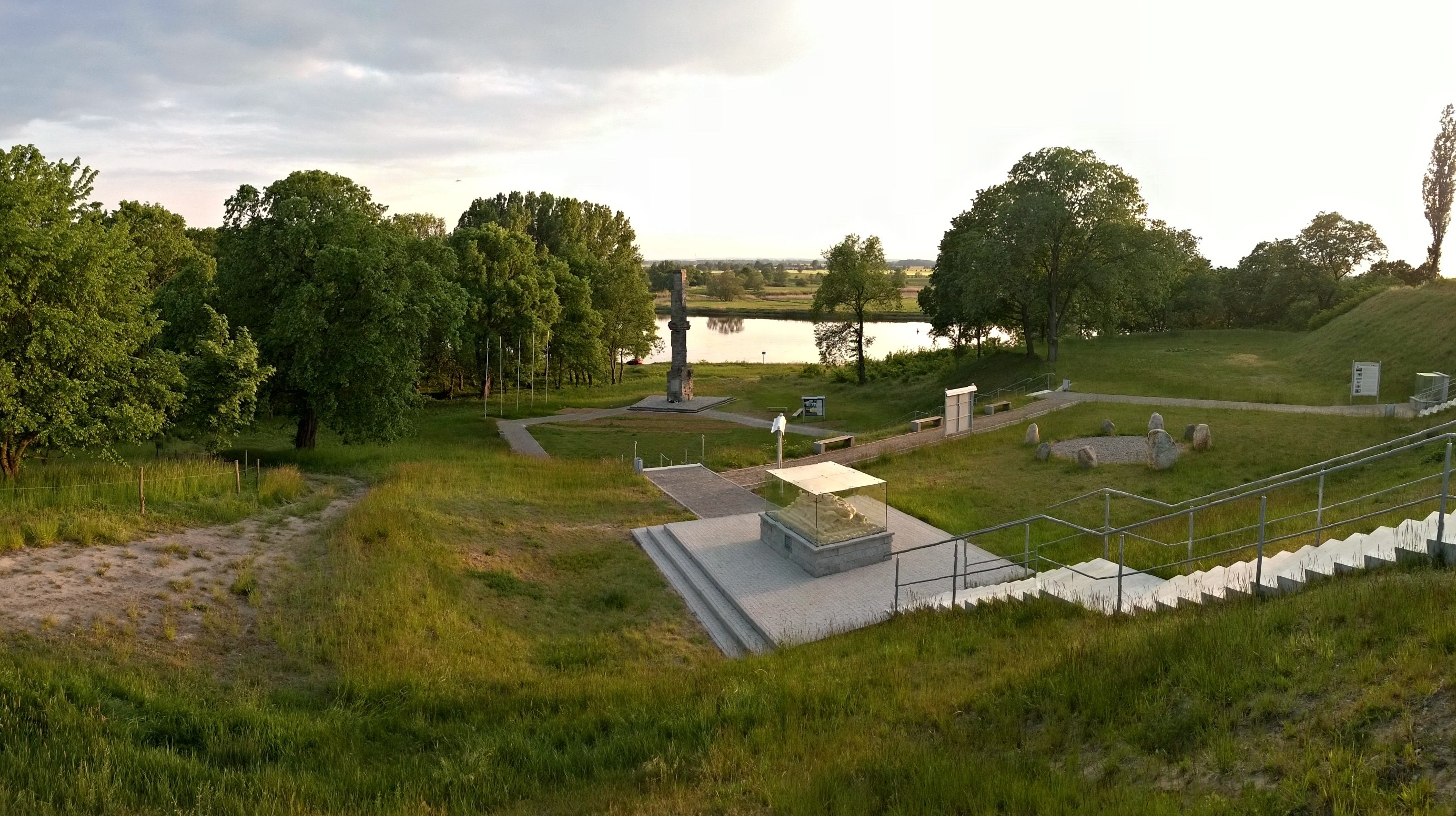
Czellin obelisk park

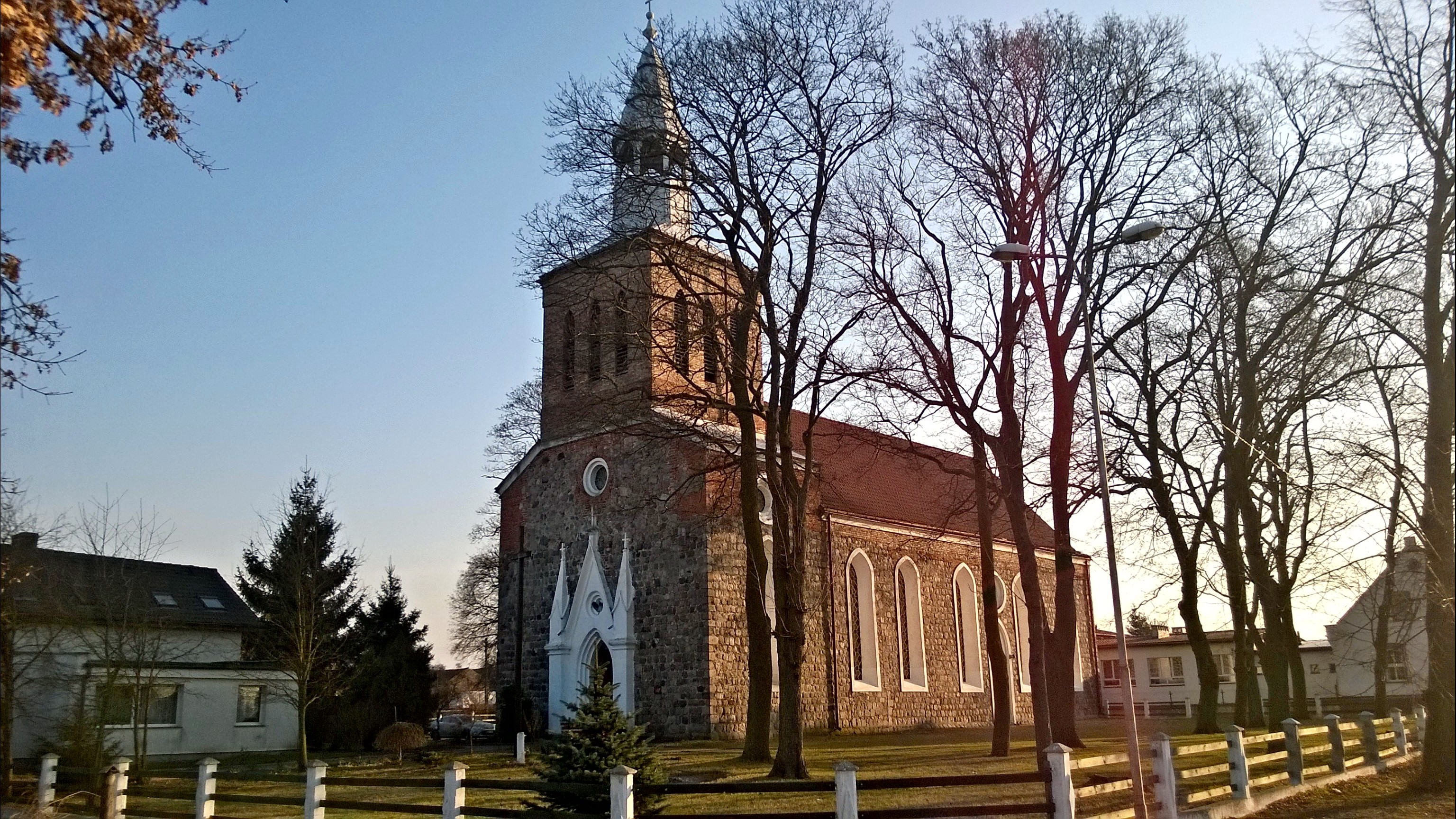
Church

== Notable people ==
- Theodor Grawert (1858–1927), German musician
