= Mirogniew, West Pomeranian Voivodeship =

Mirogniew
- Settlement
- Location within Poland
- Coordinates: 52°45′59″N 14°31′40″E
- Country: Poland
- Voivodeship: West Pomeranian
- County: Gryfino
- Gmina: Mieszkowice

Mirogniew [miˈrɔɡɲɛf] (formerly German Woltershof) is a settlement in the administrative district of Gmina Mieszkowice, within Gryfino County, West Pomeranian Voivodeship, in north-western Poland, close to the German border. It lies approximately 4 km (2 mi) south-east of Mieszkowice, 54 km (34 mi) south of Gryfino, and 73 km (45 mi) south of the regional capital Szczecin.

For the history of the region, see History of Pomerania.
