= Troszyn, Gryfino County =

Troszyn
- Village
- Location within Poland
- Coordinates: 52°46′17″N 14°33′41″E
- Country: Poland
- Voivodeship: West Pomeranian
- County: Gryfino
- Gmina: Mieszkowice
- Elevation: 70 m (230 ft)
- Population: 658

Troszyn [ˈtrɔʂɨn] is a village in the administrative district of Gmina Mieszkowice, within Gryfino County, West Pomeranian Voivodeship, in north-western Poland, close to the German border. It lies approximately 6 km (4 mi) east of Mieszkowice, 54 km (34 mi) south of Gryfino, and 72 km (45 mi) south of the regional capital Szczecin.

For the history of the region, see History of Pomerania.
