= Wierzchlas, West Pomeranian Voivodeship =

Wierzchlas
- Village
- Location within Poland
- Coordinates: 52°49′38″N 14°22′55″E
- Country: Poland
- Voivodeship: West Pomeranian
- County: Gryfino
- Gmina: Mieszkowice
- Elevation: 59 m (194 ft)
- Population: 109

Wierzchlas [ˈvjɛʂxlas] (formerly German Falkenwalde) is a village in the administrative district of Gmina Mieszkowice, within Gryfino County, West Pomeranian Voivodeship, in north-western Poland, close to the German border. It lies approximately 9 km (6 mi) north-west of Mieszkowice, 48 km (30 mi) south of Gryfino, and 67 km (42 mi) south of the regional capital Szczecin.

For the history of the region, see History of Pomerania.

The village has a population of 109.
