= Rogaczewo, West Pomeranian Voivodeship =

Rogaczewo
- Settlement
- Location within Poland
- Coordinates: 52°46′N 14°27′E
- Country: Poland
- Voivodeship: West Pomeranian
- County: Gryfino
- Gmina: Mieszkowice
- Population (2024): 5

Rogaczewo (Polish pronunciation: [rɔɡaˈt͡ʂɛvɔ]; German: Forsthaus Hirschau) is a settlement in the Gmina Mieszkowice, within Gryfino County, West Pomeranian Voivodeship, in north-western Poland, close to the German border. Historically part of Czelin, the settlement continues to administratively belong to the Czelin sołectwo.

== Geography ==
Rogaczewo is the only other settlement, besides Czelin itself, in the Czelin sołectwo of Gmina Mieszkowice. It lies approximately 3 km (2 mi) south-west of Mieszkowice, 54 km (34 mi) south of Gryfino, and 73 km (45 mi) south of the regional capital Szczecin.

The settlement lies in the southern part of the Mieszkowice Forests (Polish: Lasy Mieszkowickie, formerly German: Forst Alt Lietzegöricke), specifically in the former Stölpchensch-Zelliner Heide which is today administered by the Rogaczewo Forest District (Polish: Leśnictwie Rogaczewo) which has seen the planting of new trees in 2025.

To the south of the settlement runs the powiat road Nr. 1418Z (Mieszkowice-Czelin-Gozdowice) which was last renovated in 2017.

== Demographics ==
Historical population
Year	Pop.	±%
1895	7	—
2024	5	−28.6%
Data may be affected by territorial fluctuation. Sources: 1895, 2024
