= Plany =

- Village
- Location within Poland
- Coordinates: 52°47′34″N 14°28′18″E
- Country: Poland
- Voivodeship: West Pomeranian
- County: Gryfino
- Gmina: Mieszkowice

Plany [ˈplanɨ] is a village in the administrative district of Gmina Mieszkowice, within Gryfino County, West Pomeranian Voivodeship, in north-western Poland, close to the German border. It lies approximately 2 km (1 mi) north-west of Mieszkowice, 51 km (32 mi) south of Gryfino, and 70 km (43 mi) south of the regional capital Szczecin.

For the history of the region, see History of Pomerania.
