= Nowiny, West Pomeranian Voivodeship =

Nowiny
- Settlement
- Location within Poland
- Coordinates: 52°48′59″N 14°35′19″E
- Country: Poland
- Voivodeship: West Pomeranian
- County: Gryfino
- Gmina: Mieszkowice
- Elevation: 62 m (203 ft)

Nowiny [nɔˈvinɨ] (formerly German Neues Vorwerk) is a settlement in the administrative district of Gmina Mieszkowice, within Gryfino County, West Pomeranian Voivodeship, in north-western Poland, close to the German border. It lies approximately 8 km (5 mi) north-east of Mieszkowice, 49 km (30 mi) south of Gryfino, and 67 km (42 mi) south of the regional capital Szczecin.

For the history of the region, see History of Pomerania.
