= Kłosów =

Kłosów may refer to the following places in Poland:

- Kłosów, Lower Silesian Voivodeship, (south-west Poland)
- Kłosów, West Pomeranian Voivodeship, (north-west Poland)
