= Stary Błeszyn =

- Village
- Location within Poland
- Coordinates: 52°45′40″N 14°20′39″E
- Country: Poland
- Voivodeship: West Pomeranian
- County: Gryfino
- Gmina: Mieszkowice
- Population: 149

Stary Błeszyn [ˈstarɨ ˈbwɛʂɨn] (formerly German Alt Blessin) is a village in the administrative district of Gmina Mieszkowice, within Gryfino County, West Pomeranian Voivodeship, in north-western Poland, close to the German border. It lies approximately 10 km (6 mi) west of Mieszkowice, 56 km (35 mi) south of Gryfino, and 75 km (47 mi) south of the regional capital Szczecin.

For the history of the region, see History of Pomerania.

The village has a population of 149.
