= Zielin, Gryfino County =

Zielin
- Village
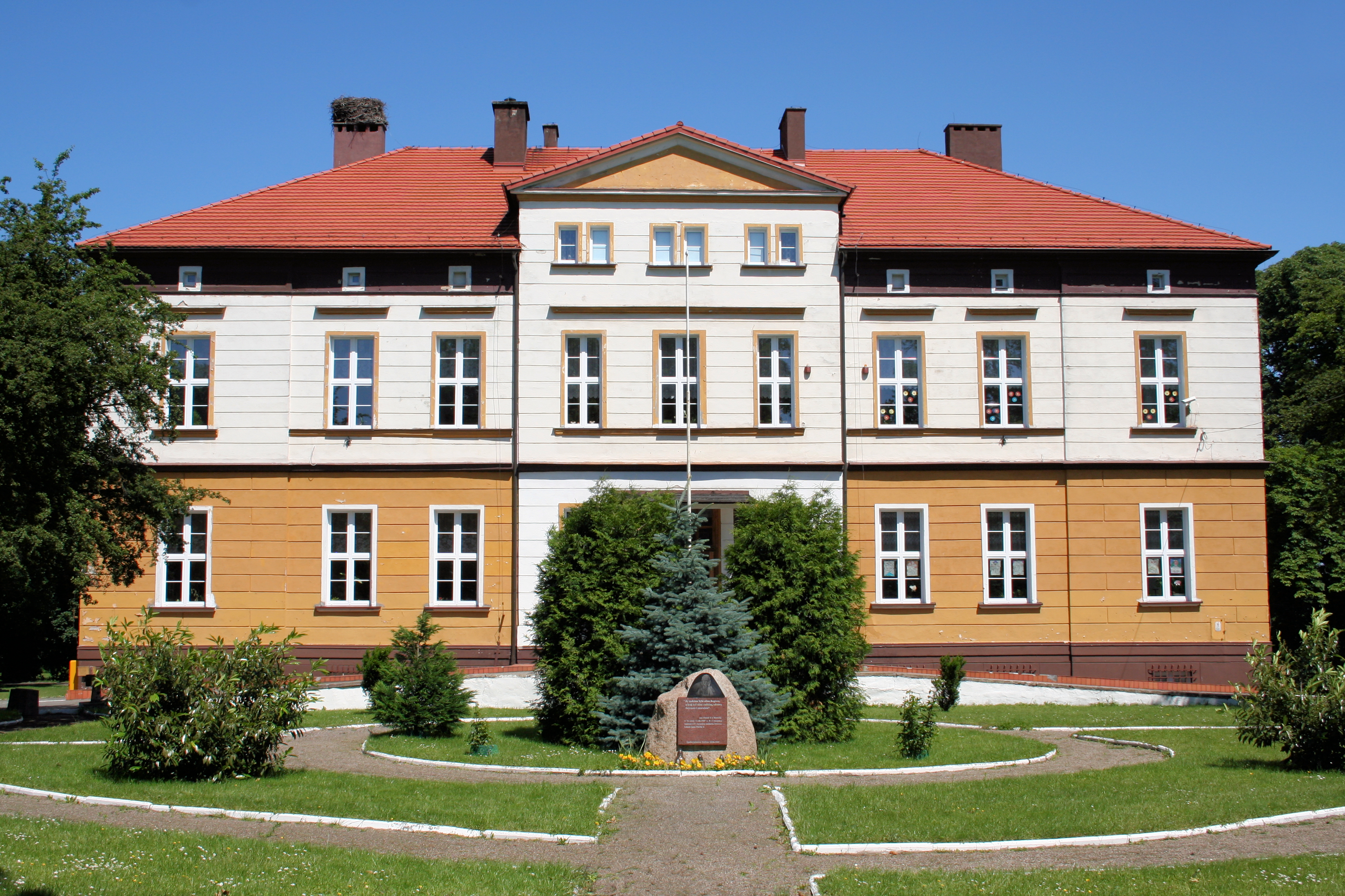
- Zielin Palace

- Location within Poland
- Coordinates: 52°48′8″N 14°34′28″E
- Country: Poland
- Voivodeship: West Pomeranian
- County: Gryfino
- Gmina: Mieszkowice
- Population: 579
- Time zone: UTC+1 (CET)
  - Summer (DST): UTC+2 (CEST)
- Vehicle registration: ZGR

Zielin [ˈʑɛlin] is a village in the administrative district of Gmina Mieszkowice, within Gryfino County, West Pomeranian Voivodeship, in north-western Poland, close to the German border. It lies approximately 7 km (4 mi) east of Mieszkowice, 51 km (32 mi) south of Gryfino, and 69 km (43 mi) south of the regional capital Szczecin.

The village has a population of 579.
