= Lists of political office-holders in Brandenburg =

These are lists of political office-holders in Brandenburg.

== Margraves and Electors ==
- List of margraves and electors of Brandenburg

== Minister-presidents ==
- List of minister-presidents of Brandenburg

== Upper presidents of Brandenburg ==
In 1815 Brandenburg was constituted as the Prussian Province of Brandenburg without a sovereign ruler, but with upper presidents appointed by the central Prussian government. The upper president carried out central prerogatives on the provincial level and supervised the implementation of central policy on the lower levels of administration.

- 1815–1824: Georg Christian von Heydebreck (1765–1828)
- 1825–1840: Friedrich Magnus von Bassewitz (1773–1858)
- 1840–1842: vacant
- 1842–1848: August Werner von Meding (1792–1871)
- 1848–1849: Robert von Patow (1804–1890), per pro
- 1849–1850: vacant
- 1849–1850: August Hermann Klemens Freiherr Wolff von Metternich (1803–1872), per pro
- 1850–1858: Eduard Heinrich von Flottwell (1786–1865)
- 1859–1862: Eduard Heinrich von Flottwell (1786–1865)
- 1862: Werner von Selchow (1806–1884)
- 1862–1879: Gustav von Jagow (1813–1879)
- 1879–1899: Heinrich von Achenbach (1829–1899)
- 1899–1905: Theobald von Bethmann Hollweg (1856–1921)
- 1905–1909: August von Trott zu Solz (1855–1938)
- 1909–1910: Friedrich Wilhelm von Loebell (1855–1931)
- 1910–1914: Alfred von Conrad (1852–1914)
- 1914–1917: Rudolf von der Schulenburg (1860–1930)
- 1917–1919: Friedrich Wilhelm von Loebell (1855–1931)
- 1919–1933: Adolf Maier (1871–1963)
- 1933–1936: Wilhelm Kube (1887–1943)
- 1937–1945: Emil Stürtz (1892–1945), since 1936 per pro

== Land directors of Brandenburg ==
Since 1875, with the strengthening of self-rule within the provinces, the urban and rural counties elected representatives for the provincial diets (Provinziallandtage). These parliaments legislated within the competences transferred to the provinces. The provincial diet of Brandenburg elected a provincial executive body (government), the provincial committee (Provinzialausschuss), and a head of province, the land director (Landesdirektor). Self-rule was abolished under the Nazi dictatorship.

- 1876–1896: Albert Erdmann Karl Gerhard von Levetzow (1827–1903), German Conservative Party
- 1896–1912: Otto von Manteuffel (1844–1913), German Conservative Party
- 1912–1930: Joachim von Winterfeldt-Menkin (1865–1945)
- 1930–1933: Hugo Swart (1885–1952)
- 1933–1944: Dietloff von Arnim (1876–1945), NSDAP

== See also ==
- List of consorts of Brandenburg
- List of Holy Roman Emperors
- List of monarchs of Prussia
- Lists of office-holders
- Lists of political office-holders in East Germany
- Lists of political office-holders in Germany
