= Treaty of Bärwalde =

1631 treaty between France and Sweden

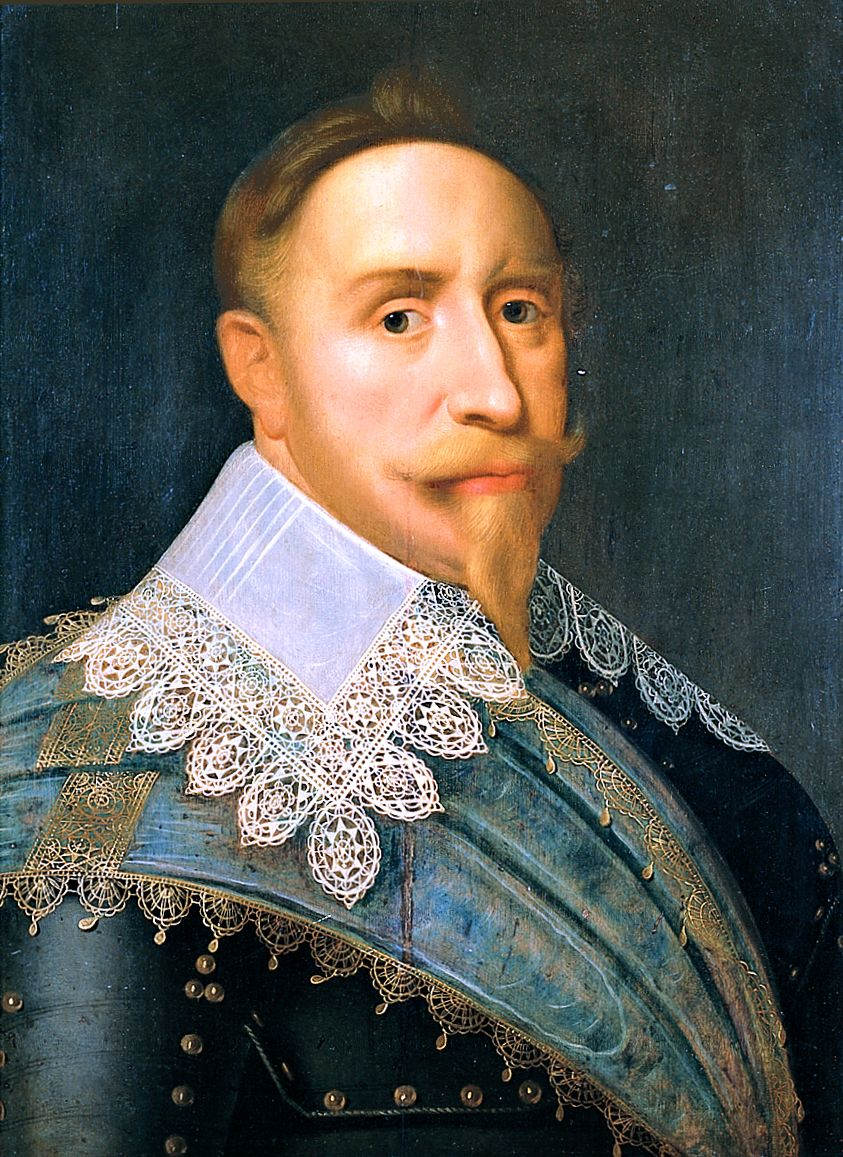
- Gustavus Adolphus of Sweden
- Signed: 23 January 1631
- Location: Bärwalde, now Mieszkowice, Poland
- Original signatories: Kingdom of France: Hercule de Charnacé; Kingdom of Sweden: Gustav Horn; Kingdom of Sweden: Johan Banér
- Parties: Kingdom of France; Kingdom of Sweden
- Languages: German

The Treaty of Bärwalde (Note: French: Traité de Barwalde; Swedish: Fördraget i Bärwalde; German: Vertrag von Bärwalde) signed on 23 January 1631, was an agreement by France to finance Swedish intervention in the Thirty Years' War.

This was in line with Cardinal Richelieu's policy of avoiding direct French involvement, but weakening Habsburg Austria by backing its opponents. Under its terms, Gustavus Adolphus agreed to maintain an army of 36,000 troops, in return for an annual payment of 400,000 Reichsthalers, for a period of five years.

France continued their support after Gustavus was killed at Lützen in November 1632. When the Swedes were defeated at Nördlingen in September 1634, most of their German allies made peace in the Treaty of Prague. Richelieu decided to intervene directly; in 1635, the Franco-Swedish Treaty of Compiègne replaced that agreed at Bärwalde.

== Background ==
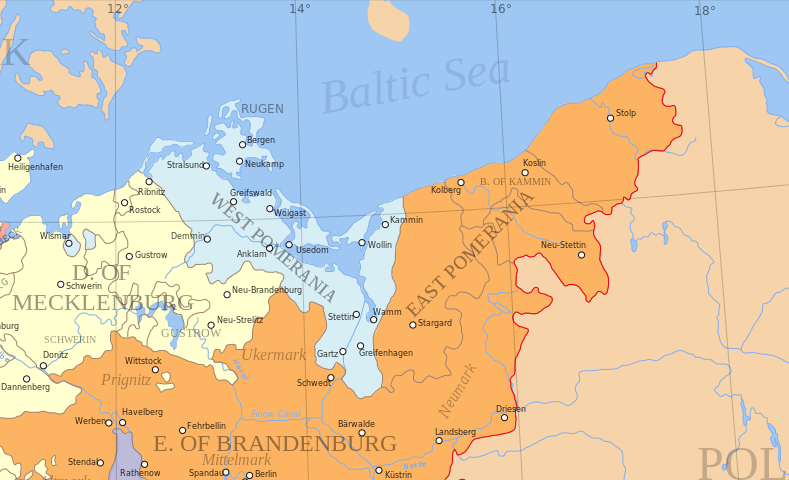
Sweden's acquisition of West Pomerania (in blue) was confirmed in 1653, and although later diminished by territorial losses to Brandenburg, retained until 1815

The Thirty Years War began in 1618 when the Protestant Frederick, ruler of the Electoral Palatinate, accepted the crown of Bohemia. Many Germans remained neutral, viewing it as an inheritance dispute within the Holy Roman Empire, and Emperor Ferdinand II quickly suppressed the Bohemian Revolt. However, Imperial forces then invaded the Palatinate, forcing Frederick into exile.

Depriving Frederick of his inheritance changed the nature and extent of the war, as it potentially threatened other German princes. This concern increased after Ferdinand passed the 1629 Edict of Restitution, which required all church properties transferred since 1552 be restored to their original owners; in nearly every case, this meant from Protestants to the Catholic Church, effectively undoing the 1555 Peace of Augsburg. In addition, Ferdinand financed the Imperial army by allowing it to plunder the territories they passed through, including those of his allies.

The combination bolstered Protestant resistance within the Empire, and drew in external players, concerned by the prospect of a Catholic Counter Reformation. In 1625, Christian IV of Denmark landed in Northern Germany and had some success, before forced to withdraw in 1629. This led to intervention by Gustavus Adolphus of Sweden, partly driven by a genuine desire to support his Protestant co-religionists, but also to ensure control of the Baltic trade that provided much of Sweden's income.

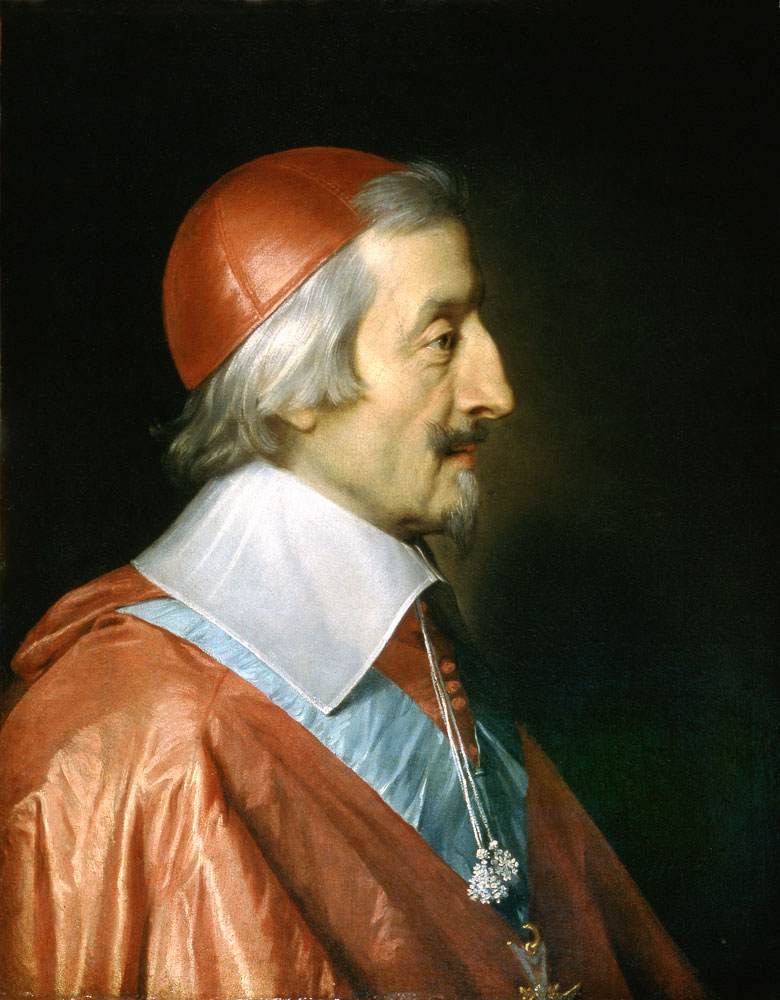
Cardinal Richelieu, French chief minister 1624 to 1642

In June 1630, nearly 18,000 Swedish troops landed in the Duchy of Pomerania, occupied by Wallenstein since 1627. Gustavus signed an alliance with Bogislaw XIV, Duke of Pomerania, securing his interests in Pomerania against the Catholic Polish–Lithuanian Commonwealth, another Baltic competitor linked to Ferdinand by family and religion.

Expectations of widespread support proved unrealistic; by the end of 1630, the only new Swedish ally was the Imperial town of Magdeburg, then besieged by the Catholic League. Despite the devastation inflicted on their territories by Imperial soldiers, Saxony and Brandenburg-Prussia were reluctant to back the Swedes. Both had their own ambitions in Pomerania, which clashed with those of Gustavus, while previous experience showed inviting external powers into the Empire was easier than getting them to leave.

Although the Swedes expelled the Imperials, this simply replaced one set of plunderers with another; Gustavus could not support so large an army, and his unpaid and unfed troops became increasingly mutinous and ill-disciplined. In January 1631, John George of Saxony hosted a conference of German Protestant states at Leipzig, hoping to create a neutrality pact. Gustavus responded by advancing through Brandenburg, as far as Bärwalde, on the Oder, where he set up camp. This secured his rear before moving onto Magdeburg, while making a clear point to those meeting in Leipzig.

== Negotiations ==
For much of the 16th and 17th centuries, Europe was dominated by the rivalry between France and the Habsburgs, rulers of Spain and the Holy Roman Empire. During the 1620s, France was divided by renewed religious wars and Cardinal Richelieu, chief minister from 1624 to 1642, avoided open conflict with the Habsburgs. Instead, he financed their opponents, including the Dutch, the Ottomans, and Danish intervention in the Thirty Years War.

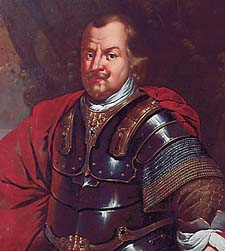
Swedish negotiator Johan Banér

From 1628 to 1630, France fought a proxy war with Spain over Mantua, in Northern Italy. Hoping to use Sweden to occupy Spanish forces in Germany, in 1629 Richelieu appointed Hercule de Charnacé French envoy in the Baltic region, with responsibility for negotiating a deal with Gustavus. Talks progressed slowly; de Charnacé quickly concluded the Swedish monarch was too powerful a character to be easily controlled and urged caution. One major issue was the insistence by Gustavus that Frederick V be restored as ruler of the Palatinate, currently occupied by another French ally, Maximilian of Bavaria.

The (13 October) 1630 Treaty of Ratisbonne concluded the Mantuan War in France's favour but in return, French negotiators undertook not to agree alliances with members of the Holy Roman Empire without Ferdinand's approval. Doing so would undermine the entire basis of French foreign policy; Louis XIII refused to ratify the deal, leading to an internal power struggle between Richelieu and the Queen Mother, Marie de Medici. At one point, it was widely believed he had been dismissed, an event known as the Day of the Dupes.

Although Richelieu triumphed over his domestic opponents, Swedish support became even more important, since as an external player it was not subject to the restrictions of Ratisbonne. De Charnacé was instructed to agree a treaty as soon as possible; after discussions with the Swedish diplomats, Gustav Horn and Johan Banér, it was signed at Bärwalde on 23 January 1631.

== Terms ==
The stated purpose of the agreement was securing the Baltics, and ensuring freedom of trade, including French trading privileges in the Øresund strait. Sweden agreed to maintain an army of 36,000 in Germany, of which 6,000 were cavalry; to support this force, France agreed to pay 400,000 Reichstaler or one million livres per year, plus an additional 120,000 Reichstalers for 1630. These subsidies were less than 2% of the total French state budget, but over 25% of the Swedish. (Note: The Venetian Republic agreed to reimburse France one third of this subsidy, as Richelieu argued it weakened their opponents in Northern Italy.)

Gustavus promised to comply with Imperial laws on religion, allow freedom of worship for Catholics and respect the neutrality of Bavaria and the lands of the Catholic League. Both parties agreed not to seek a separate peace and the period of the treaty was set at five years.

== Aftermath ==
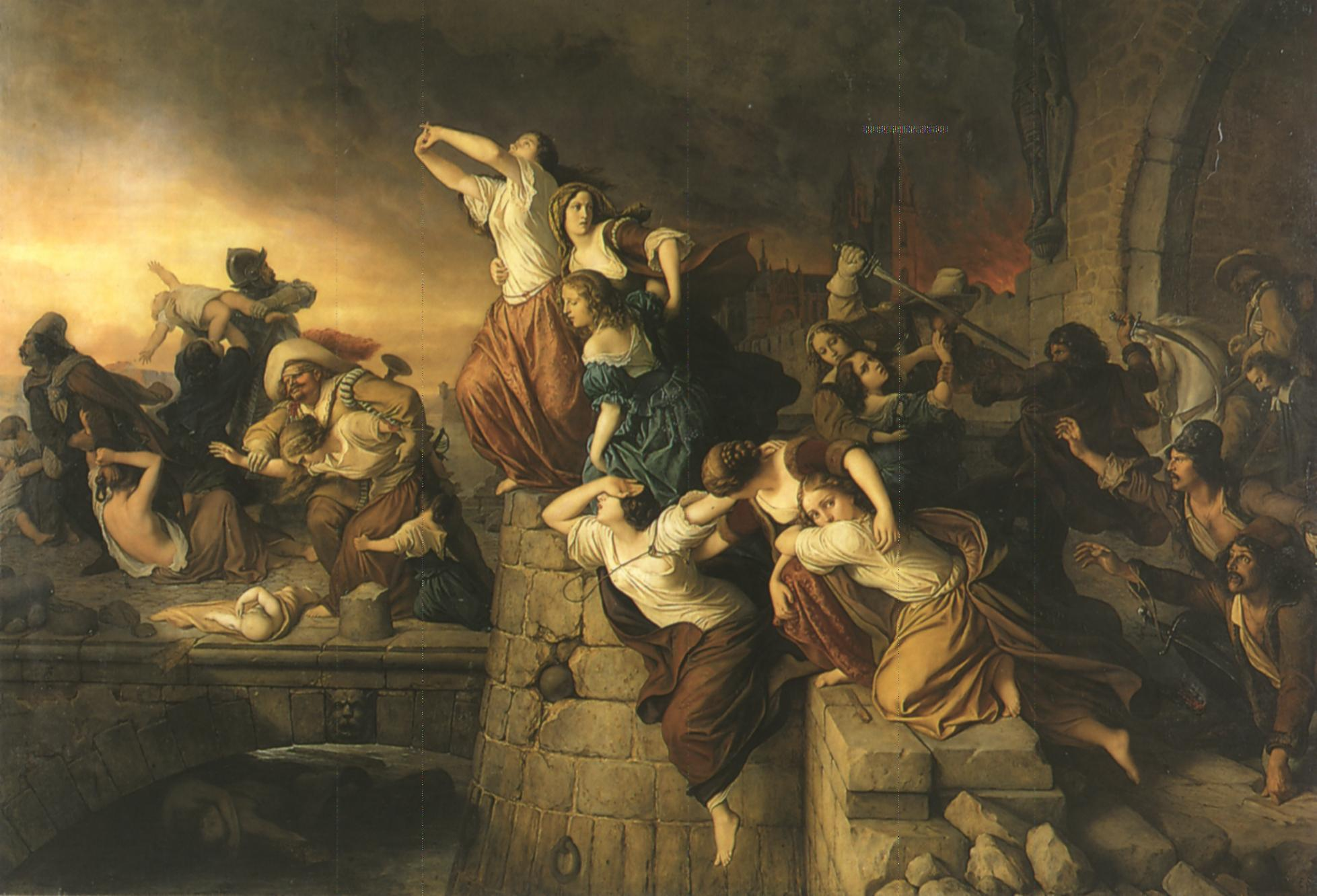
19th century depiction of the Sack of Magdeburg; it shocked European Protestants and made Gustavus largely independent of French control

The haste with which the treaty was agreed concealed serious weaknesses, which soon became apparent. In May 1631, an army of the Catholic League under the Bavarian Count Tilly sacked the Protestant town of Magdeburg. Over 20,000 were alleged to have died in the most serious atrocity of the entire war, increasing the bitterness of the conflict and leading to intervention by other Protestant states. Gustavus embarked on a series of stunning military victories, and Protestant retribution for Magdeburg became a considerable embarrassment for Richelieu, a Cardinal of the Catholic Church.

Under the May 1631 Franco-Bavarian Treaty of Fontainebleau, Richelieu agreed to provide Maximilian military support if attacked by any other party. In theory, it did not conflict with the terms of Bärwalde, since Gustavus undertook to respect Bavarian and Catholic League neutrality. In practice, his obligation applied only so long as their compliance and as Richelieu pointed out to Maximilian, even Tilly's presence at Magdeburg violated that neutrality.

The poorly worded Bärwalde treaty gave Gustavus a great deal of freedom, while Magdeburg brought him support from the Dutch and England among others. This made him increasingly independent of French control; his upward trajectory ended only with his death at Lützen in November 1632. Swedish intervention continued with French support, until defeat at Nördlingen in September 1634; this forced the Swedish army to temporarily retreat, while most of their German allies made peace with Emperor Ferdinand in the 1635 Treaty of Prague.

Combined with rumours of a proposed Austro-Spanish offensive in the Spanish Netherlands, Louis XIII and Richelieu now decided on direct intervention. In early 1635, they declared war on Spain, beginning the 1635 to 1659 Franco-Spanish War, and agreed the Treaty of Compiègne with Sweden, an alliance against Emperor Ferdinand. This continued until the 1648 Peace of Westphalia, which confirmed the acquisition of Swedish Pomerania; the wording was ambiguous and only finalised by the Treaty of Stettin (1653). With the exception of some territorial adjustments in favour of Brandenburg, Sweden retained this territory until 1815.

== Sources ==
- Bireley, Robert (2014). Ferdinand II, Counter-Reformation Emperor, 1578-1637. Cambridge University Press. ISBN 978-1107067158.
- Brzezinski, Richard (2001). Lützen 1632; climax of the 30 Years War. Osprey. ISBN 9781855325524.
- Dodge, Theodore Ayrault (1895). Gustavus Adolphus: A History of the Art of War From Its Revival After the Middle Ages to the End of the Spanish Succession War (2018 ed.). Forgotten Books. ISBN 978-0331269321.
- Knox, Bill (2017). Tucker, Spencer (ed.). Enduring Controversies in Military History Volume I: Critical Analyses and Context. Greenwood Press. ISBN 978-1440841194.
- Lutz, Heinrich; Kohler, Alfred (2002). Reformation und Gegenreformation; Volume 10 of Oldenbourg Grundriss der Geschichte (in German). Oldenbourg Wissenschaftsverlag. ISBN 3-486-49585-2.
- Norrhem, Svante (2019). Mercenary Swedes; French subsidies to Sweden 1631-1796. Translated by Merton, Charlotte. Nordic Academic Press. ISBN 978-91-88661-82-1.
- O'Connell, Daniel Patrick (1968). Richelieu. Weidenfeld & Nicolson.
- Parker, Geoffrey; Adams, Simon (1997). The Thirty Years' War. Routledge. ISBN 0-415-12883-8.
- Poot, Anton (2013). Crucial years in Anglo-Dutch relations (1625-1642): the political and diplomatic contacts. Uitgeverij Verloren. ISBN 978-9087043803.
- Porshnev, Boris Fedorovich; Dukes, Paul (1995). Muscovy and Sweden in the Thirty Years' War, 1630-1635. Cambridge University Press. ISBN 052145139-6.
- Spielvogel, Jackson (2006). Western Civilization (2014 ed.). Wadsworth Publishing. ISBN 978-1285436401.
- Wedgwood, C.V. (1938). The Thirty Years War (2005 ed.). New York Review of Books. ISBN 978-1-59017-146-2.
