= Ranowo =

- Settlement
- Location within Poland
- Coordinates: 52°48′0″N 14°32′32″E
- Country: Poland
- Voivodeship: West Pomeranian
- County: Gryfino
- Gmina: Mieszkowice
- Time zone: UTC+01:00 (CET)
  - Summer (DST): UTC+02:00 (CEST)

Ranowo [raˈnɔvɔ] is a settlement in the administrative district of Gmina Mieszkowice, within Gryfino County, West Pomeranian Voivodeship, in north-western Poland, close to the German border.

For the history of the region, see History of Pomerania.
