= Kępa Troszyńska =

- Village
- Location within Poland
- Coordinates: 52°46′44″N 14°31′54″E
- Country: Poland
- Voivodeship: West Pomeranian
- County: Gryfino
- Gmina: Mieszkowice
- Elevation: 63 m (207 ft)

Kępa Troszyńska [ˈkɛmpa trɔˈʂɨɲska] (formerly German Kapernaum) is a village in the administrative district of Gmina Mieszkowice, within Gryfino County, West Pomeranian Voivodeship, in north-western Poland, close to the German border. It lies approximately 4 km (2 mi) east of Mieszkowice, 53 km (33 mi) south of Gryfino, and 71 km (44 mi) south of the regional capital Szczecin.

For the history of the region, see History of Pomerania.
