= Ostępy =

- Settlement
- Location within Poland
- Coordinates: 52°50′09″N 14°34′39″E
- Country: Poland
- Voivodeship: West Pomeranian
- County: Gryfino
- Gmina: Mieszkowice

Ostępy [ɔsˈtɛmpɨ] (formerly German: Vorwerk Karlsfelde) is a settlement in the administrative district of Gmina Mieszkowice, within Gryfino County, West Pomeranian Voivodeship, in north-western Poland, close to the German border.

For the history of the region, see History of Pomerania.
