= Kurzycko =

- Village
- Location within Poland
- Coordinates: 52°45′41″N 14°28′2″E
- Country: Poland
- Voivodeship: West Pomeranian
- County: Gryfino
- Gmina: Mieszkowice
- Elevation: 39 m (128 ft)
- Population: 223

Kurzycko [kuˈʐɨt͡skɔ] (formerly German Voigtsdorf) is a village in the administrative district of Gmina Mieszkowice, within Gryfino County, West Pomeranian Voivodeship, in north-western Poland, close to the German border. It lies approximately 3 km (2 mi) south-west of Mieszkowice, 55 km (34 mi) south of Gryfino, and 74 km (46 mi) south of the regional capital Szczecin.

For the history of the region, see History of Pomerania.

The village has a population of 223.
