= Gmina Mieszkowice =

Gmina Mieszkowice Mieszkowice Commune
- Gmina
- Coat of arms

- Location within Poland
- Coordinates (Mieszkowice): 52°47′N 14°29′E
- Country: Poland
- Voivodeship: West Pomeranian
- County: Gryfino
- Seat: Mieszkowice

Area
  - Total: 238.67 km^{2} (92.15 sq mi)

Population (2006)
  - Total: 7,457
  - Density: 31.24/km^{2} (80.92/sq mi)
  - Urban: 3,553
  - Rural: 3,904
- Website: http://www.mieszkowice.pl/

Gmina Mieszkowice is an urban-rural gmina (administrative district) in Gryfino County, West Pomeranian Voivodeship, in north-western Poland, on the German border. Its seat is the town of Mieszkowice, which lies approximately 52 kilometres (32 mi) south of Gryfino and 71 km (44 mi) south of the regional capital Szczecin.

The gmina covers an area of 238.67 square kilometres (92.2 sq mi), and as of 2006 its total population is 7,457 (out of which the population of Mieszkowice amounts to 3,553, and the population of the rural part of the gmina is 3,904).

The gmina contains part of the protected area called Cedynia Landscape Park.

== Villages ==
Apart from the town of Mieszkowice, Gmina Mieszkowice contains the villages and settlements of Chrzęstno, Czelin, Goszków, Goszkówek, Gozdowice, Jamno, Kamionka, Kępa Troszyńska, Kiwity, Kłosów, Kurzycko, Mirogniew, Motary, Nowiny, Ostępy, Plany, Ranowo, Rogaczewo, Sitno, Stare Łysogórki, Stary Błeszyn, Starzyn, Troszyn, Wierzchlas, Wierzchlasek and Zielin.

== Neighbouring gminas ==
Gmina Mieszkowice is bordered by the gminas of Boleszkowice, Cedynia, Chojna, Dębno, Moryń and Trzcińsko-Zdrój. It also borders Germany.
