= Chrzęstno =

- Settlement
- Country: Poland
- Voivodeship: West Pomeranian
- County: Gryfino
- Gmina: Mieszkowice

Chrzęstno [ˈxʂɛ̃stnɔ] is a settlement in the administrative district of Gmina Mieszkowice, within Gryfino County, West Pomeranian Voivodeship, in north-western Poland, close to the German border.

For the history of the region, see History of Pomerania.
