= Albert von Levetzow =

German politician

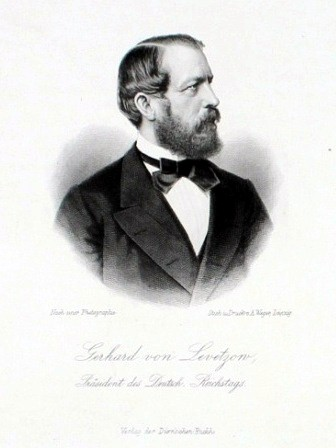

President of the Reichstag
- In office November 1888 – March 1895
- Preceded by: Wilhelm von Wedell-Piesdorf
- Succeeded by: Freiherr von Buol-Berenberg
- In office November 1881 – November 1884
- Preceded by: Gustav von Gossler
- Succeeded by: Wilhelm von Wedell-Piesdorf

Personal details
- Born: Albert Erdmann Karl Gerhard von Levetzow; 12 September 1827 Gossow, Königsberg, Kingdom of Prussia
- Died: 12 August 1903 (aged 75) Gossow, Königsberg, Kingdom of Prussia
- Party: Conservative (Prussia); Conservative (German)
- Education: Humboldt University of Berlin; Ruprecht-Karls University; Friedrich University

Albert Erdmann Karl Gerhard von Levetzow (12 September 1827 – 12 August 1903) was a German politician in the German Conservative Party. He was a member of the North German Confederation Reichstag from 1867 to 1871 and the German Empire Reichstag from 1877 to 1884 and 1887 to 1903, during which time he twice served as its president. From 1890 until his death, he belonged to the Prussian House of Lords. From 1876 to 1896, von Levetzow was also state director of the Brandenburg Provincial Association.

== Early life ==
Levetzow was a member of the noble Levetzow family, who were originally from Mecklenburg. His brother was Karl von Levetzow.

He attended the Marienstiftsgymnasium in Stettin. After graduating from high school, he studied law and political science from 1846 to 1849 at the Humboldt University in Berlin, the Ruprecht-Karls University in Heidelberg and the Friedrich University in Halle. He became active in the Corps Saxo-Borussia Heidelberg in 1847 and the Corps Marchia Halle in 1851. He joined the Kingdom of Prussia's judiciary in 1849 as an auscultator (trainee lawyer) and became a court assessor in c. 1855.

== Career ==
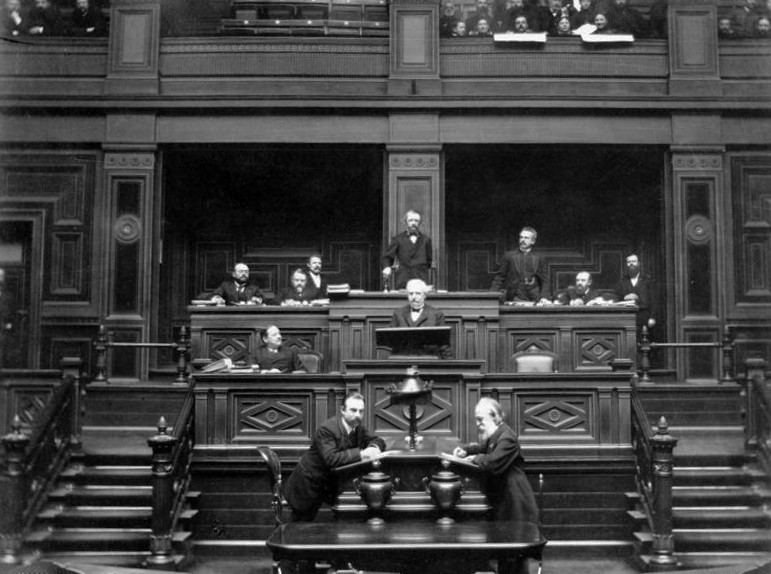
Levetzow as President of the Reichstag, Plenary Hall, Leipziger Straße, 1889

In 1857, Levetzow moved to internal administration and came to the Prussian Ministry of Spiritual, Educational and Medical Affairs as a government assessor. In 1860, he took a leave of absence before fully leaving the civil service a year later to manage Goszków, the family manor which consisted of 544-hectare (1,340-acre) of which 38-hectare (94-acre) were forest.

From 1867 to 1876 he was district administrator of the Königsberg (Neumark) district, and, from 1876 to 1896, regional director of the Brandenburg Provincial Association.

For the Prussian Conservative Party, Levetzow sat in the Reichstag of the North German Confederation from 1867 to 1871, where he represented the constituency of Königsberg (Neumark). From 1877 to 1884, as a member of the German Conservative Party, he was a member of the 3rd constituency of the Frankfurt (Oder) district in the Imperial Reichstag. After a three-year break, he returned to the Reichstag in 1887, where he served for four more legislative periods until his death in 1903. From 1881 to 1884, and from 1888 to 1895, he was President of the Reichstag. In 1895, Levetzowstrasse in Berlin-Moabit was named after him. In 1897 he took over the leadership of the German Conservative faction serving in the Reichstag. In 1890 Levetzow was appointed a life member of the Prussian House of Lords by King Wilhelm II.

Levetzow held various honorary positions in the Protestant church. In 1880 and 1881, he served as President of the Provincial Synod of the Church Province of Brandenburg. The Albert-Charlotten-Heim eye hospital was founded in 1882 by Levetzow. He took part in the Evangelical Church Building Association, founded in 1884. At the request of Queen Augusta Victoria, he headed the Evangelical Church Aid Association from its founding on 28 May 1888 until his death.

From 1890, he was an honorary member of the Lower Lusatian Society for Anthropology and Archaeology, and also honorary president of the German historical association known as Brandenburgia. He became treasurer of the Order of St. John in 1884. Levetzow also served as canon of the Bishopric of Brandenburg.

== Personal life ==
In 1864, Levetzow was married to Charlotte von Oertzen-Sophienhof. Together, they were the parents of:

- Gerd Heinrich von Levetzow (d. 1869), who died young;
- Gerd Wilhelm von Levetzow (1874–1925), who married Esther von Kleist-Rauden, who owned 102-hectare (250-acre) estate in Neumark with Groß-Wubiser.

His surviving son inherited Goszków as well as Groß-Wubiser from his uncle Karl von Levetzow.
