= Kłosów, West Pomeranian Voivodeship =

Kłosów
- Village
- Location within Poland
- Coordinates: 52°44′31″N 14°27′39″E
- Country: Poland
- Voivodeship: West Pomeranian
- County: Gryfino
- Gmina: Mieszkowice
- Elevation: 30 m (98 ft)
- Population: 224

Kłosów [ˈkwɔsuf] (formerly German Klossow) is a village in the administrative district of Gmina Mieszkowice, within Gryfino County, West Pomeranian Voivodeship, in north-western Poland, close to the German border. It lies approximately 5 km (3 mi) south of Mieszkowice, 57 km (35 mi) south of Gryfino, and 76 km (47 mi) south of the regional capital Szczecin.

For the history of the region, see History of Pomerania.

The village has a population of 224.
