= Jamno, Koszalin =

Jamno
- part of the city
- Location within Poland
- Coordinates: 54°14′42″N 16°10′3″E
- Country: Poland
- Voivodeship: West Pomeranian
- County: Koszalin
- Population: 530

Jamno [ˈjamnɔ] (German: Jamund) is a part of the city Koszalin in West Pomeranian Voivodeship, in north-western Poland. It lies approximately 13 kilometres (8 mi) east of Będzino and 139 km (86 mi) north-east of the regional capital Szczecin.

The village has a population of 530. Until 31 December 2009 it was a part of gmina Będzino.
