= Jamno, Pomeranian Voivodeship =

Jamno
- Village
- Location within Poland
- Coordinates: 54°12′53″N 17°37′53″E
- Country: Poland
- Voivodeship: Pomeranian
- County: Bytów
- Gmina: Parchowo
- Population: 278

Jamno [ˈjamnɔ], Kashubian: Jómno is a village in Gmina Parchowo, Bytów County, Pomeranian Voivodeship, in northern Poland.

From 1975 to 1998 the village was in Słupsk Voivodeship.
