= Jamno, Gryfino County =

Jamno
- Settlement
- Location within Poland
- Coordinates: 52°49′56″N 14°31′41″E
- Country: Poland
- Voivodeship: West Pomeranian
- County: Gryfino
- Gmina: Mieszkowice

Jamno [ˈjamnɔ] is a settlement in the administrative district of Gmina Mieszkowice, within Gryfino County, West Pomeranian Voivodeship, in north-western Poland, close to the German border.

For the history of the region, see History of Pomerania.
