= Mieszkowice =

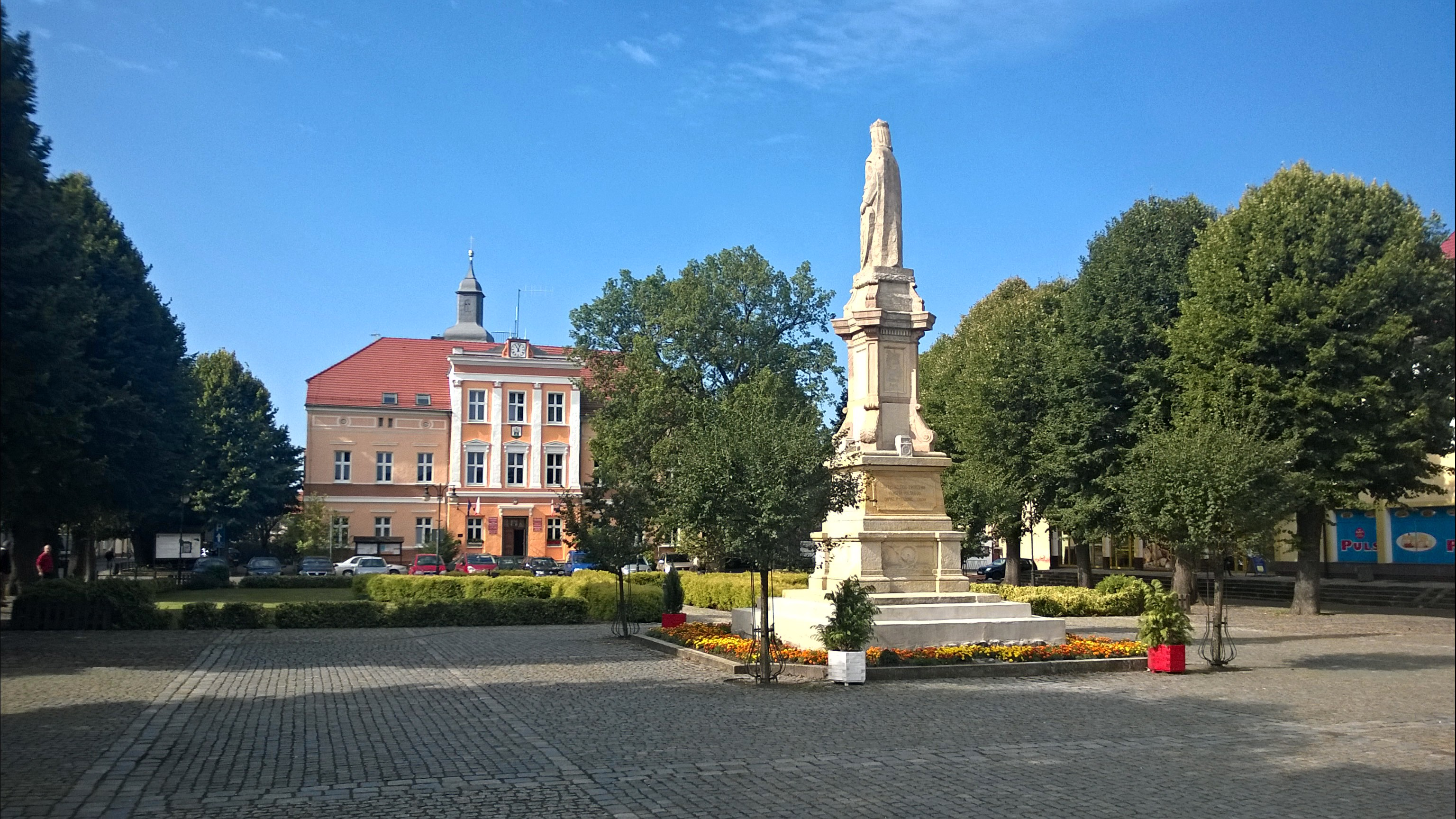
- Plac Wolności (Freedom Square) with the monument of Mieszko I in the foreground and town hall in the background

- Flag Coat of arms

- Location within Poland
- Coordinates: 52°47′N 14°29′E
- Country: Poland
- Voivodeship: West Pomeranian
- County: Gryfino
- Gmina: Mieszkowice
- First mentioned: 1285
- Town rights: 1298

Area
  - Total: 4.73 km^{2} (1.83 sq mi)

Population (2006)
  - Total: 3,553
  - Density: 751/km^{2} (1,950/sq mi)
- Time zone: UTC+1 (CET)
  - Summer (DST): UTC+2 (CEST)
- Postal code: 74-505
- Vehicle registration: ZGR
- Website: http://www.mieszkowice.pl

Mieszkowice [mʲɛʂkɔˈvʲit͡sɛ] (German: Bärwalde in der Neumark) is a town in Gryfino County, West Pomeranian Voivodeship in western Poland, about 15 km (9.3 mi) east of the Oder river and the border with Germany. It is the administrative seat of the urban-rural gmina (municipality) of Mieszkowice.

With origins as a medieval settlement within the borders of the Kingdom of Poland, it developed into a town in the late 13th century during the Ostsiedlung, after the annexation of the area by Brandenburg, the town was the site of death of the last Ascanian margrave in 1319, a center of the Waldensians movement in the 14th century, and the site of the conclusion of a Franco-Swedish alliance during the Thirty Years' War, which else virtually depopulated the town. After the war, the town slowly recovered, retaining a rural character. In the late 19th century, it was connected to the railroad. During World War II the town largely escaped destruction, and in 1945 became again part of Poland. It was renamed Barwice, then Mieszkowice after Mieszko I of Poland, the first historic ruler of Poland, who first included the area within the emerging Polish state.

== Name ==
The town now called Mieszkowice was known from the late 13th century until 1945 under the German name of Berenwalde and later of Bärwalde. To distinguish it from the town of Bärwalde in Pomerania (present-day Barwice), it carried the abbreviation Nm. for Neumark (New March) . In 1945 it was renamed Mieszkowice, after the first historical Polish duke Mieszko I, a scion of the Piast dynasty. Mieszko I included the area within the early Polish state in the 10th century and fought the victorious Battle of Cedynia against the Saxon margrave Odo I nearby in 972.

== History ==
=== Middle Ages ===
In the High Middle Ages, a Slavic settlement existed there, located on a trade route connecting Lubusz Land with Pomerania. Also there are remains of a Slavic fortress nearby. The area became part of the emerging Polish state under its first ruler Mieszko I of Poland in 963. Later it was part of Pomerania, and then Greater Poland within fragmented Poland, until its annexation by the Ascanian margraves of Brandenburg in the 1284, who then founded the town at the site.

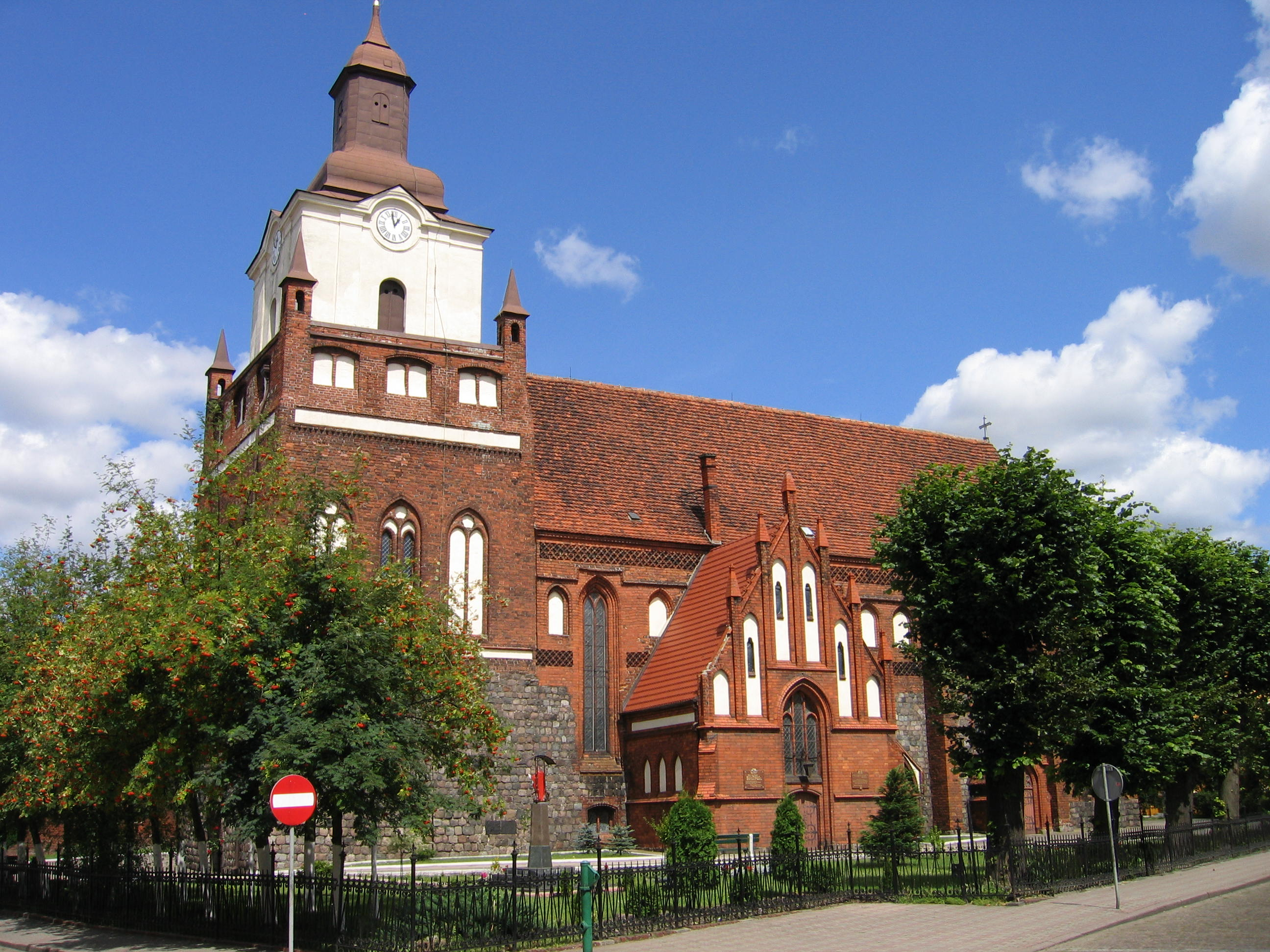
Church of the Transfiguration

The first record of Bärwalde is a 1295 deed under the name of Berenwalde. Most likely, the settlement was owned by a knight of the von Behr family. The settlement was developed following a grid of rectangular streets with a central market place. In 1297, St. Mary's Church was first mentioned, and another document gives 1298 as the year when Bärwalde was granted German town law. In the late 13th and early 14th century the city walls were constructed, much of which still exist, while the city gates were pulled down in 1867.

In 1319, the last Ascanian margrave Waldemar died in the town, After his death a war broke out over control of the region, and the town came again under control of the Duchy of Pomerania, but it fell back to Brandenburg after 1328. Thereafter, throughout the 14th century, Bärwalde was subordinated directly to the Holy Roman Emperor and the regional center to 29 surrounding villages. During this period, it was strongly affected by the Waldensians (Waldenser) movement. Since 1353 coins for Brandenburg's New March were struck at the Bärwalde mint.

In 1373, the region became part of the Bohemian (Czech) Crown Lands, ruled by the Luxembourg dynasty. In 1402, the Luxembourgs reached an agreement with Poland in Kraków, according to which Poland was to purchase and re-incorporate the region, but eventually the Luxembourgs sold it to the Teutonic Order. Under Teutonic rule, the region was neglected, resulting in the town's economic decline, and robberies became widespread. In addition, in the course of the Polish–Teutonic War the town was burnt down in 1433 by Hussite forces marching through. When another Polish-Teutonic war broke out in 1454, the Teutonic Knights sold the region to Brandenburg in order to raise funds for war.

=== Modern era ===
The town suffered fires in 1540 and 1568. During the Thirty Years' War, the Swedish field marshal Gustav Horn on 23 January 1631 signed the Treaty of Bärwalde with France against Emperor Ferdinand II of Habsburg, whereafter the town was devastated by Swedish and Imperial troops several times. The devastations of the war resulted in a severe population drop: only 30 inhabitants remained. From 1650 to 1673 Elias Loccelius, also known as Elias Lockelius or Löckel, (1621–1704) was pastor in Bärwalde and from there he moved to Drossen (today Ośno Lubuskie). He is known as a chronicler of the New March and was an electoral church inspector for Torzym Land (at that time Sternberg Land) as well. Löckel documented the wartime devastation of the area, including Bärwalde, in his Marchia Illustrata.

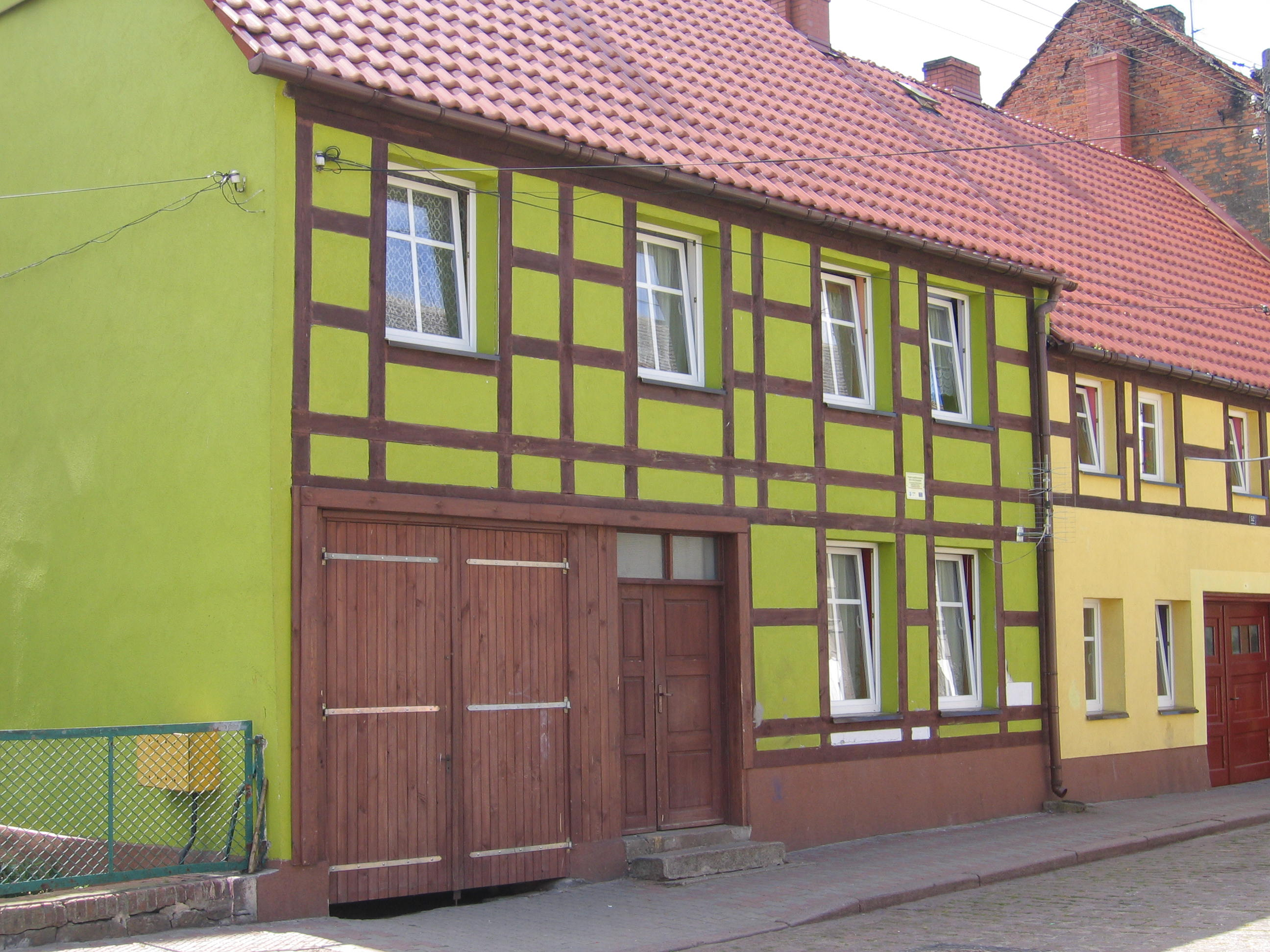
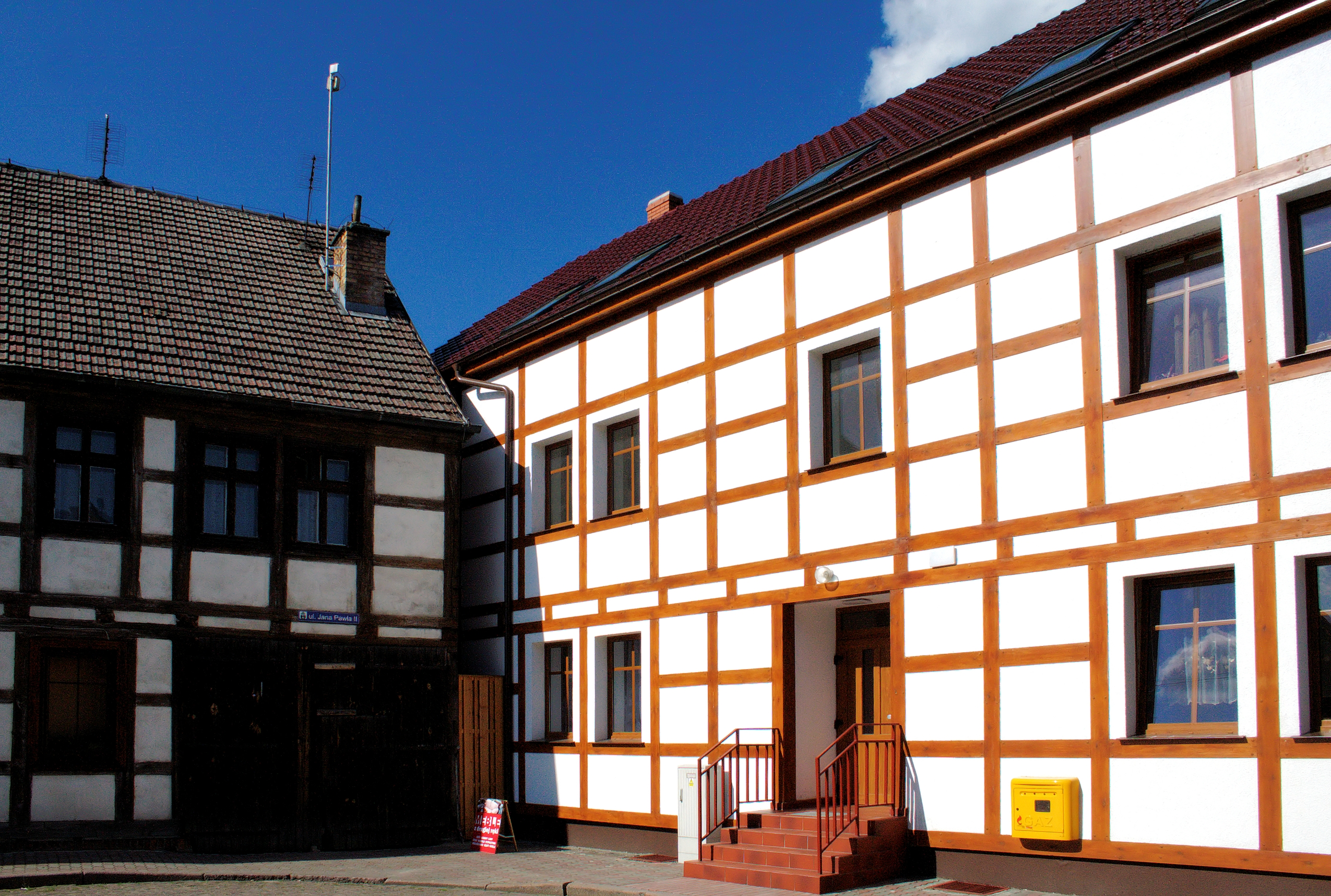
Old timber-framed houses

Over the next centuries, the town slowly recovered: in 1750, it had about 1,500 inhabitants, and more than 3,500 in 1850, occupied primarily with agriculture. From that period, several 18th-century timber framed buildings and the early 19th-century town hall are preserved. During the Napoleonic Wars and Polish national liberation fights, in 1807, French and Polish troops marched through the town. When the Kingdom of Prussia reformed her administrative organization after the Napoleonic Wars, the town became part of the Province of Brandenburg created from the territory of the former margraviate. In 1853 a railroad connected it with Kostschin (Kostrzyn). Twenty- three years later the town was connected with Stettin (Szczecin).

During World War II, under Nazi Germany, forced laborers, mostly Poles, worked in the town. The town was captured on 4 February 1945 by the Red Army during the Vistula–Oder Offensive in the final period of World War II, and as it was east of the Oder-Neisse line, became again part of Poland. Only 30% of the town was destroyed. The remaining inhabitants were expelled and the town was resettled by Poles, including settlers from Central Poland and expellees from former Eastern Poland (Kresy). Bärwalde was first renamed Barwice, later Mieszkowice after Mieszko I of Poland. The final name was chosen for political purposes: the Communist regime sought to legitimize its presence at the Oder by referring to the medieval Piast dynasty, whose territory had also extended to the Oder, and propagated the "return" to ancient Polish lands. To that effect, a legend was popularized in Mieszkowice, linking the town's foundation to a hunting expedition of Mieszko I: Allegedly, the town was founded at a spot where Mieszko once slew two bears. In 1957, a statue of Mieszko I created by Sławomir Lewiński was unveiled on the town square.

Development of Mieszkowice continued in the following years, especially in the period between 1970 and 1992 when many new buildings were constructed. In 1997 the whole town was connected to the gas pipeline. In 1998 a new sport centre was opened. Until 1998, Mieszkowice was administratively part of the Szczecin Voivodeship. Since 2007, a ferry service connects Mieszkowice with Güstebieser Loose on the opposite bank of the Oder. In 2016, town limits were expanded by including parts of the villages of Kępa Troszyńska and Kurzycko.

== Sights ==
Sights of Mieszkowice

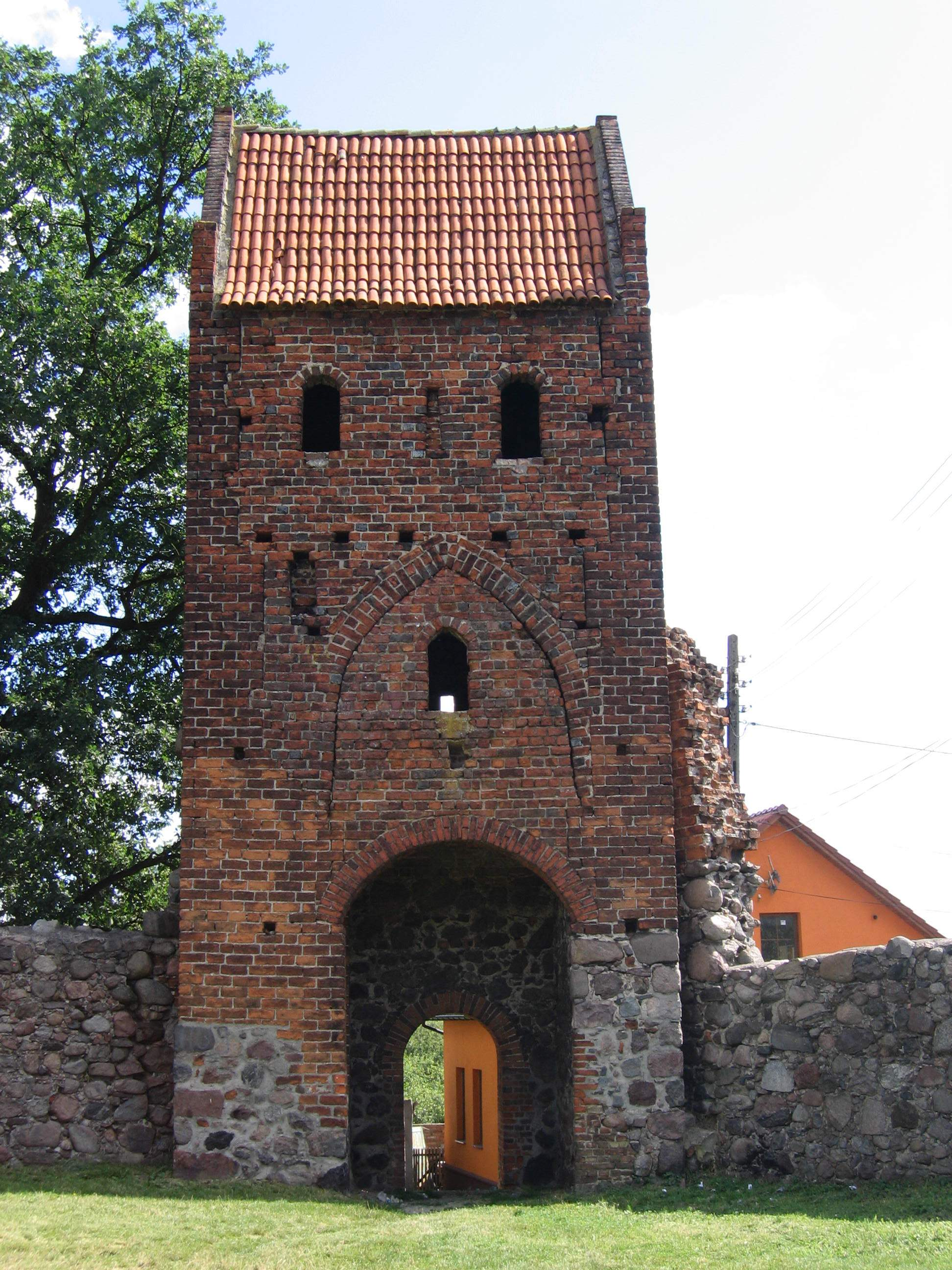
Powder Tower (Baszta Prochowa)

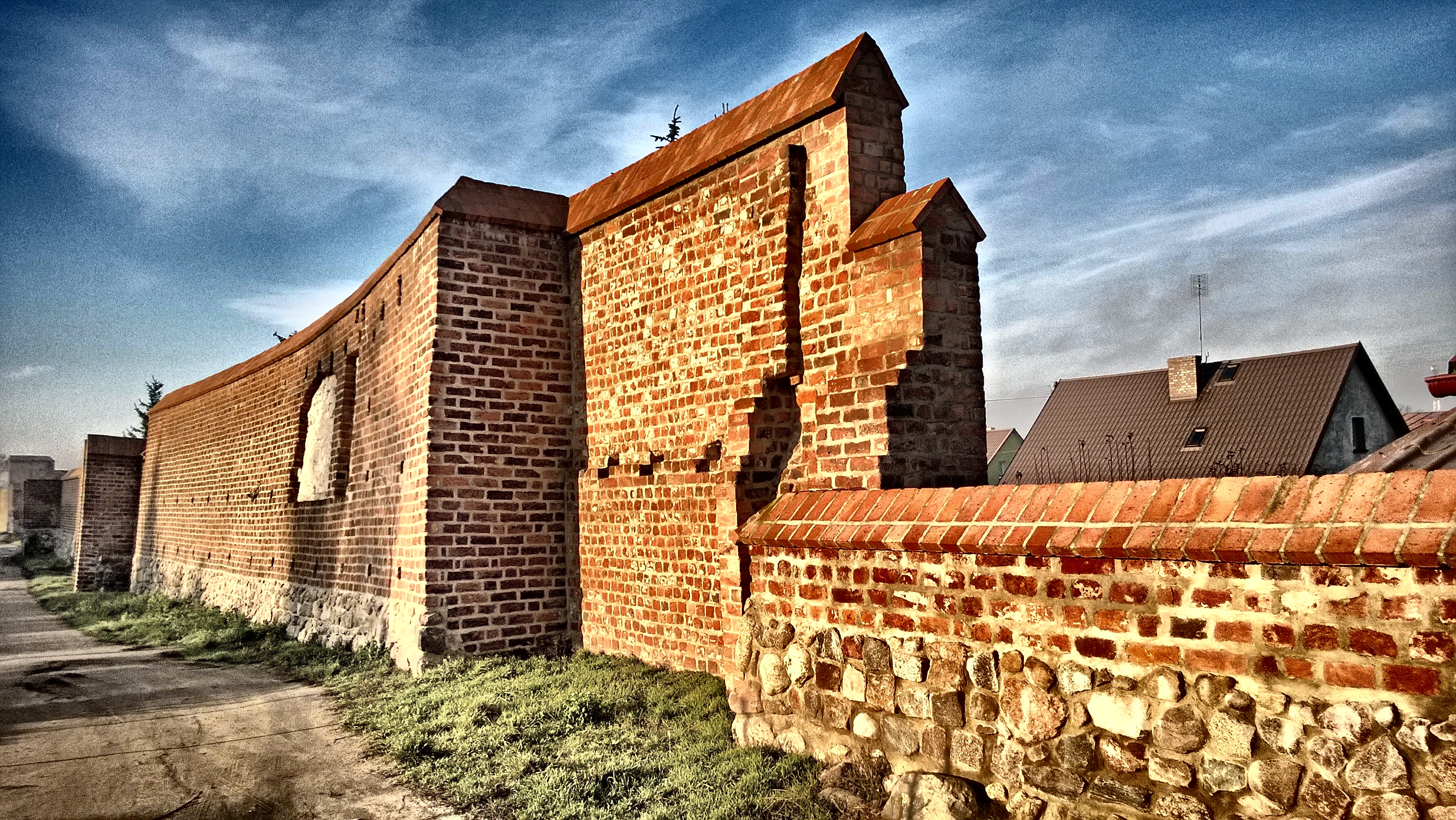
Medieval town walls

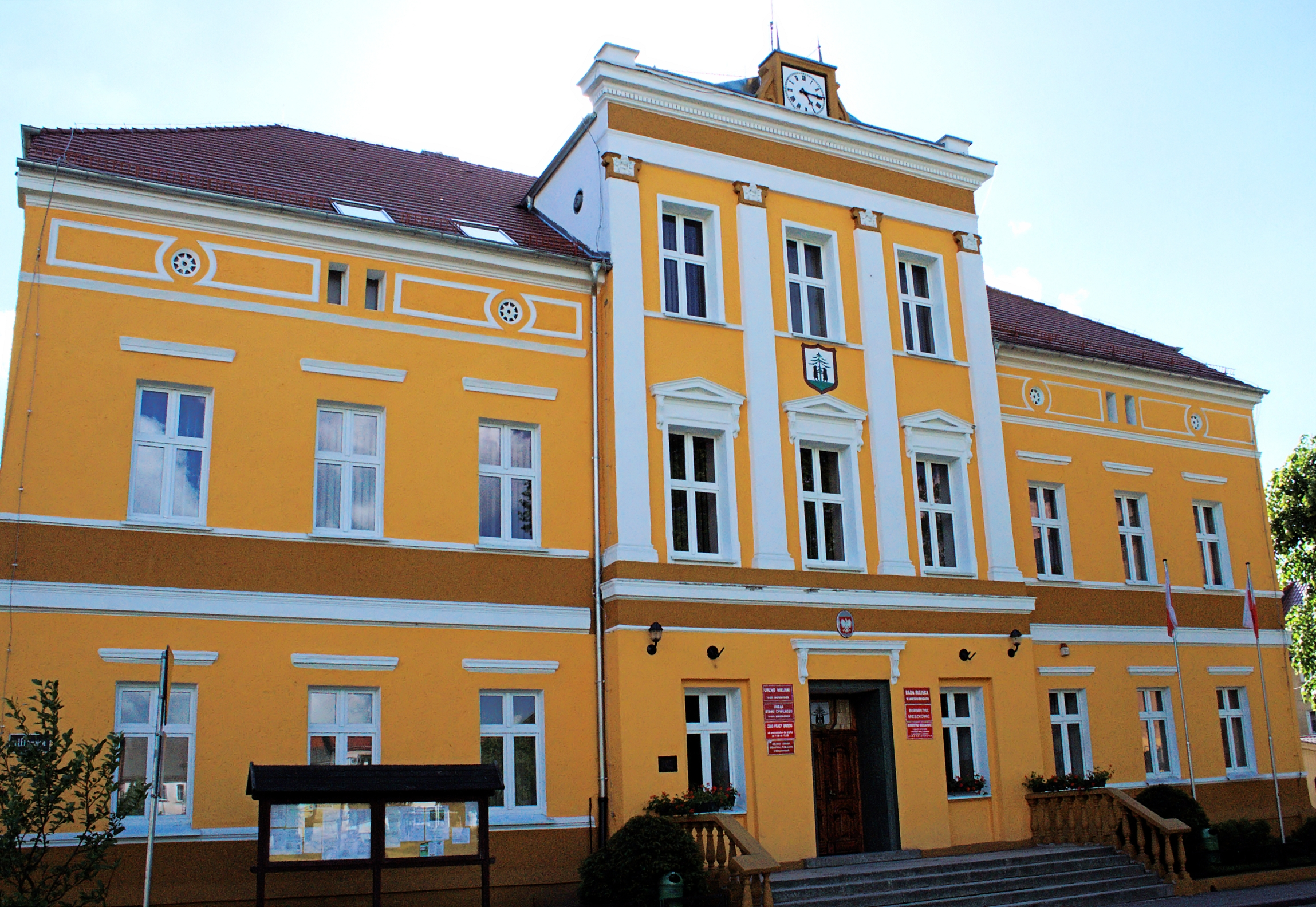
Town Hall

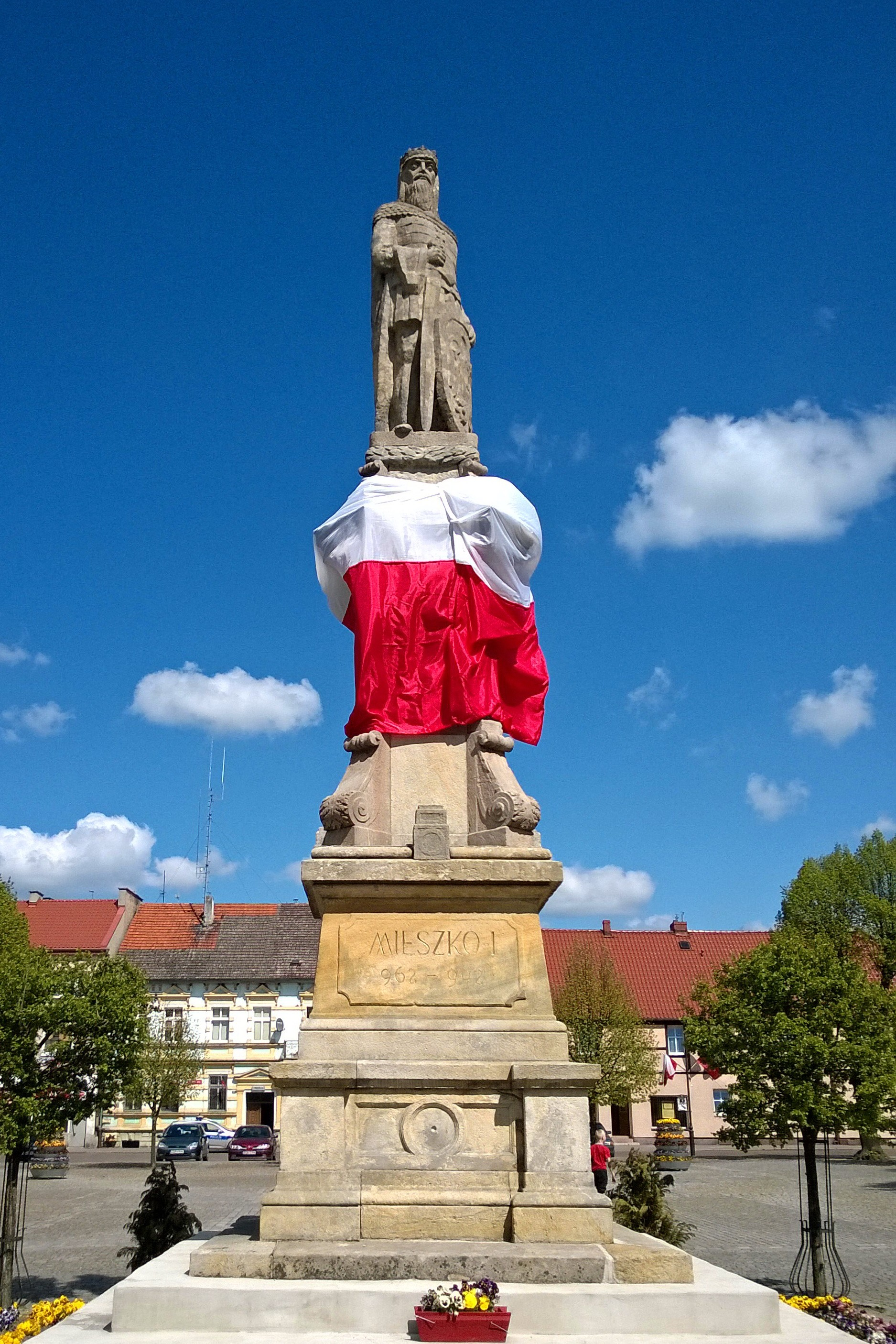
Monument of Mieszko I of Poland

Among the landmarks and sights of Mieszkowice are:

- Medieval town walls with the Powder Tower (Baszta Prochowa)
- Gothic St. Mary's Church
- Plac Wolności (Freedom Square) with the Town Hall and the monument of Mieszko I of Poland
- Dendrological garden
- Old timber framed houses

== Transport ==
Mieszkowice is located at the intersection of the Polish National road 31 and Voivodeship road 126. There is also a train station, part of the Polish railway line 273 (Wrocław–Szczecin railway).

== Notable people ==
- Waldemar, Margrave of Brandenburg-Stendal (1280–1319), a member of the House of Ascania, was Margrave of Brandenburg-Stendal from 1308 until his death in Bärwalde
- Henry II, Margrave of Brandenburg-Stendal (1308–1320) the last Margrave of Brandenburg from the House of Ascania also died in Bärwalde
- Angelika Waller (born 1944), German actress

== International relations ==
Mieszkowice is twinned with:

- Wriezen, Germany

== Sources ==
Bibliography

- Lüderitz, Jörg (2008). Die Neumark (in German) (4 ed.). Trescher Verlag. ISBN 3-89794-122-8.
- Owczarek, Małgorzata (2008). "Der piastische Gründungsmythos am Beispiel von Mieszkowice (Bärwalde)". In Bernd Vogenbeck (ed.). Terra Transoderana. Zwischen Neumark und Ziema Lubuska. Almanach (in German). Berlin: be.bra Wissenschaftsverlag. pp. 86–91. ISBN 9783937233505.
