= Nowy Folwark =

Nowy Folwark may refer to the following places in Poland:

- Nowy Folwark, Lower Silesian Voivodeship (south-west Poland)
- Nowy Folwark, Lublin Voivodeship (east Poland)
- Nowy Folwark, Świętokrzyskie Voivodeship (south-central Poland)
- Nowy Folwark, Krotoszyn County in Greater Poland Voivodeship (west-central Poland)
- Nowy Folwark, Szamotuły County in Greater Poland Voivodeship (west-central Poland)
- Nowy Folwark, Września County in Greater Poland Voivodeship (west-central Poland)
- Nowy Folwark, Silesian Voivodeship (south Poland)
- Nowy Folwark, Opole Voivodeship (south-west Poland)
- Nowy Folwark, Pomeranian Voivodeship (north Poland)
- Nowy Folwark, Bytów County in Pomeranian Voivodeship (north Poland)
- Nowy Folwark, Iława County in Warmian-Masurian Voivodeship (north Poland)
- Nowy Folwark, Ostróda County in Warmian-Masurian Voivodeship (north Poland)
