= Szaniec, Świętokrzyskie Voivodeship =

Szaniec
- Village
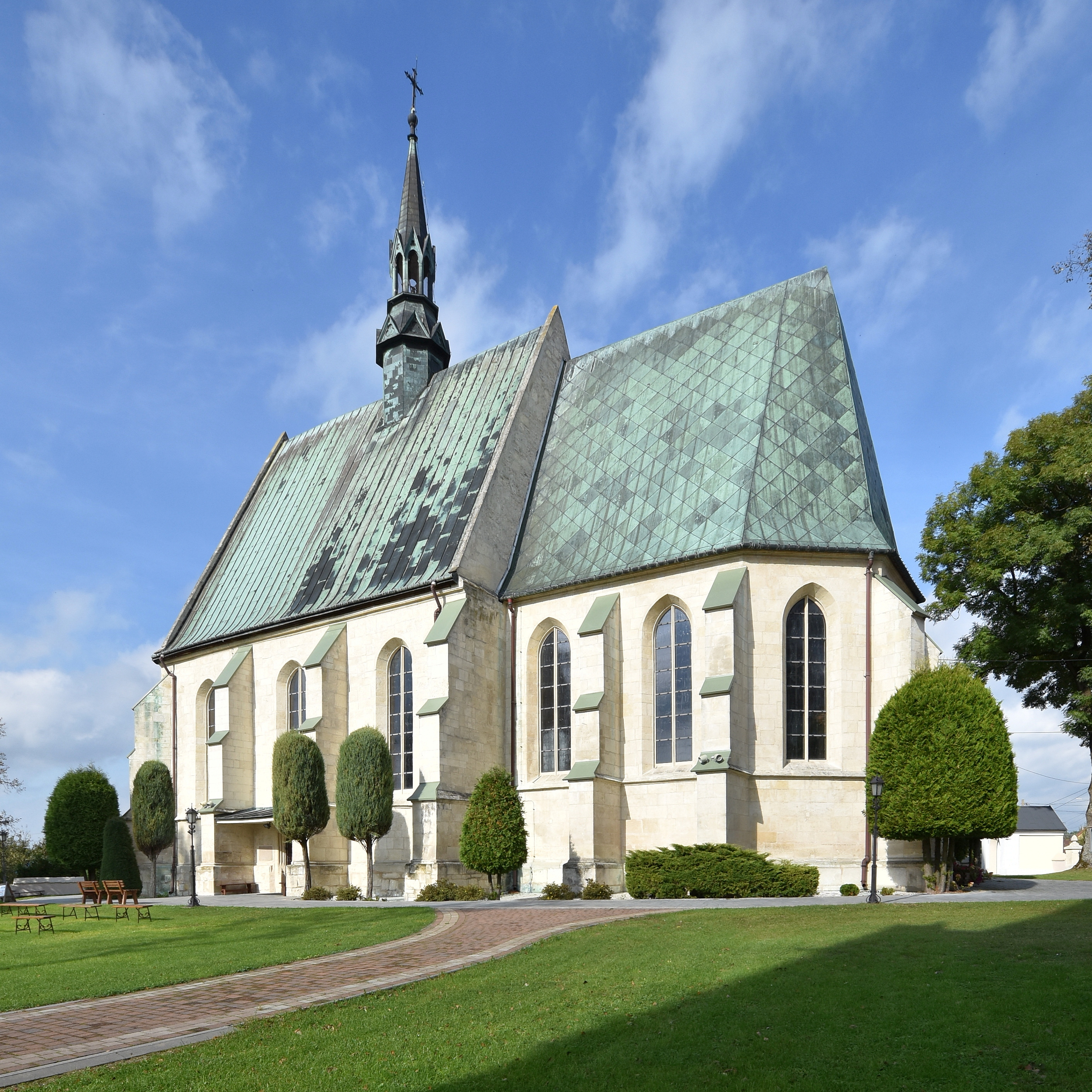
- Gothic Church of the Assumption, 2023

- Location within Poland
- Coordinates: 50°31′N 20°41′E
- Country: Poland
- Voivodeship: Świętokrzyskie
- County: Busko
- Gmina: Busko-Zdrój
- Population (approx.): 770

Szaniec [ˈʂaɲɛt͡s] is a village in the administrative district of Gmina Busko-Zdrój, within Busko County, Świętokrzyskie Voivodeship, in south-central Poland. It lies approximately 7 km (4 mi) north-west of Busko-Zdrój and 41 km (25 mi) south of the regional capital Kielce.

The village gives its name to the protected area called Szaniec Landscape Park.
