= Dobrowoda, Świętokrzyskie Voivodeship =

Dobrowoda
- Village
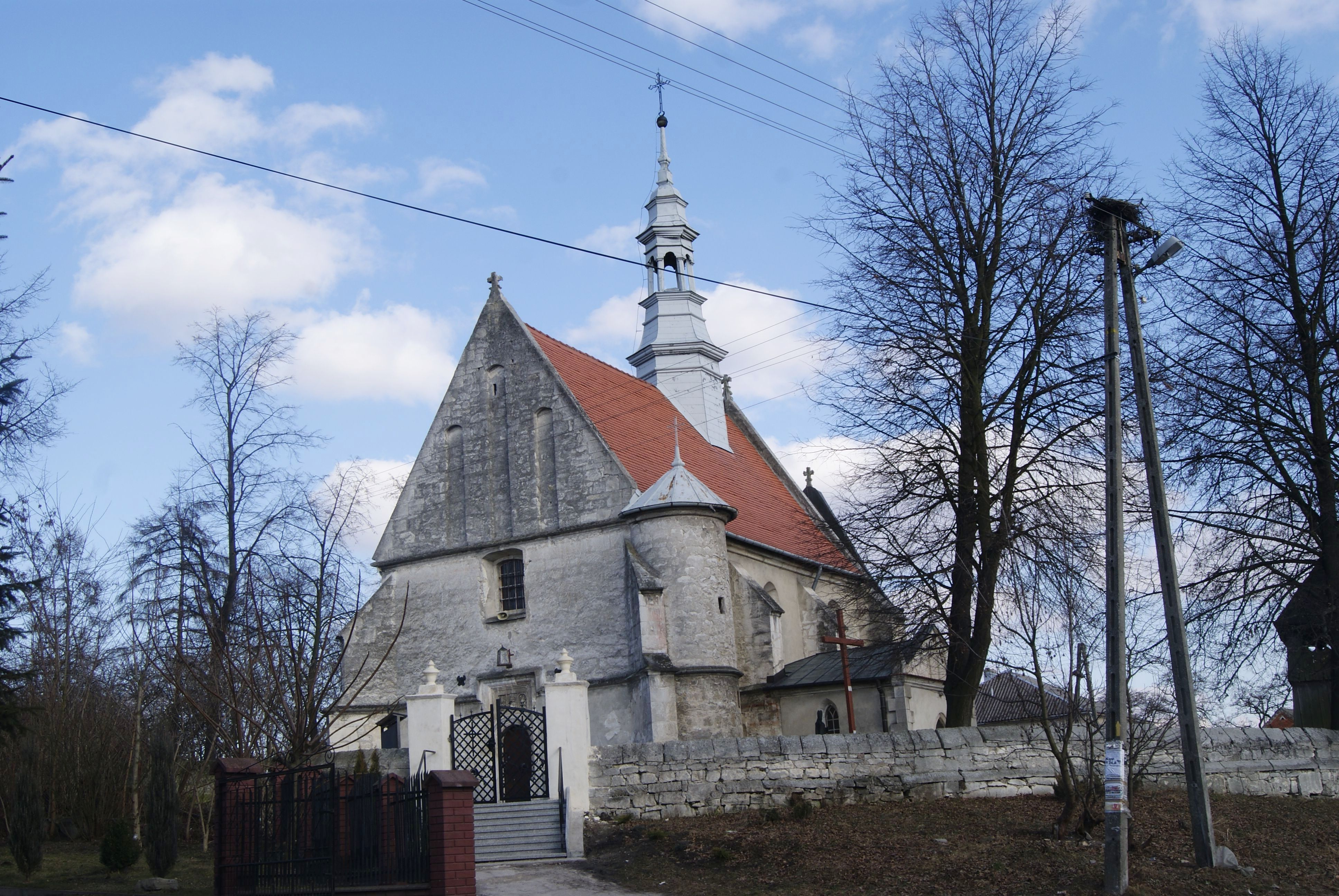
- Catholic church

- Location within Poland
- Coordinates: 50°24′N 20°46′E
- Country: Poland
- Voivodeship: Świętokrzyskie
- County: Busko
- Gmina: Busko-Zdrój
- Population: 470

Dobrowoda [dɔbrɔˈvɔda] is a village in the administrative district of Gmina Busko-Zdrój, within Busko County, Świętokrzyskie Voivodeship, in south-central Poland. It lies approximately 9 km (6 mi) south-east of Busko-Zdrój and 55 km (34 mi) south of the regional capital Kielce.
