= Mikułowice =

Mikułowice may refer to:

- Mikułowice, Busko County, a village in the administrative district of Gmina Busko-Zdrój, Busko County
- Mikułowice, Opatów County, a village in the administrative district of Gmina Wojciechowice, Opatów County
- Mikulovice (Jeseník District), a village and municipality (obec) in Jeseník District, Olomouc Region
