= Widuchowa, Świętokrzyskie Voivodeship =

Widuchowa
- Village
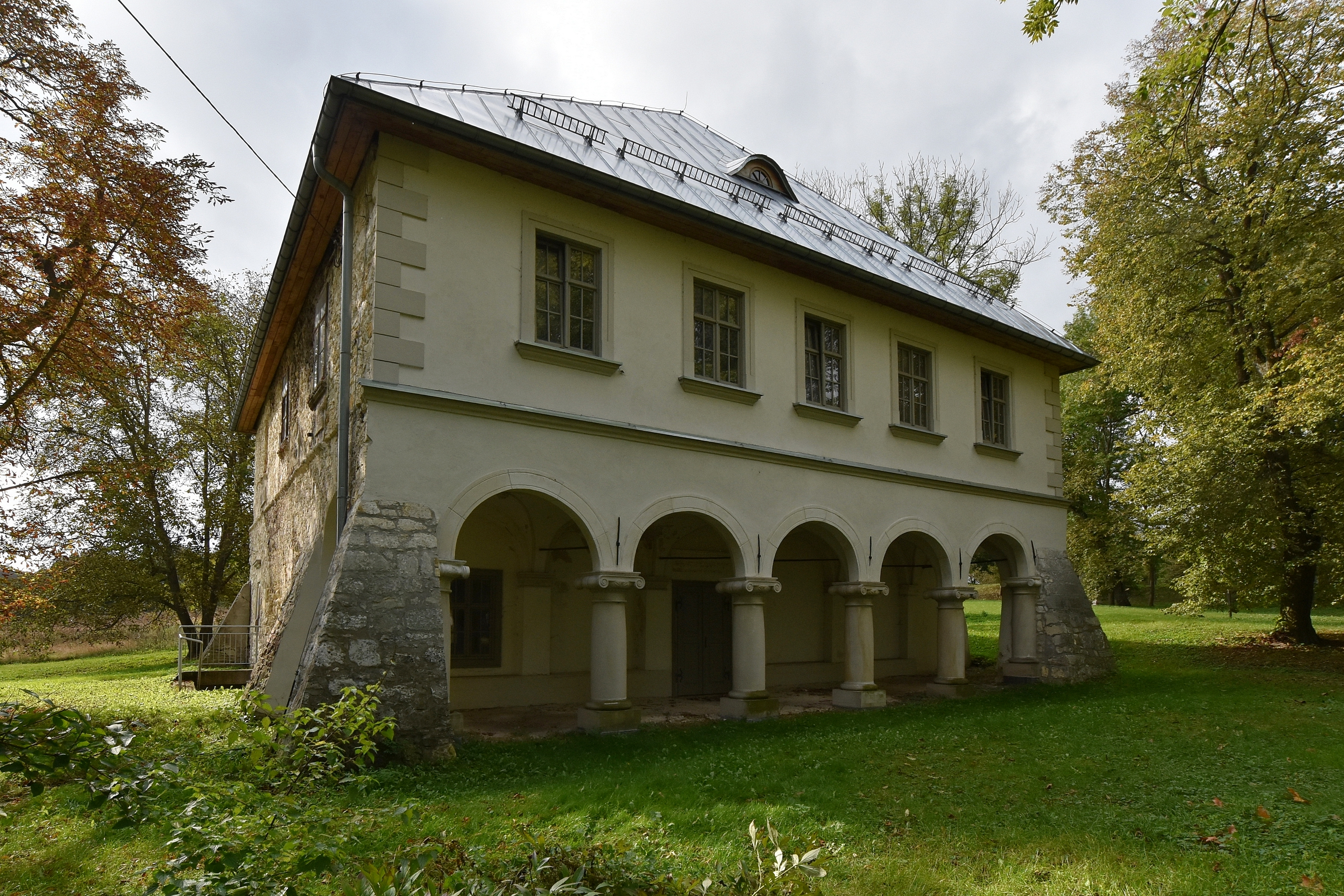
- Renaissance manor house in Widuchowa

- Location within Poland
- Coordinates: 50°28′N 20°48′E
- Country: Poland
- Voivodeship: Świętokrzyskie
- County: Busko
- Gmina: Busko-Zdrój
- Elevation: 259 m (850 ft)

Population
  - Total: 658
- Time zone: UTC+1 (CET)
  - Summer (DST): UTC+2 (CEST)
- Vehicle registration: TBU

Widuchowa [viduˈxɔva] is a village in the administrative district of Gmina Busko-Zdrój, within Busko County, Świętokrzyskie Voivodeship, in southern Poland. It lies approximately 6 km (4 mi) east of Busko-Zdrój and 49 km (30 mi) south of the regional capital Kielce.

== History ==
Within the Kingdom of Poland, Widuchowa was a private village of Polish nobility, including the Międzygórski, Mnichowski, Krupski and Szaniawski families.

As of 1827, it had a population of 418.

== Sights ==
The village contains a Renaissance manor house and a Baroque Church of Our Lady of Angels.
