= Chotelek =

- Village
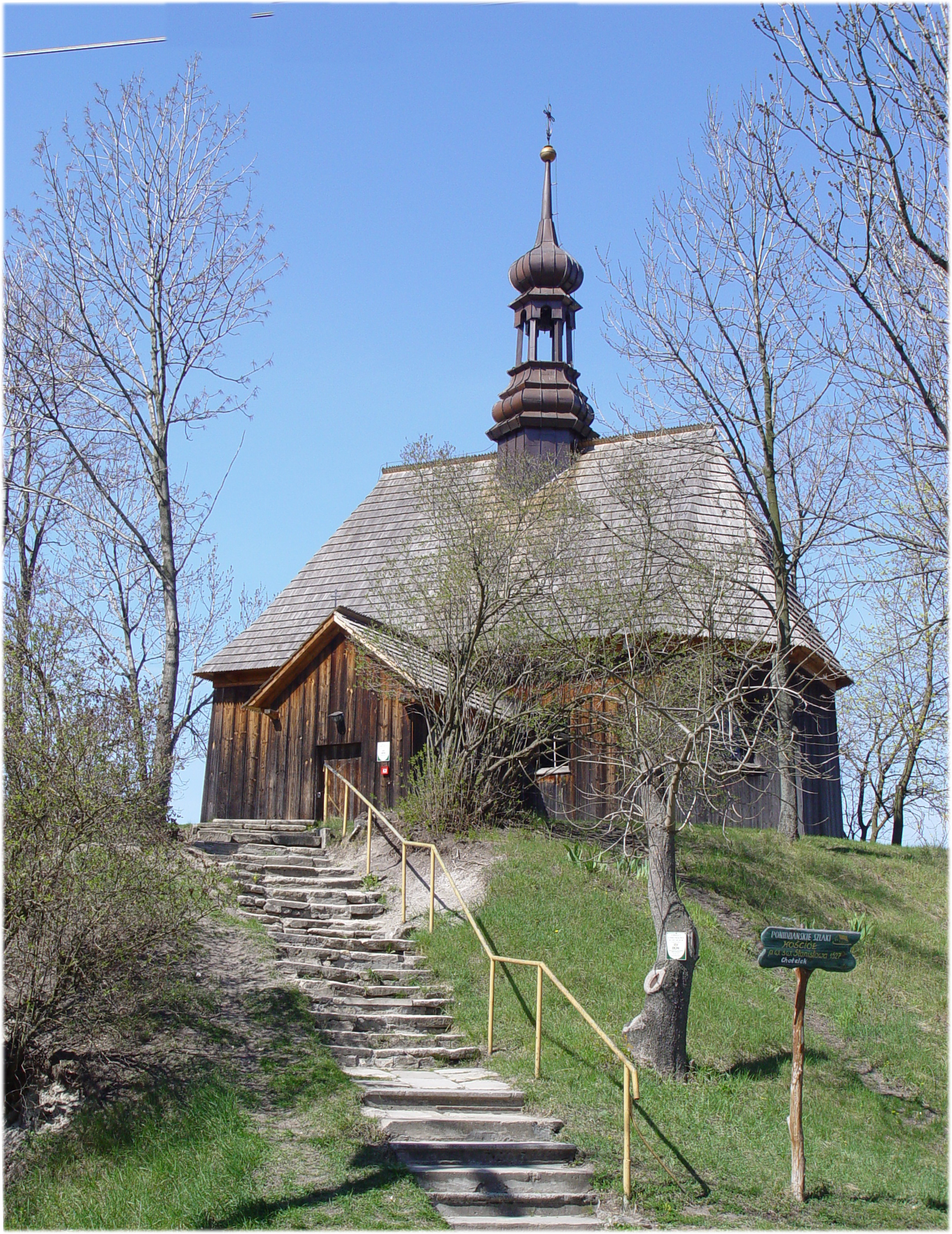
- Catholic church

- Location within Poland
- Coordinates: 50°26′N 20°41′E
- Country: Poland
- Voivodeship: Świętokrzyskie
- County: Busko
- Gmina: Busko-Zdrój
- Population: 281

Chotelek [xɔˈtɛlɛk] is a village in the administrative district of Gmina Busko-Zdrój, within Busko County, Świętokrzyskie Voivodeship, in south-central Poland. It lies approximately 5 km (3 mi) south-west of Busko-Zdrój and 51 km (32 mi) south of the regional capital Kielce.
