= Olganów =

- Village
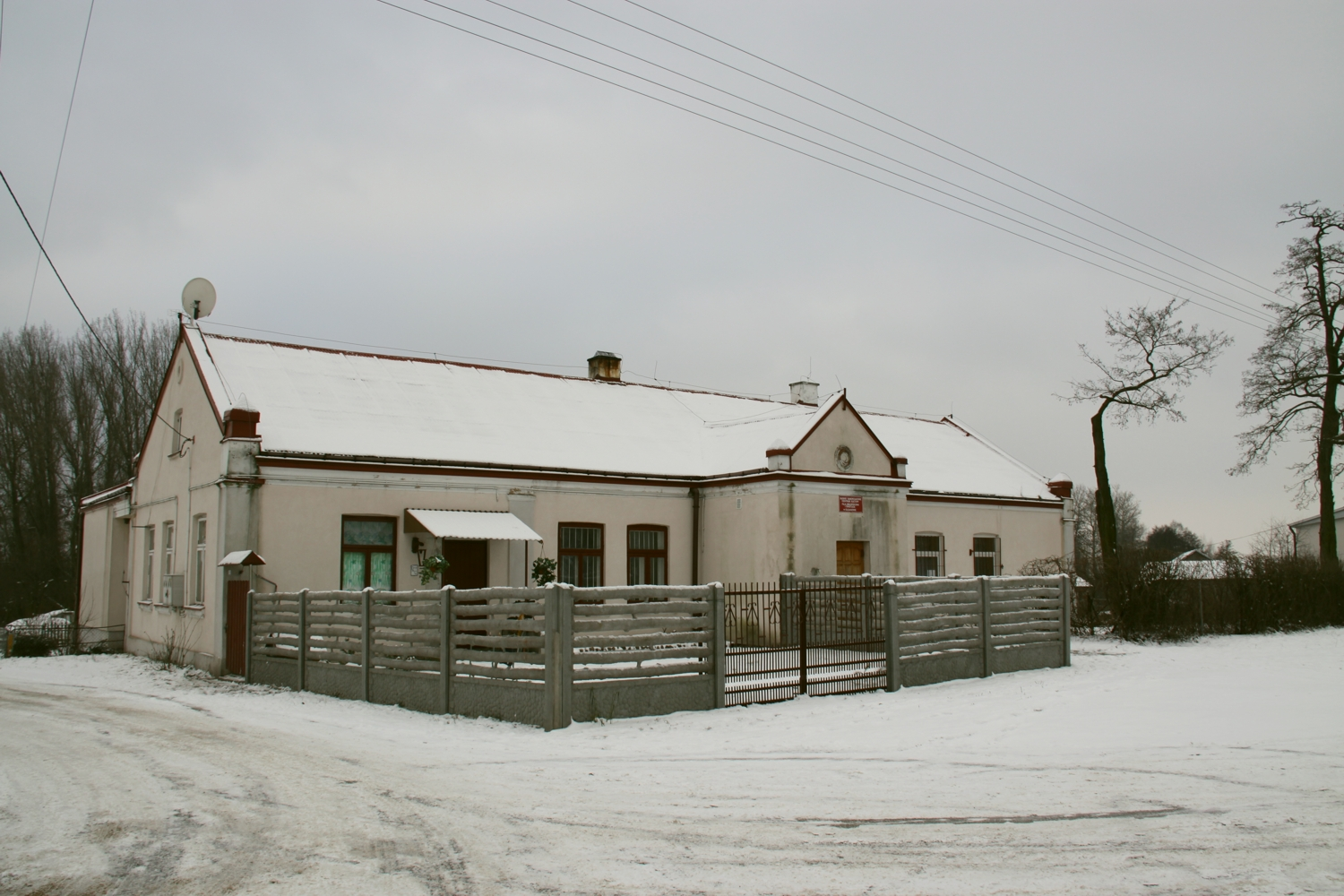

- Location within Poland
- Coordinates: 50°25′N 20°46′E
- Country: Poland
- Voivodeship: Świętokrzyskie
- County: Busko
- Gmina: Busko-Zdrój

Olganów [ɔlˈɡanuf] is a village in the administrative district of Gmina Busko-Zdrój, within Busko County, Świętokrzyskie Voivodeship, in south-central Poland. It lies approximately 7 km (4 mi) south-east of Busko-Zdrój and 53 km (33 mi) south of the regional capital Kielce.
