= Kostki Duże =

- Village
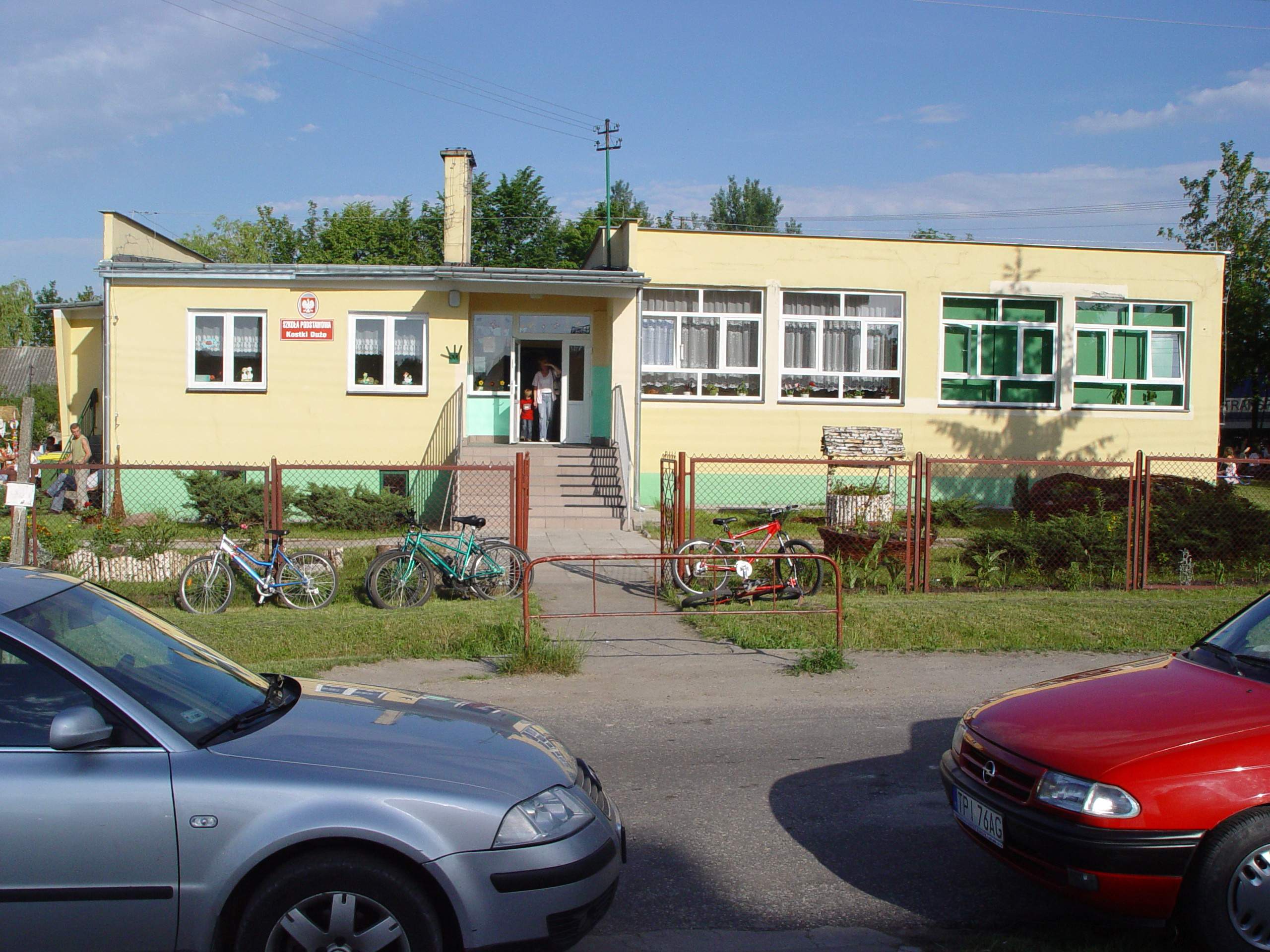

- Location within Poland
- Coordinates: 50°27′29″N 20°38′13″E
- Country: Poland
- Voivodeship: Świętokrzyskie
- County: Busko
- Gmina: Busko-Zdrój

Kostki Duże [ˈkɔstki ˈduʐɛ] is a village in the administrative district of Gmina Busko-Zdrój, within Busko County, Świętokrzyskie Voivodeship, in south-central Poland. It lies approximately 6 km (4 mi) west of Busko-Zdrój and 48 km (30 mi) south of the regional capital Kielce.
