= Owczary, Świętokrzyskie Voivodeship =

Owczary
- Village
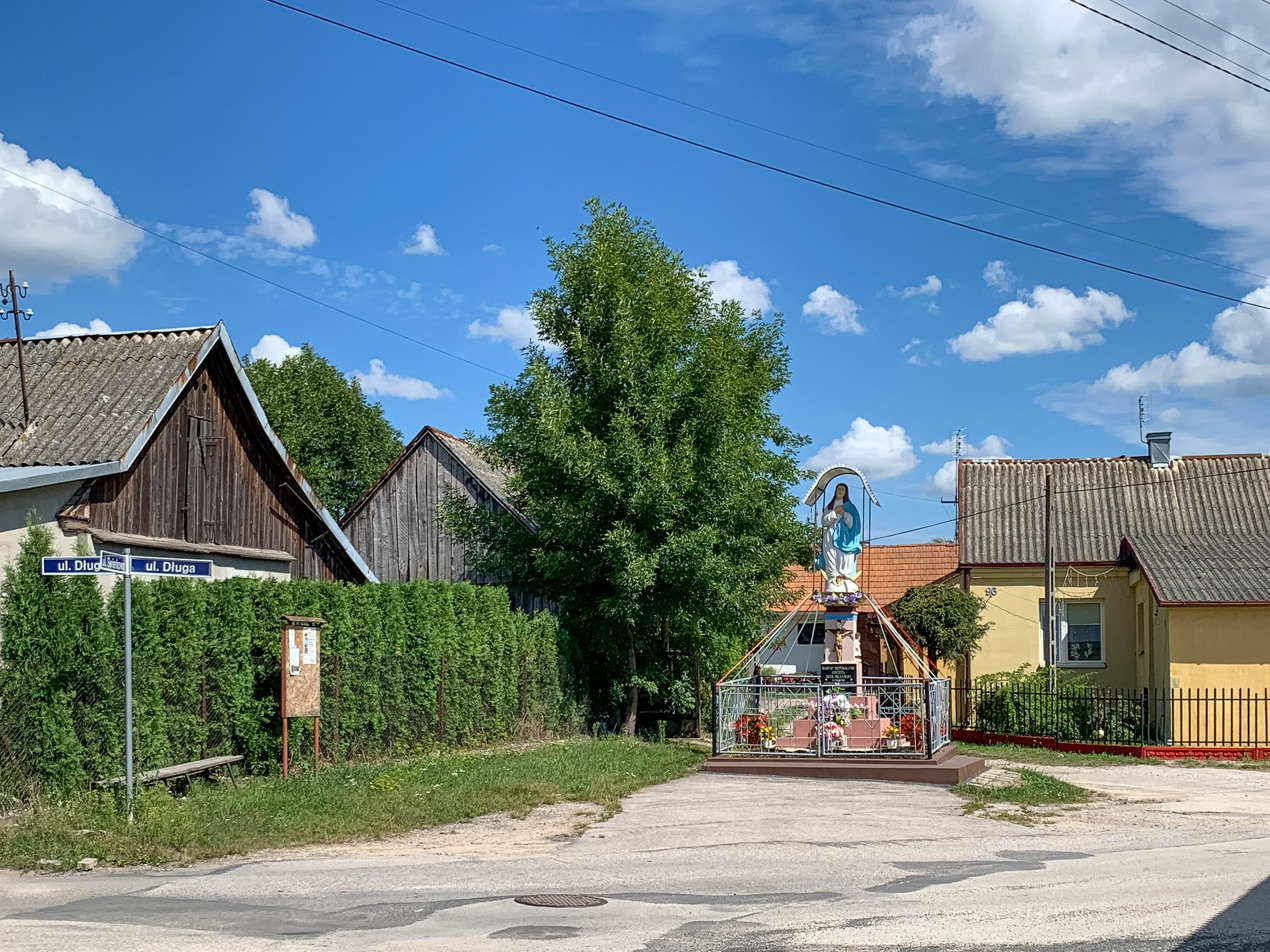

- Location within Poland
- Coordinates: 50°27′12″N 20°45′13″E
- Country: Poland
- Voivodeship: Świętokrzyskie
- County: Busko
- Gmina: Busko-Zdrój

Owczary [ɔfˈt͡ʂarɨ] is a village in the administrative district of Gmina Busko-Zdrój, within Busko County, Świętokrzyskie Voivodeship, in south-central Poland. It lies approximately 4 km (2 mi) south-east of Busko-Zdrój and 49 km (30 mi) south of the regional capital Kielce.
