= Pęczelice =

- Village
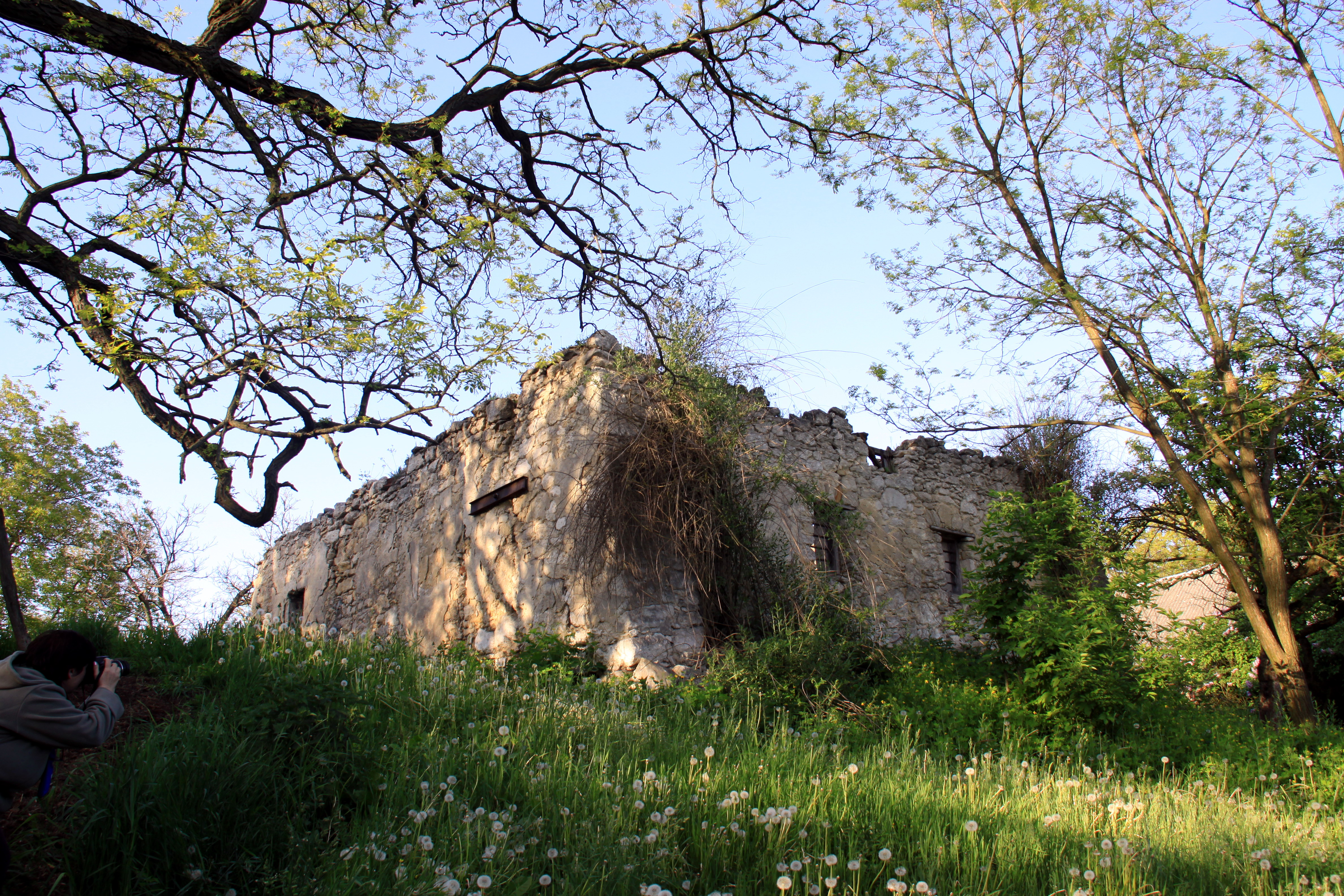
- Pęczelice - walls of the arian house (16th century).

- Location within Poland
- Coordinates: 50°27′N 20°47′E
- Country: Poland
- Voivodeship: Świętokrzyskie
- County: Busko
- Gmina: Busko-Zdrój

Pęczelice [pɛnt͡ʂɛˈlit͡sɛ] is a village in the administrative district of Gmina Busko-Zdrój, within Busko County, Świętokrzyskie Voivodeship, in south-central Poland. It lies approximately 6 km (4 mi) east of Busko-Zdrój and 50 km (31 mi) south of the regional capital Kielce.
