= Las Winiarski =

- Village
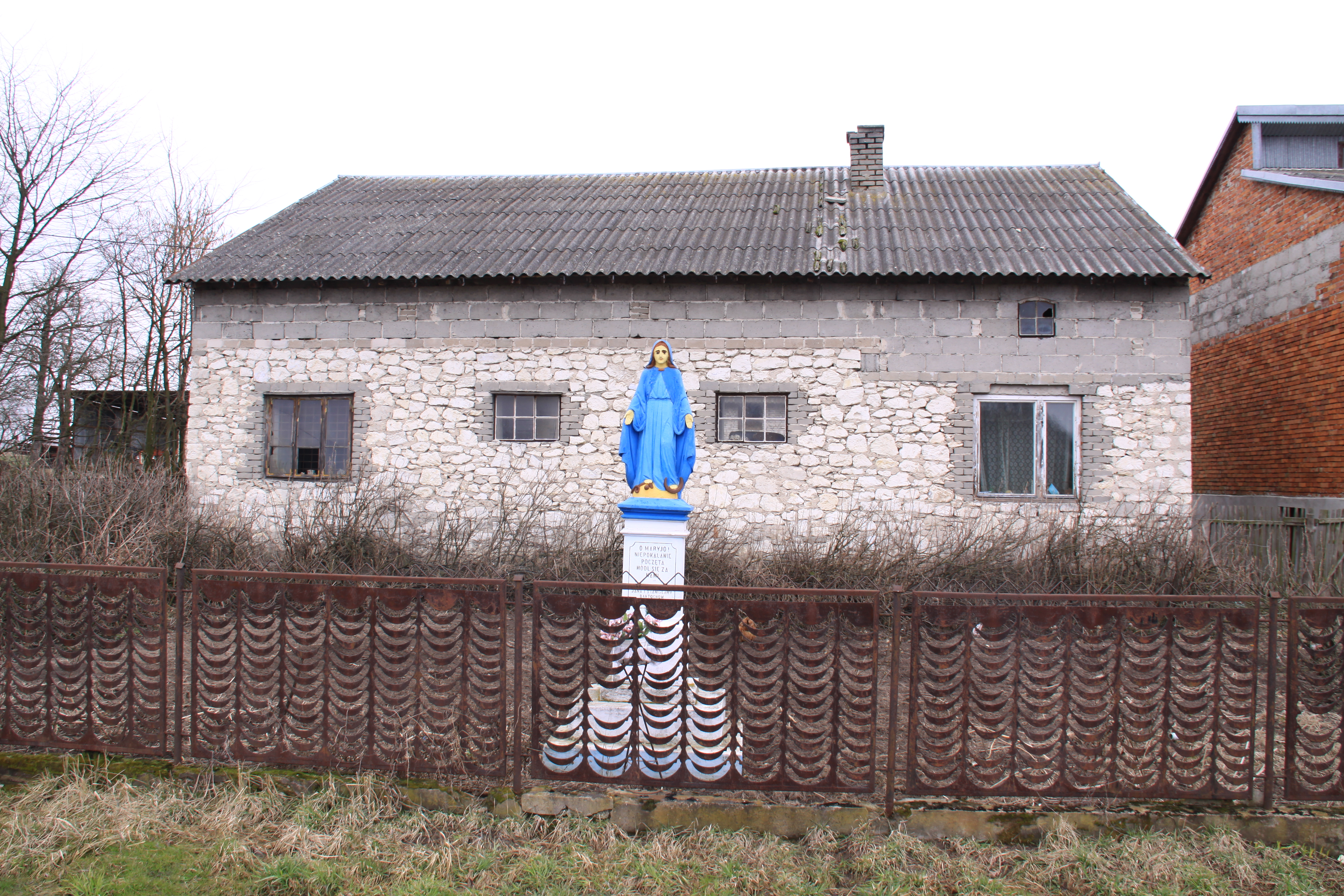
- Figure of the Blessed Virgin Mary

- Location within Poland
- Coordinates: 50°29′16″N 20°38′54″E
- Country: Poland
- Voivodeship: Świętokrzyskie
- County: Busko
- Gmina: Busko-Zdrój

Las Winiarski [ˈlas viˈɲarski] is a village in the administrative district of Gmina Busko-Zdrój, within Busko County, Świętokrzyskie Voivodeship, in south-central Poland. It lies approximately 6 km (4 mi) north-west of Busko-Zdrój and 44 km (27 mi) south of the regional capital Kielce.
