= Wełecz =

- Village
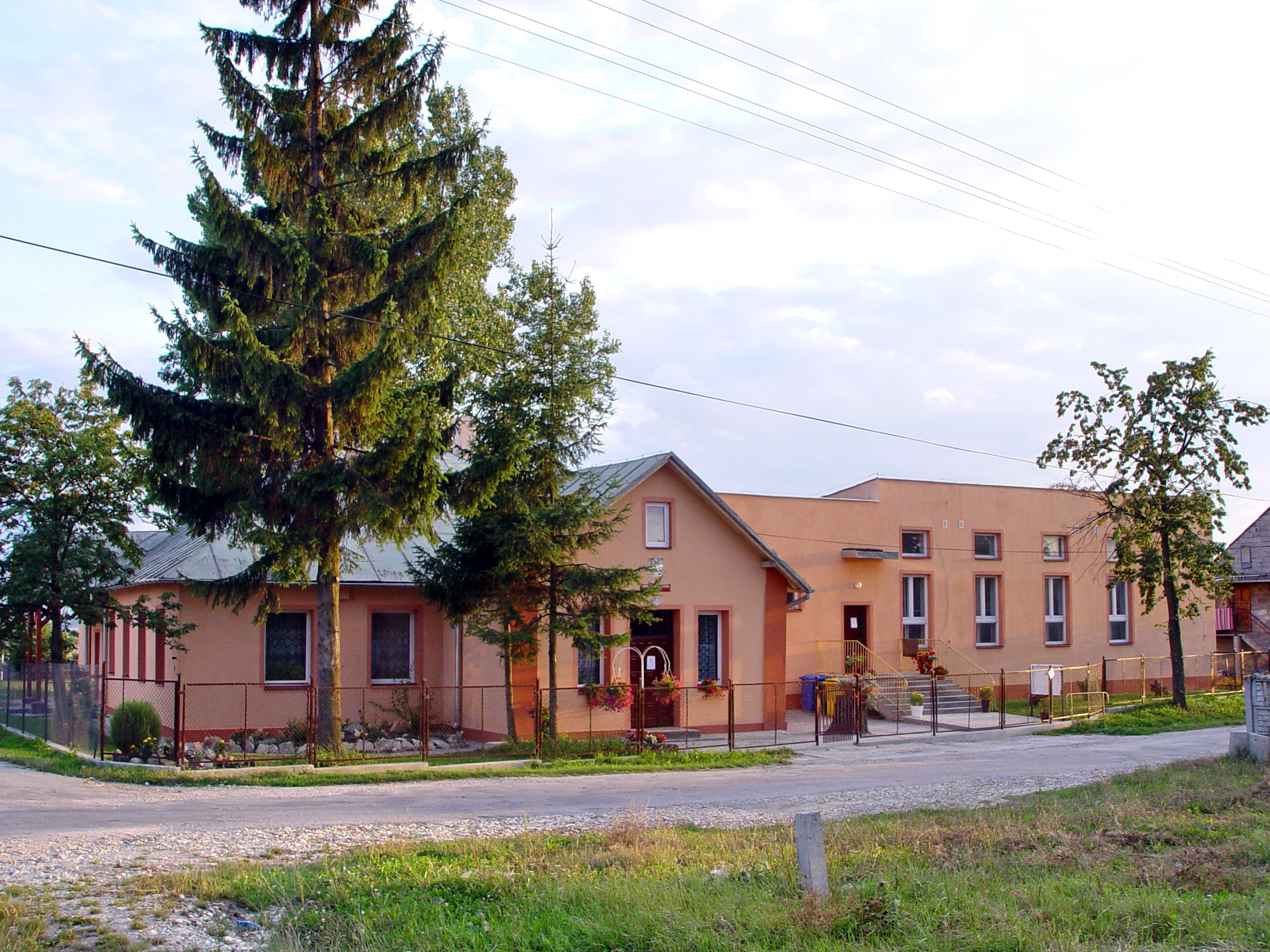
- School

- Location within Poland
- Coordinates: 50°28′9″N 20°41′3″E
- Country: Poland
- Voivodeship: Świętokrzyskie
- County: Busko
- Gmina: Busko-Zdrój
- Population: 560

Wełecz [ˈvɛwɛt͡ʂ] is a village in the administrative district of Gmina Busko-Zdrój, within Busko County, Świętokrzyskie Voivodeship, in south-central Poland. It lies approximately 3 km (2 mi) west of Busko-Zdrój and 47 km (29 mi) south of the regional capital Kielce.
