= Podgaje, Busko County =

Podgaje
- Village
- Location within Poland
- Coordinates: 50°30′26″N 20°46′41″E
- Country: Poland
- Voivodeship: Świętokrzyskie
- County: Busko
- Gmina: Busko-Zdrój

Podgaje [pɔdˈɡajɛ] is a village in the administrative district of Gmina Busko-Zdrój, within Busko County, Świętokrzyskie Voivodeship, in south-central Poland. It lies approximately 7 km (4 mi) north-east of Busko-Zdrój and 44 km (27 mi) south of the regional capital Kielce.
