= Młyny =

Młyny may refer to the following places:

- Młyny, Kuyavian-Pomeranian Voivodeship (north-central Poland)
- Młyny, Subcarpathian Voivodeship (south-east Poland)
- Młyny, Świętokrzyskie Voivodeship (south-central Poland)
- Młyny, Opole Voivodeship (south-west Poland)
- Młyny, West Pomeranian Voivodeship (north-west Poland)

== See also ==
- Młyny Piekarskie, a village in Greater Poland Voivodeship (west-central Poland)
- Mlyny (disambiguation)
