= Bilczów =

- Village
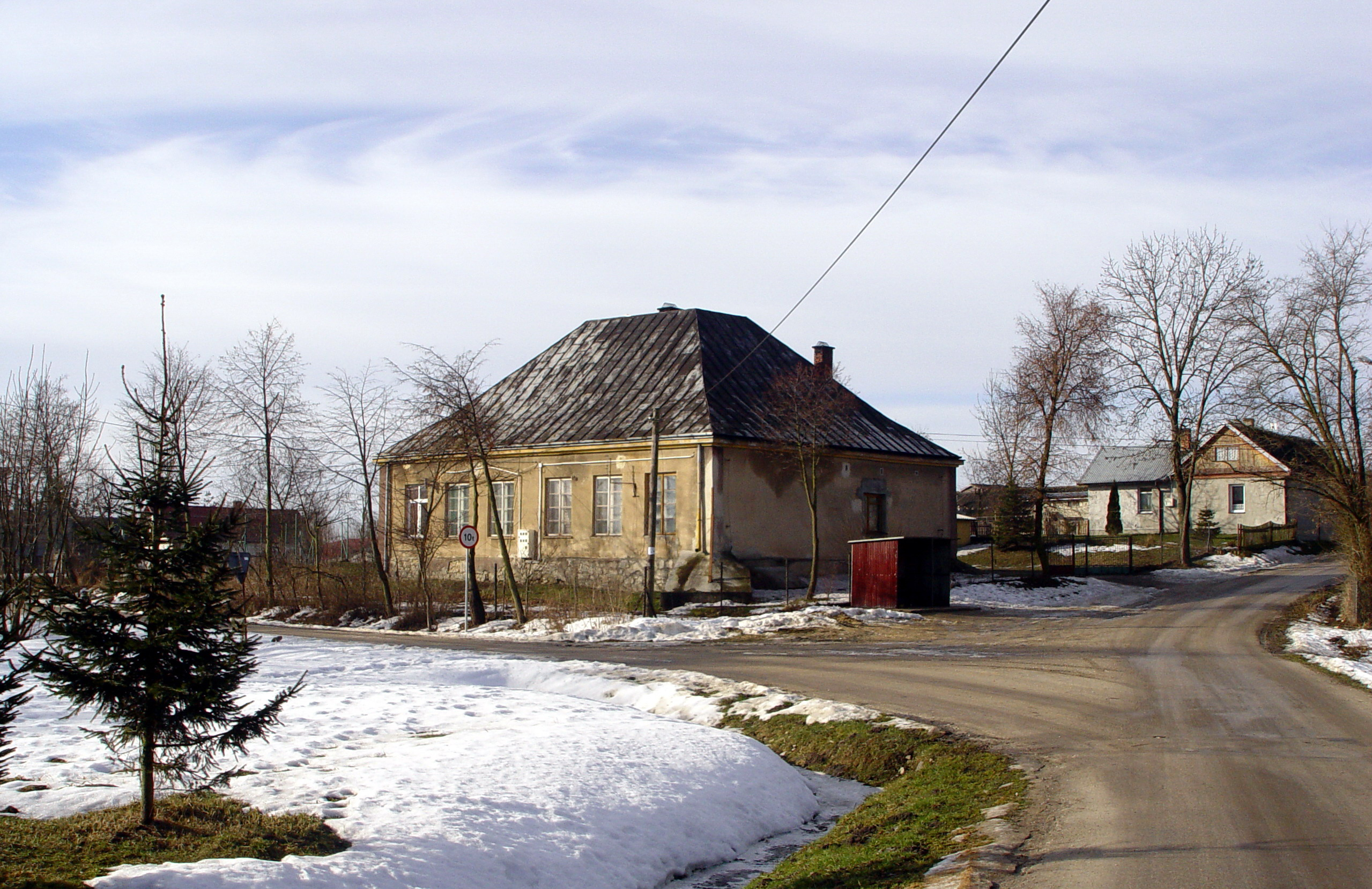

- Location within Poland
- Coordinates: 50°24′N 20°44′E
- Country: Poland
- Voivodeship: Świętokrzyskie
- County: Busko
- Gmina: Busko-Zdrój

Bilczów [ˈbilt͡ʂuf] is a village in the administrative district of Gmina Busko-Zdrój, within Busko County, Świętokrzyskie Voivodeship, in south-central Poland. It lies approximately 8 km (5 mi) south of Busko-Zdrój and 55 km (34 mi) south of the regional capital Kielce.
