= Janina, Świętokrzyskie Voivodeship =

Janina
- Village
- Location within Poland
- Coordinates: 50°30′N 20°49′E
- Country: Poland
- Voivodeship: Świętokrzyskie
- County: Busko
- Gmina: Busko-Zdrój
- Elevation: 220 m (720 ft)
- Population: 450

Janina [jaˈnina] is a village in the administrative district of Gmina Busko-Zdrój, within Busko County, Świętokrzyskie Voivodeship, in south-central Poland. It lies approximately 8 km (5 mi) north-east of Busko-Zdrój and 45 km (28 mi) south of the regional capital Kielce.
