= Marek Sikora =

Marek Sikora may refer to:

- Marek Sikora (actor) (1959–1996), Polish film actor and theatre director
- Marek Sikora (astronomer), Polish astronomer
- Marek Sikora (ice hockey) (born 1986), Czech ice hockey player
