= Łagiewniki, Busko County =

Łagiewniki
- Village
- Location within Poland
- Coordinates: 50°29′9″N 20°44′53″E
- Country: Poland
- Voivodeship: Świętokrzyskie
- County: Busko
- Gmina: Busko-Zdrój

Łagiewniki [waɡʲɛvˈniki] is a village in the administrative district of Gmina Busko-Zdrój, within Busko County, Świętokrzyskie Voivodeship, in south-central Poland. It lies approximately 4 km (2 mi) north-east of Busko-Zdrój and 46 km (29 mi) south of the regional capital Kielce.
