= Zbludowice =

- Village
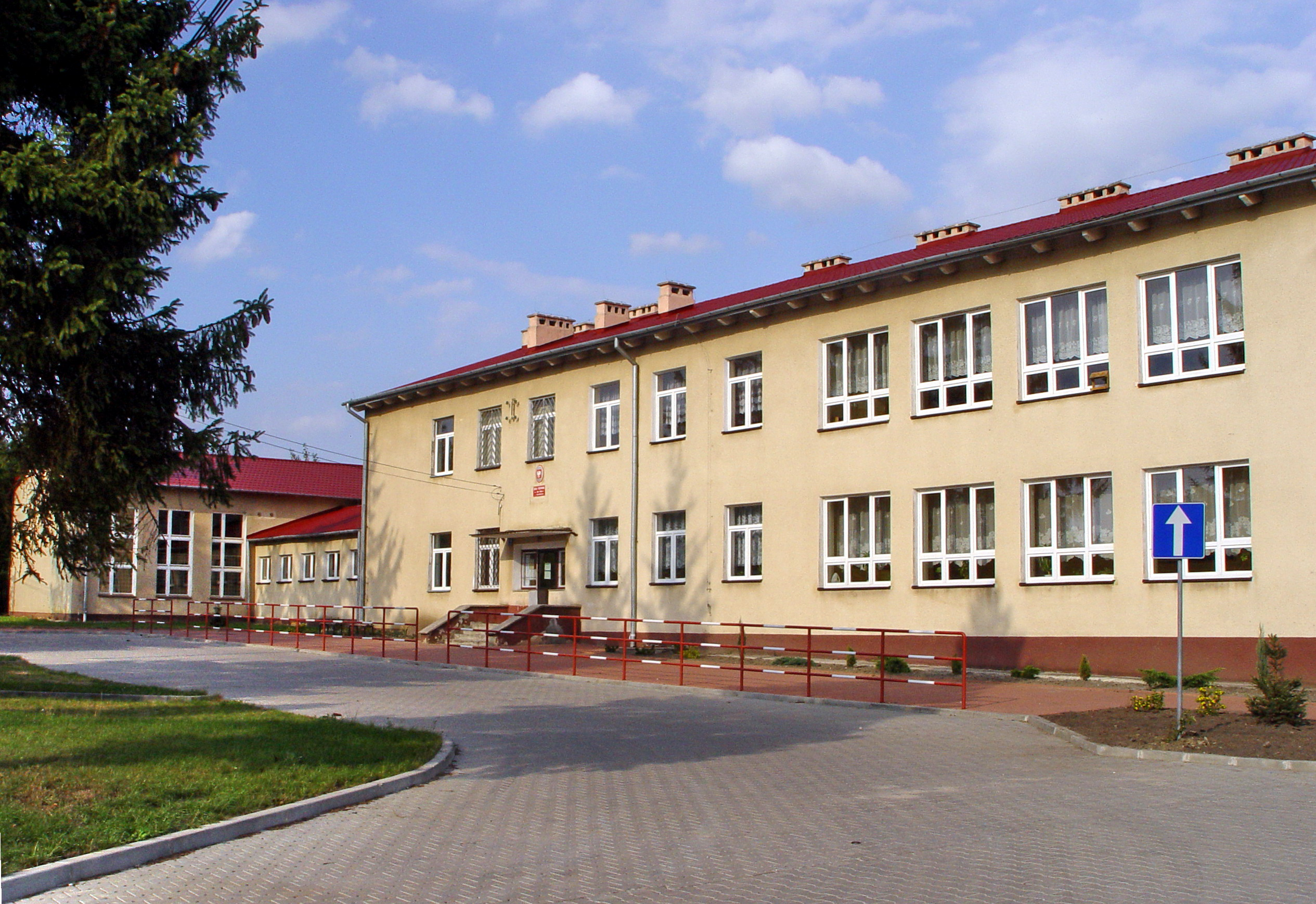
- School

- Location within Poland
- Coordinates: 50°26′48″N 20°43′36″E
- Country: Poland
- Voivodeship: Świętokrzyskie
- County: Busko
- Gmina: Busko-Zdrój
- Population: 1,108

Zbludowice [zbludɔˈvit͡sɛ] is a village in the administrative district of Gmina Busko-Zdrój, within Busko County, Świętokrzyskie Voivodeship, in south-central Poland. It lies approximately 3 km (2 mi) south of Busko-Zdrój and 50 km (31 mi) south of the regional capital Kielce.
