= Skotniki Duże =

- Village
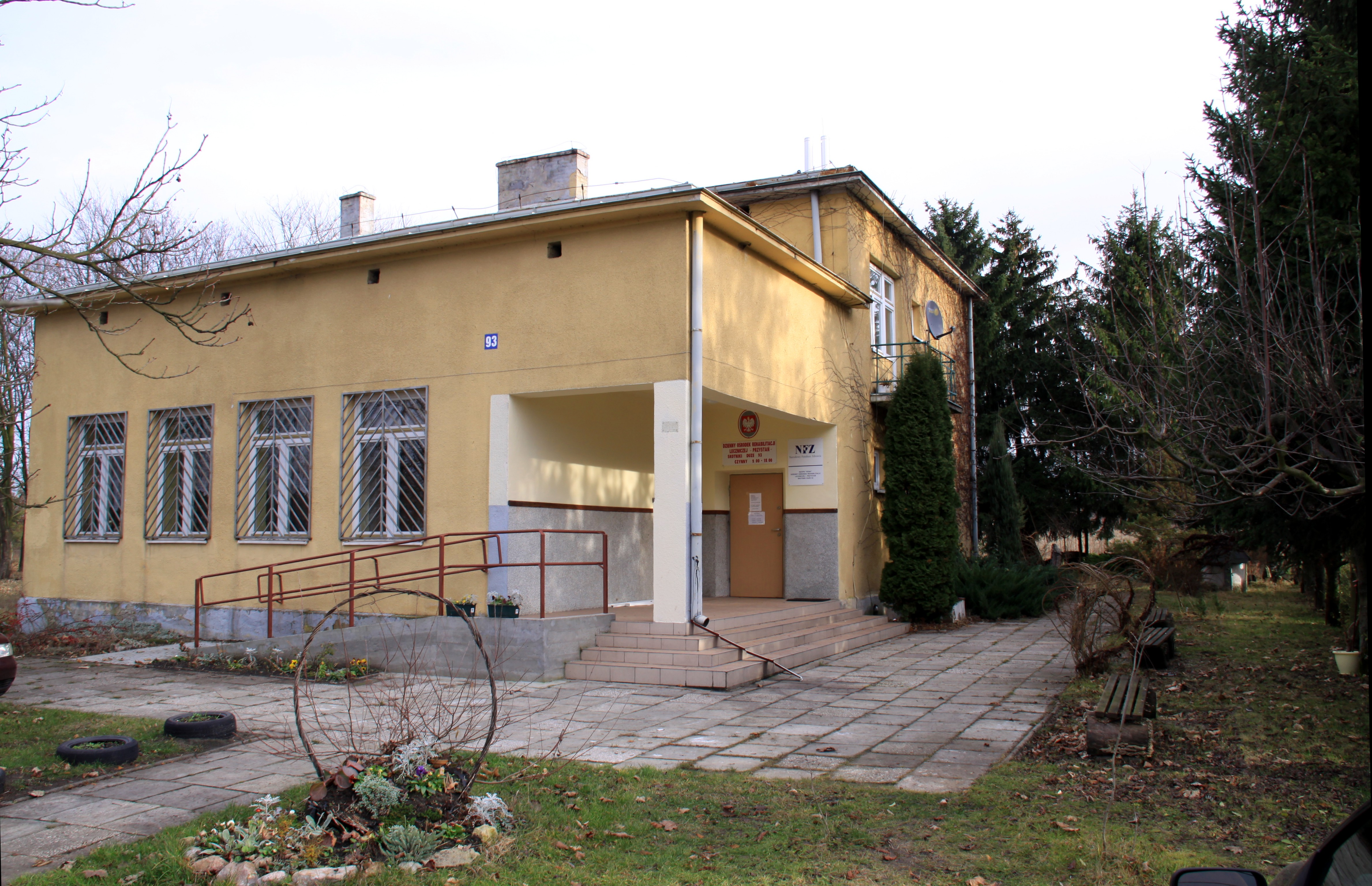

- Location within Poland
- Coordinates: 50°26′5″N 20°47′32″E
- Country: Poland
- Voivodeship: Świętokrzyskie
- County: Busko
- Gmina: Busko-Zdrój

Skotniki Duże [skɔtˈniki ˈduʐɛ] is a village in the administrative district of Gmina Busko-Zdrój, within Busko County, Świętokrzyskie Voivodeship, in south-central Poland. It lies approximately 7 km (4 mi) south-east of Busko-Zdrój and 52 km (32 mi) south of the regional capital Kielce.
