= Kołaczkowice =

Kołaczkowice may refer to the following places:

- Kołaczkowice, Greater Poland Voivodeship (west-central Poland)
- Kołaczkowice, Silesian Voivodeship (south Poland)
- Kołaczkowice, Świętokrzyskie Voivodeship (south-central Poland)
