= Budzyń, Świętokrzyskie Voivodeship =

Budzyń
- Village
- Location within Poland
- Coordinates: 50°23′2″N 20°46′2″E
- Country: Poland
- Voivodeship: Świętokrzyskie
- County: Busko
- Gmina: Busko-Zdrój

Budzyń [ˈbud͡zɨɲ] is a village in the administrative district of Gmina Busko-Zdrój, within Busko County, Świętokrzyskie Voivodeship, in south-central Poland. It lies approximately 10 km (6 mi) south of Busko-Zdrój and 57 km (35 mi) south of the regional capital Kielce.
