= Radzanów =

Radzanów may refer to the following places:

- Radzanów, Lublin Voivodeship (east Poland)
- Radzanów, Białobrzegi County in Masovian Voivodeship (east-central Poland)
- Radzanów, Świętokrzyskie Voivodeship (south-central Poland)
- Radzanów, Mława County in Masovian Voivodeship (east-central Poland)
