= Kawczyce =

- Village
- Location within Poland
- Coordinates: 50°25′50″N 20°42′22″E
- Country: Poland
- Voivodeship: Świętokrzyskie
- County: Busko
- Gmina: Busko-Zdrój

Kawczyce [kafˈt͡ʂɨt͡sɛ] is a village in the administrative district of Gmina Busko-Zdrój, within Busko County, Świętokrzyskie Voivodeship, in south-central Poland. It lies approximately 5 km (3 mi) south of Busko-Zdrój and 51 km (32 mi) south of the regional capital Kielce.
