= Skorzów =

- Village
- Location within Poland
- Coordinates: 50°32′N 20°45′E
- Country: Poland
- Voivodeship: Świętokrzyskie
- County: Busko
- Gmina: Busko-Zdrój

Skorzów [ˈskɔʐuf] is a village in the administrative district of Gmina Busko-Zdrój, within Busko County, Świętokrzyskie Voivodeship, in south-central Poland. It lies approximately 8 km (5 mi) north of Busko-Zdrój and 40 km (25 mi) south of the regional capital Kielce.
