= Elżbiecin =

Elżbiecin may refer to the following places:

- Elżbiecin, Kuyavian-Pomeranian Voivodeship (north-central Poland)
- Elżbiecin, Gmina Kodeń, Biała County in Lublin Voivodeship (east Poland)
- Elżbiecin, Chełm County in Lublin Voivodeship (east Poland)
- Elżbiecin, Grajewo County in Podlaskie Voivodeship (north-east Poland)
- Elżbiecin, Łomża County in Podlaskie Voivodeship (north-east Poland)
- Elżbiecin, Świętokrzyskie Voivodeship (south-central Poland)
- Elżbiecin, Ciechanów County in Masovian Voivodeship (east-central Poland)
- Elżbiecin, Gmina Krasnosielc in Masovian Voivodeship (east-central Poland)
- Elżbiecin, Żuromin County in Masovian Voivodeship (east-central Poland)
- Elżbiecin, Greater Poland Voivodeship (west-central Poland)
- Elżbiecin, Warmian-Masurian Voivodeship (north Poland)
