= Zwierzyniec, Świętokrzyskie Voivodeship =

Zwierzyniec
- Village
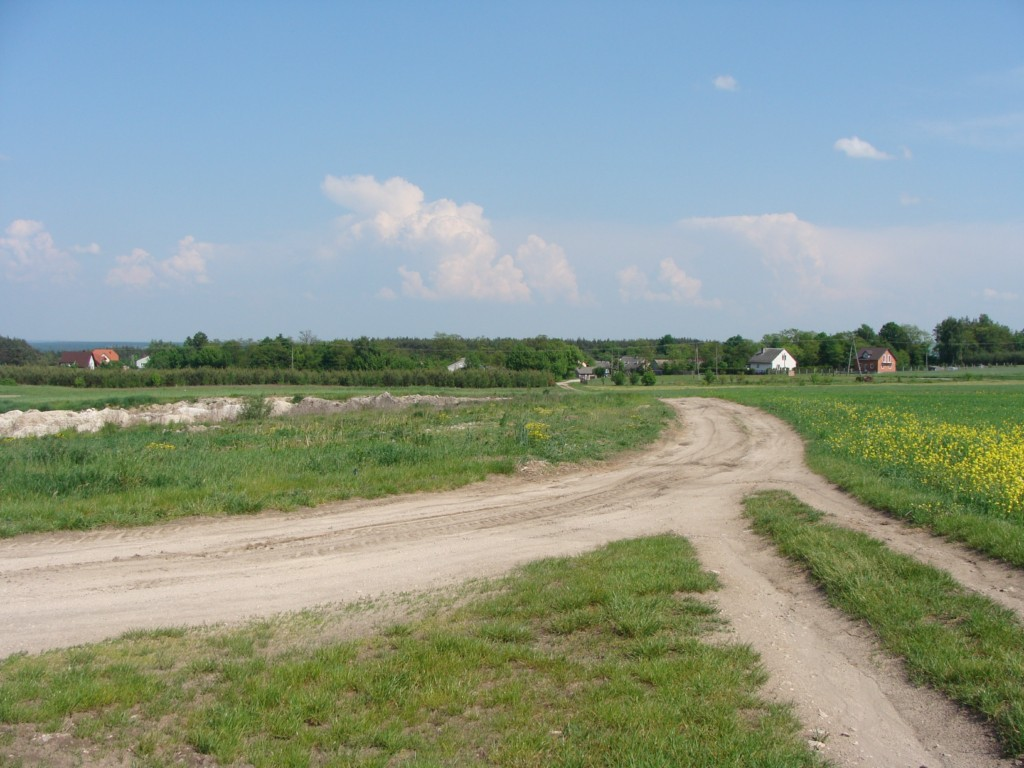

- Location within Poland
- Coordinates: 50°30′46″N 20°42′43″E
- Country: Poland
- Voivodeship: Świętokrzyskie
- County: Busko
- Gmina: Busko-Zdrój
- Population: 115

Zwierzyniec (Polish pronunciation: [zvjɛˈʐɨɲɛt͡s]) is a village in the administrative district of Gmina Busko-Zdrój, within Busko County, Świętokrzyskie Voivodeship, in south-central Poland. It lies approximately 6 km (4 mi) north of Busko-Zdrój and 42 km (26 mi) south of the regional capital Kielce.
