= Skotniki Małe =

- Village
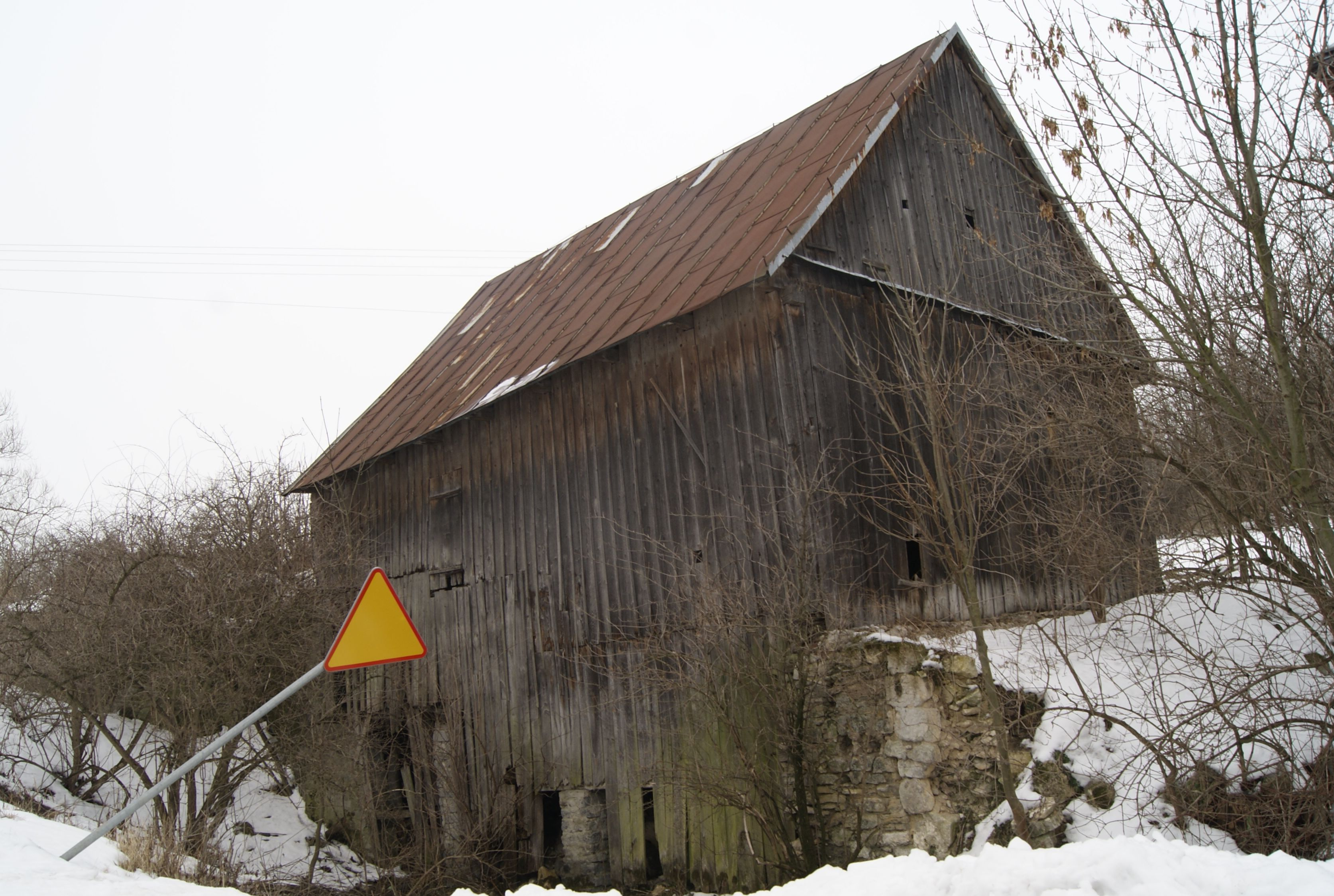
- Watermill

- Location within Poland
- Coordinates: 50°25′59″N 20°46′48″E
- Country: Poland
- Voivodeship: Świętokrzyskie
- County: Busko
- Gmina: Busko-Zdrój

Skotniki Małe [skɔtˈniki ˈmawɛ] is a village in the administrative district of Gmina Busko-Zdrój, within Busko County, Świętokrzyskie Voivodeship, in south-central Poland. It lies approximately 6 km (4 mi) south-east of Busko-Zdrój and 52 km (32 mi) south of the regional capital Kielce.
