= Wolica, Gmina Busko-Zdrój =

Wolica
- Village
- Location within Poland
- Coordinates: 50°26′2″N 20°42′48″E
- Country: Poland
- Voivodeship: Świętokrzyskie
- County: Busko
- Gmina: Busko-Zdrój

Wolica [vɔˈlit͡sa] is a village in the administrative district of Gmina Busko-Zdrój, within Busko County, Świętokrzyskie Voivodeship, in south-central Poland. It lies approximately 4 km (2 mi) south of Busko-Zdrój and 51 km (32 mi) south of the regional capital Kielce.
