= Ruczynów =

- Village
- Location within Poland
- Coordinates: 50°28′N 20°50′E
- Country: Poland
- Voivodeship: Świętokrzyskie
- County: Busko
- Gmina: Busko-Zdrój

Ruczynów [ruˈt͡ʂɨnuf] is a village in the administrative district of Gmina Busko-Zdrój, within Busko County, Świętokrzyskie Voivodeship, in south-central Poland. It lies approximately 9 km (6 mi) east of Busko-Zdrój and 49 km (30 mi) south of the regional capital Kielce.
