= Bronina =

- Village
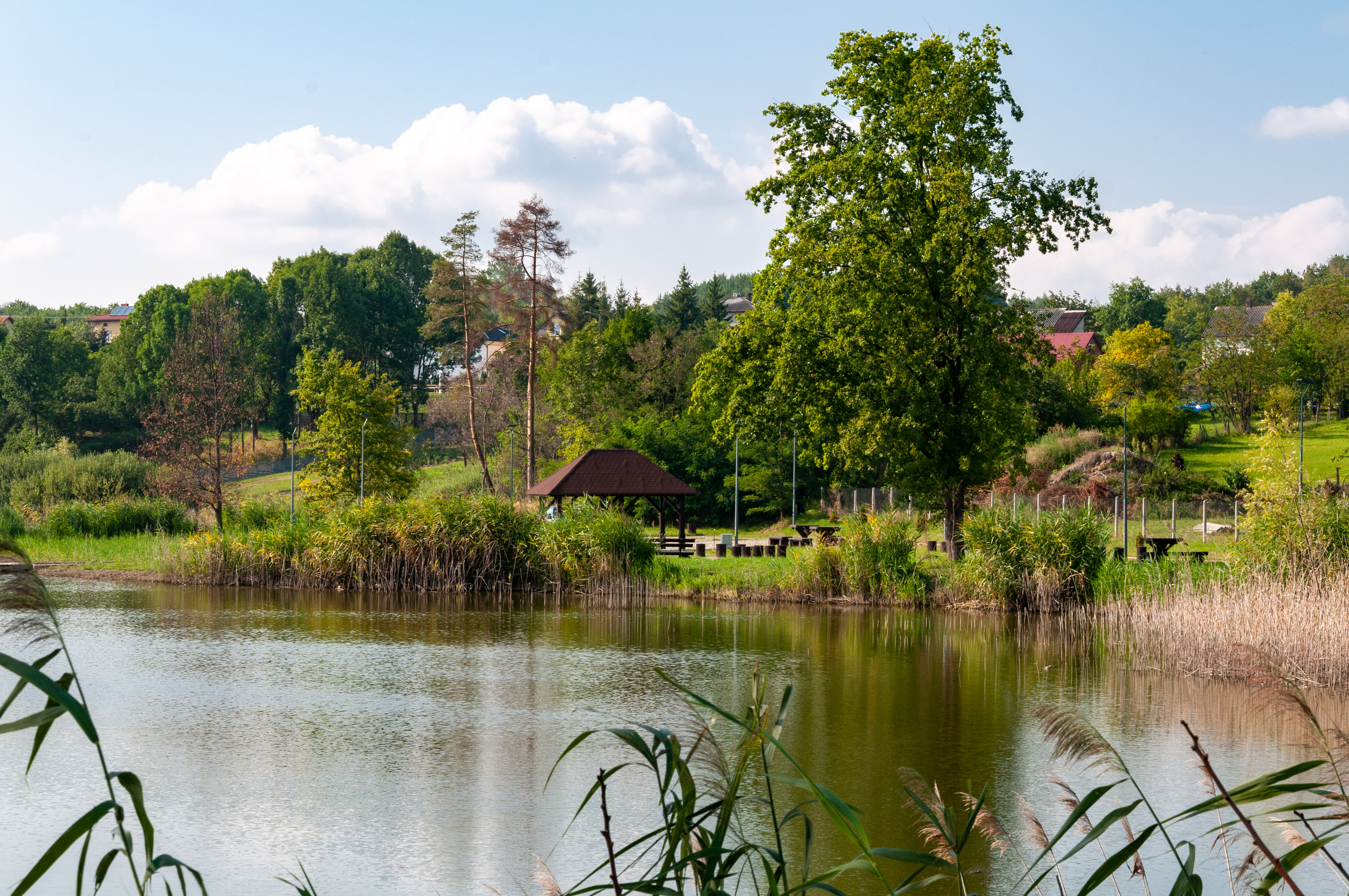
- Lake

- Location within Poland
- Coordinates: 50°28′N 20°46′E
- Country: Poland
- Voivodeship: Świętokrzyskie
- County: Busko
- Gmina: Busko-Zdrój

Bronina [brɔˈnina] is a village in the administrative district of Gmina Busko-Zdrój, within Busko County, Świętokrzyskie Voivodeship, in south-central Poland. It lies approximately 4 km (2 mi) east of Busko-Zdrój and 48 km (30 mi) south of the regional capital Kielce.
