= Baranów, Busko County =

Baranów
- Village
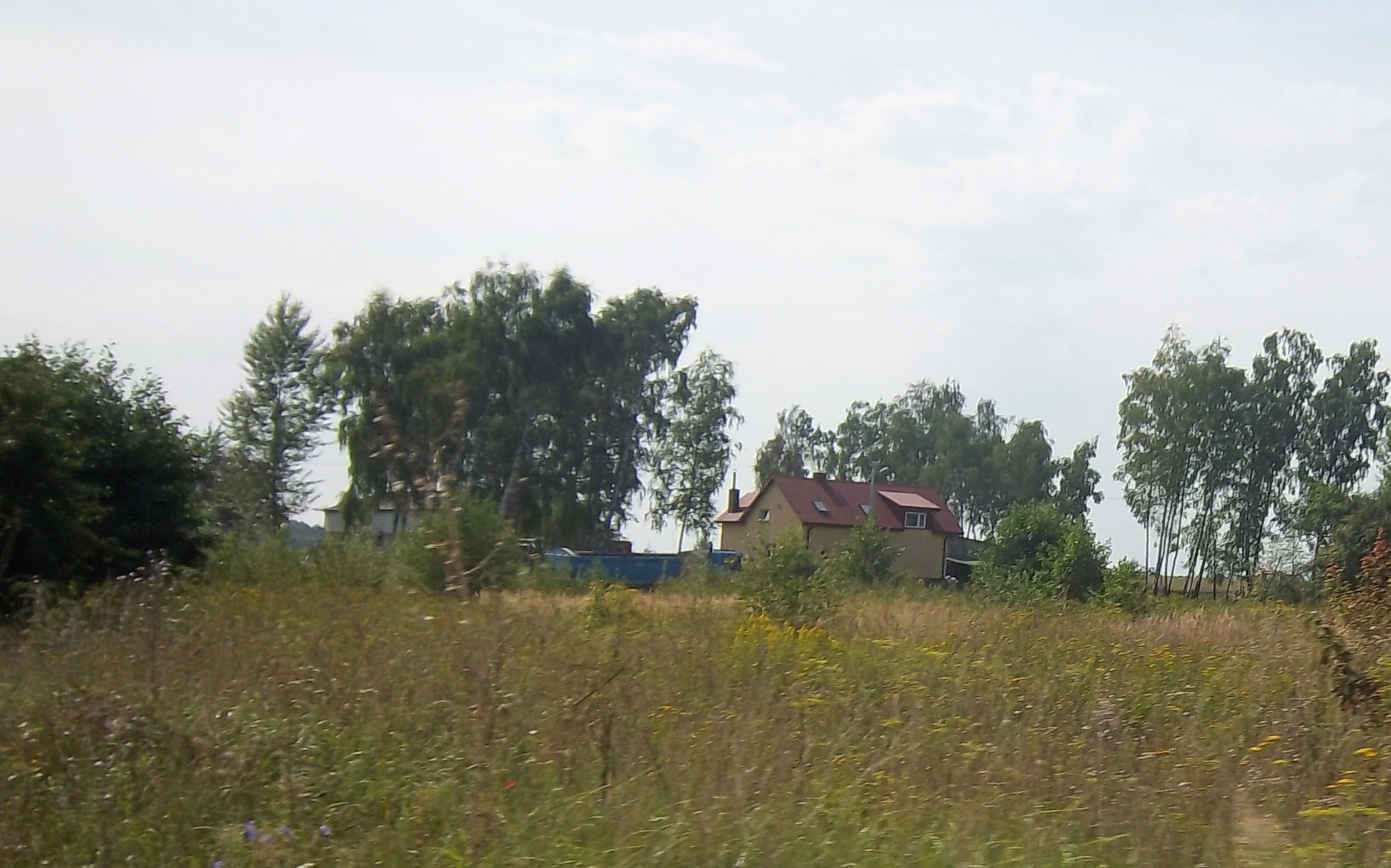

- Location within Poland
- Coordinates: 50°24′30″N 20°48′7″E
- Country: Poland
- Voivodeship: Świętokrzyskie
- County: Busko
- Gmina: Busko-Zdrój

Baranów [baˈranuf] is a village in the administrative district of Gmina Busko-Zdrój, within Busko County, Świętokrzyskie Voivodeship, in south-central Poland. It lies approximately 9 km (6 mi) south-east of Busko-Zdrój and 55 km (34 mi) south of the regional capital Kielce.

== See also ==
- The Lesser Polish Way
