= Mlyny =

Mlyny may refer to:

- Mlyny, a neighborhood in Shevchenkivskyi District, Dnipro, Ukraine
- Młyny (disambiguation), several places in Poland
- Mlýny, a municipality and village in the South Bohemian Region, Czech Republic
- Mlýny, a village and part of Bystřice (Benešov District) in the Central Bohemian Region, Czech Republic
- Mlýny, a village and part of Kytlice in the Ústí nad Labem Region, Czech Republic
- Mlýny, a village and part of Hrob in the Ústí nad Labem Region, Czech Republic
- Mlýny (play), a Czech comedy play

== See also ==
- Mlynyska, Ternopil Oblast, a village in Ukraine
