= Siesławice =

- Village
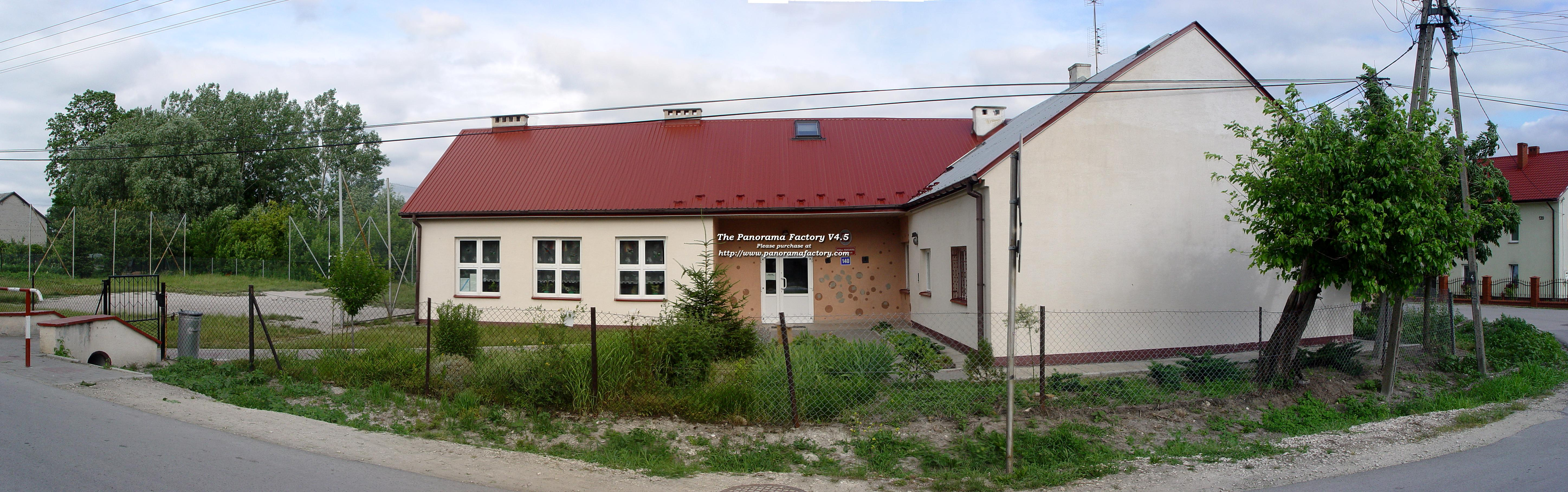
- School

- Location within Poland
- Coordinates: 50°27′N 20°42′E
- Country: Poland
- Voivodeship: Świętokrzyskie
- County: Busko
- Gmina: Busko-Zdrój

Siesławice [ɕɛswaˈvit͡sɛ] is a village in the administrative district of Gmina Busko-Zdrój, within Busko County, Świętokrzyskie Voivodeship, in south-central Poland. It lies approximately 3 km (2 mi) south-west of Busko-Zdrój and 49 km (30 mi) south of the regional capital Kielce.
