= Kotki, Świętokrzyskie Voivodeship =

Kotki
- Village
- Location within Poland
- Coordinates: 50°30′22″N 20°48′3″E
- Country: Poland
- Voivodeship: Świętokrzyskie
- County: Busko
- Gmina: Busko-Zdrój

Kotki [ˈkɔtki] is a village in the administrative district of Gmina Busko-Zdrój, within Busko County, Świętokrzyskie Voivodeship, in south-central Poland. It lies approximately 8 km (5 mi) north-east of Busko-Zdrój and 44 km (27 mi) south of the regional capital Kielce.
