= Błoniec =

- Village
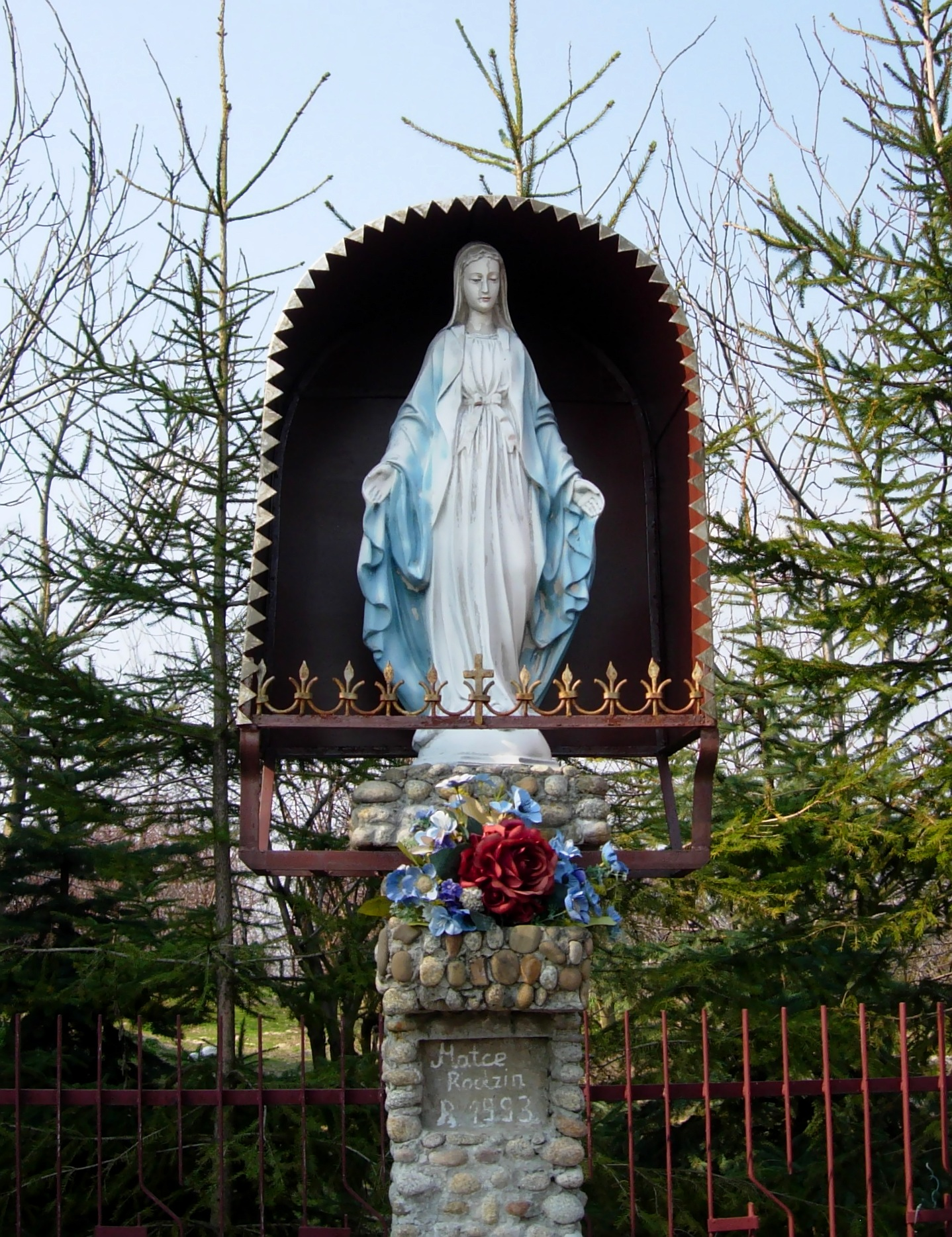
- Small chapel in Błoniec (Błoniec-Nowa Wieś), Poland

- Coat of arms

- Location within Poland
- Coordinates: 50°27′37″N 20°49′11″E
- Country: Poland
- Voivodeship: Świętokrzyskie
- County: Busko
- Gmina: Busko-Zdrój

Błoniec [ˈbwɔɲɛt͡s] is a village in the administrative district of Gmina Busko-Zdrój, within Busko County, Świętokrzyskie Voivodeship, in south-central Poland.
