= Galow =

Galow may refer to:

- Galow, Iran, a village in East Azerbaijan Province, Iran
- Galów, Świętokrzyskie Voivodeship, Poland
- Gałów, Lower Silesian Voivodeship, Poland
