= Kameduły =

- Village
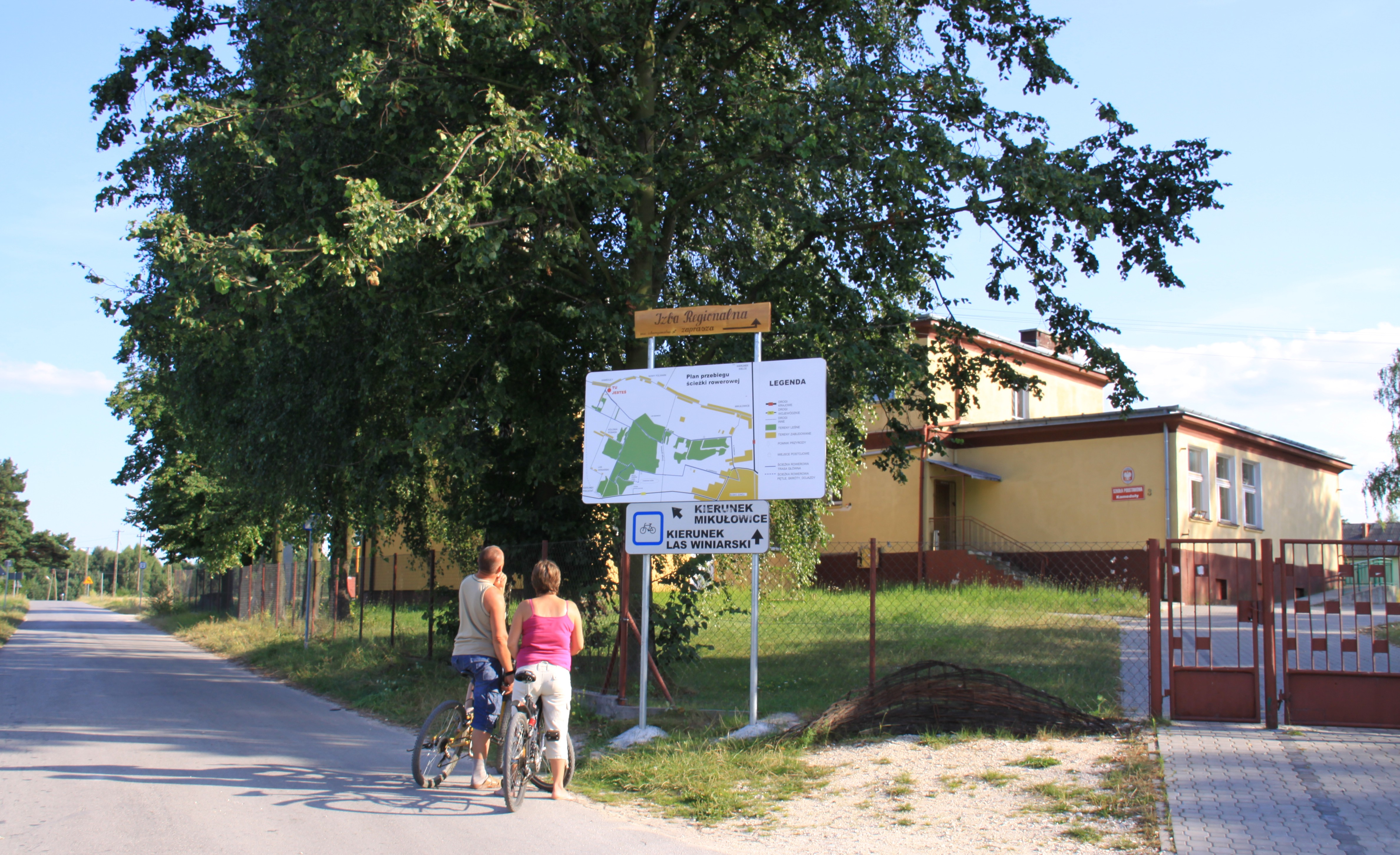

- Location within Poland
- Coordinates: 50°30′6″N 20°38′41″E
- Country: Poland
- Voivodeship: Świętokrzyskie
- County: Busko
- Gmina: Busko-Zdrój

Kameduły [kamɛˈduwɨ] is a village in the administrative district of Gmina Busko-Zdrój, within Busko County, Świętokrzyskie Voivodeship, in south-central Poland. It lies approximately 7 km (4 mi) north-west of Busko-Zdrój and 43 km (27 mi) south of the regional capital Kielce.
