= Nowa Wieś, Gmina Busko-Zdrój =

Nowa Wieś
- Village
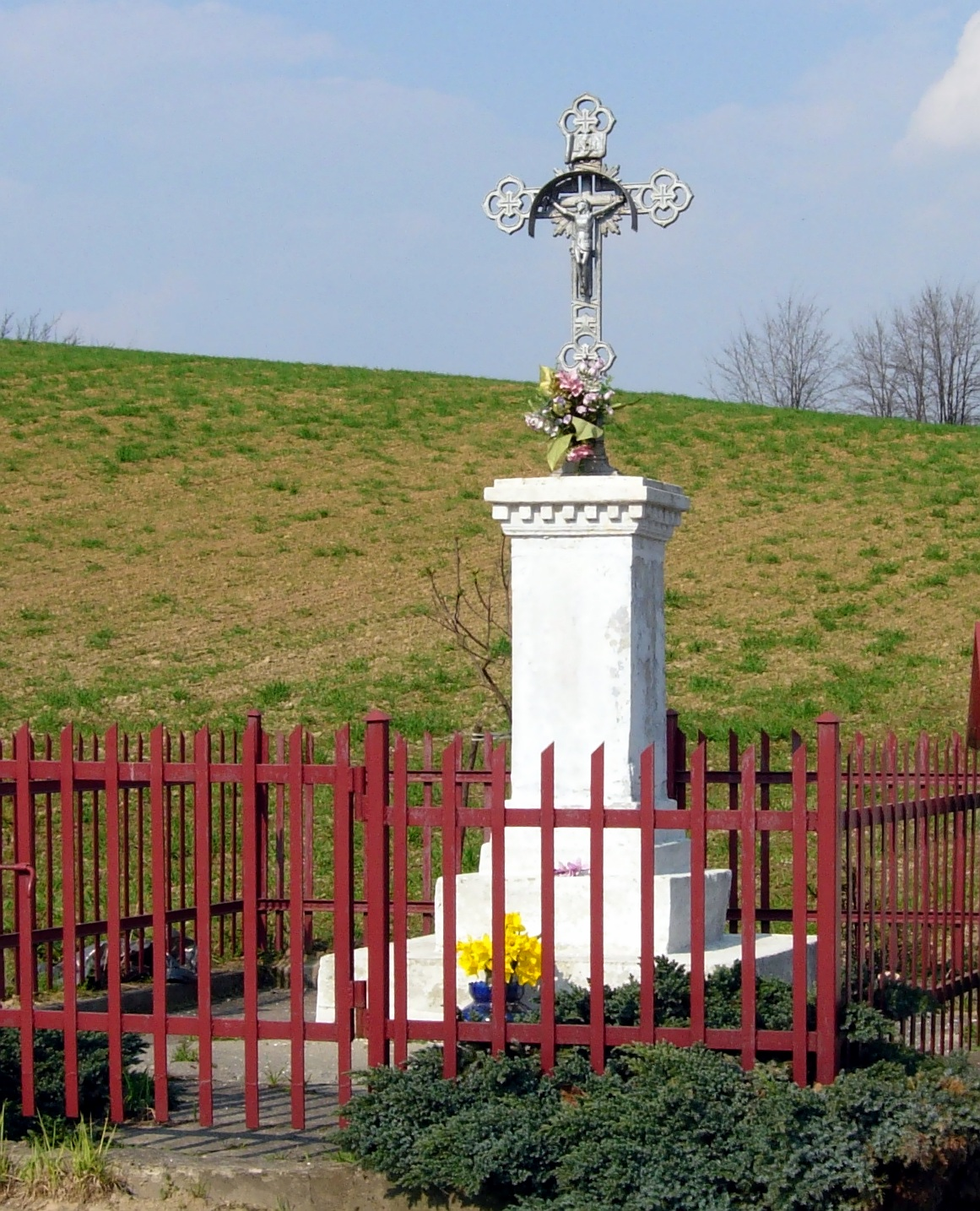

- Location within Poland
- Coordinates: 50°27′20″N 20°49′46″E
- Country: Poland
- Voivodeship: Świętokrzyskie
- County: Busko
- Gmina: Busko-Zdrój
- Population: 110

Nowa Wieś [ˈnɔva ˈvjɛɕ] is a village in the administrative district of Gmina Busko-Zdrój, within Busko County, Świętokrzyskie Voivodeship, in south-central Poland. It lies approximately 9 km (6 mi) east of Busko-Zdrój and 50 km (31 mi) south of the regional capital Kielce.
