= Szczaworyż =

- Village
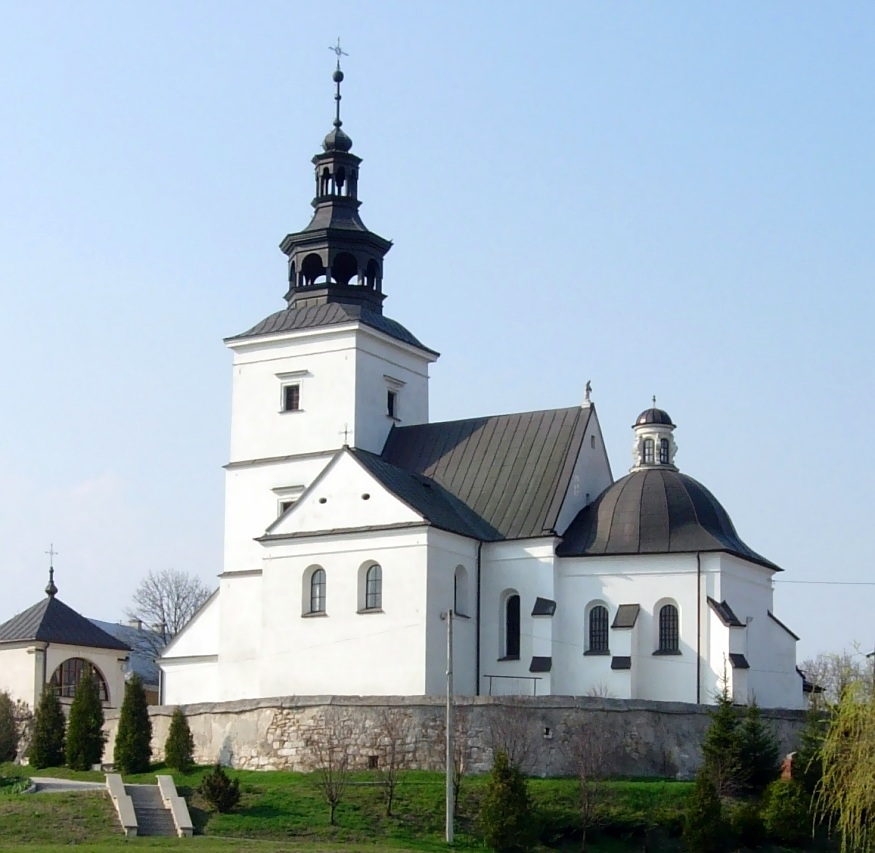
- Church of Saint James

- Location within Poland
- Coordinates: 50°27′N 20°49′E
- Country: Poland
- Voivodeship: Świętokrzyskie
- County: Busko
- Gmina: Busko-Zdrój

Population
  - Total: 230

Szczaworyż [ʂt͡ʂaˈvɔrɨʂ] is a village in the administrative district of Gmina Busko-Zdrój, within Busko County, Świętokrzyskie Voivodeship, in south-central Poland. It lies approximately 8 km (5 mi) east of Busko-Zdrój and 51 km (32 mi) south of the regional capital Kielce.

== See also ==
- Lesser Polish Way
