= Oleszki =

- Village
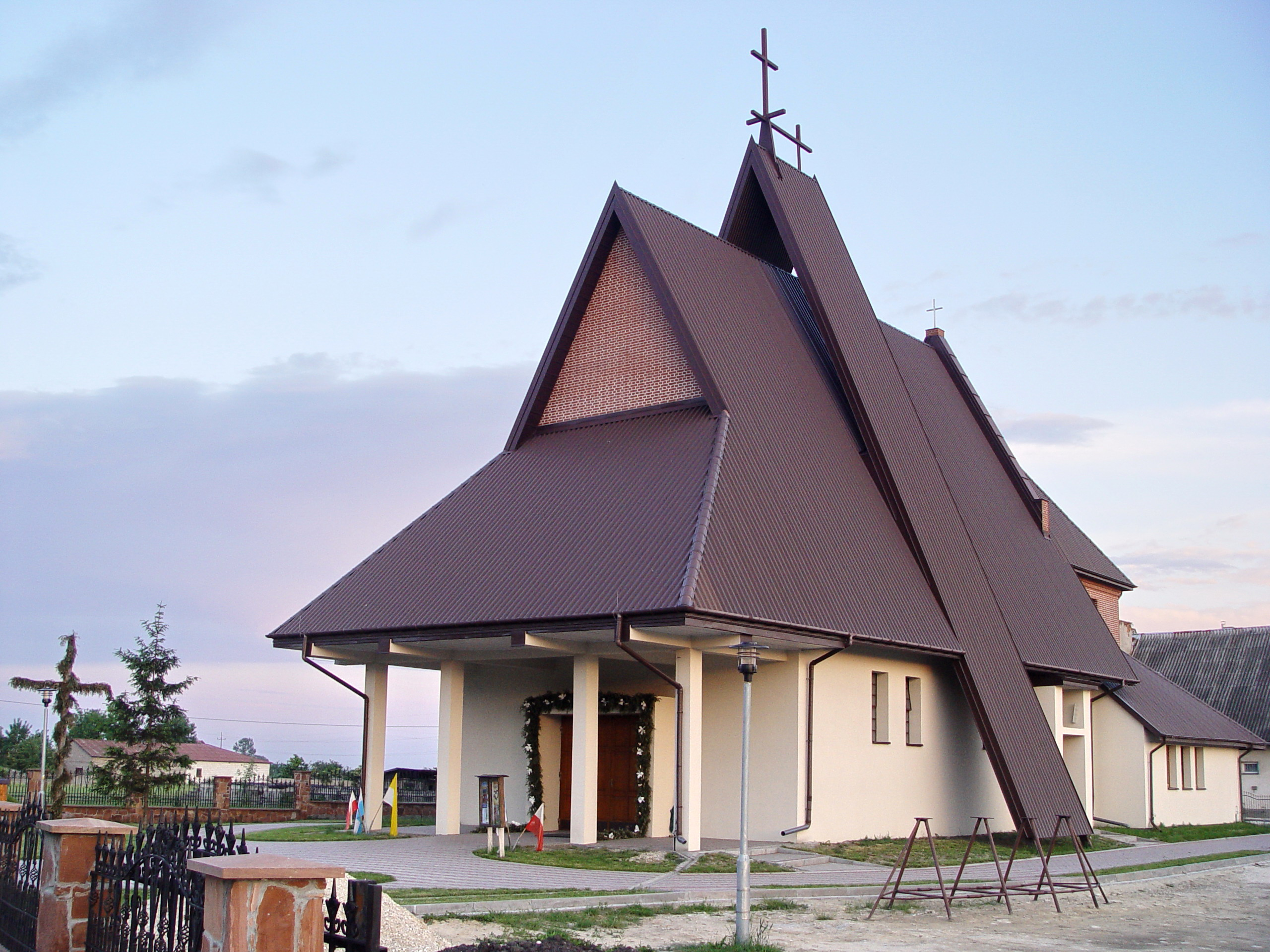
- Catholic church

- Location within Poland
- Coordinates: 50°27′40″N 20°39′16″E
- Country: Poland
- Voivodeship: Świętokrzyskie
- County: Busko
- Gmina: Busko-Zdrój

Oleszki [ɔˈlɛʂki] is a village in the administrative district of Gmina Busko-Zdrój, within Busko County, Świętokrzyskie Voivodeship, in south-central Poland. It lies approximately 5 km (3 mi) west of Busko-Zdrój and 47 km (29 mi) south of the regional capital Kielce.
