= Elżbiecin, Świętokrzyskie Voivodeship =

Elżbiecin
- Village
- Location within Poland
- Coordinates: 50°30′31″N 20°44′24″E
- Country: Poland
- Voivodeship: Świętokrzyskie
- County: Busko
- Gmina: Busko-Zdrój

Elżbiecin [ɛlʐˈbjɛt͡ɕin] is a village in the administrative district of Gmina Busko-Zdrój, within Busko County, Świętokrzyskie Voivodeship, in south-central Poland. It lies approximately 5 km (3 mi) north of Busko-Zdrój and 43 km (27 mi) south of the regional capital Kielce.
