= Służów =

- Village
- Location within Poland
- Coordinates: 50°32′N 20°49′E
- Country: Poland
- Voivodeship: Świętokrzyskie
- County: Busko
- Gmina: Busko-Zdrój

Służów [ˈswuʐuf] is a village in the administrative district of Gmina Busko-Zdrój, within Busko County, Świętokrzyskie Voivodeship, in south-central Poland. It lies approximately 11 km (7 mi) north-east of Busko-Zdrój and 42 km (26 mi) south of the regional capital Kielce.
