= Mikułowice, Busko County =

Mikułowice
- Village
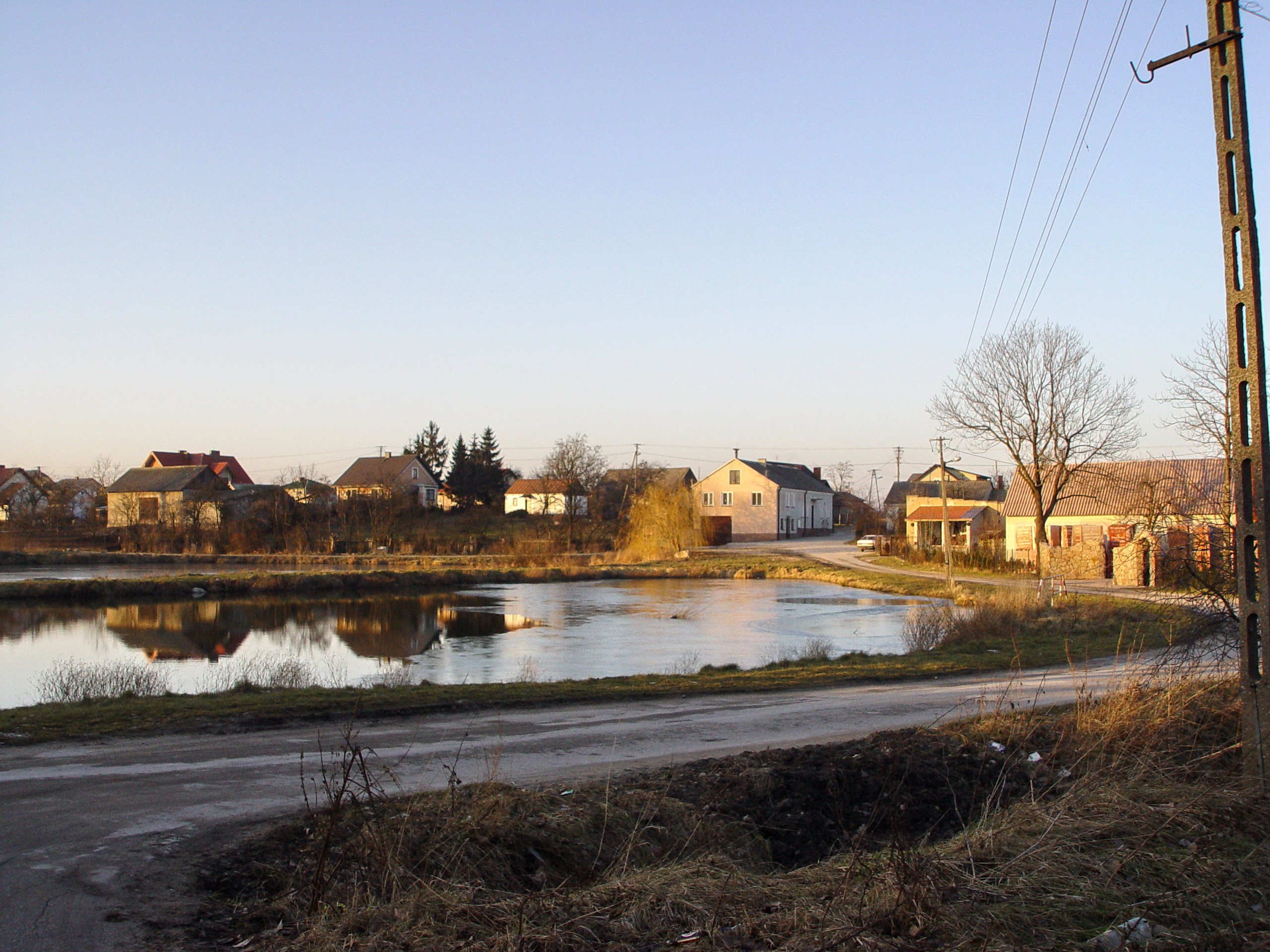

- Location within Poland
- Coordinates: 50°29′31″N 20°42′33″E
- Country: Poland
- Voivodeship: Świętokrzyskie
- County: Busko
- Gmina: Busko-Zdrój

Mikułowice [mikuwɔˈvit͡sɛ] is a village in the administrative district of Gmina Busko-Zdrój, within Busko County, Świętokrzyskie Voivodeship, in south-central Poland. It lies approximately 3 km (2 mi) north of Busko-Zdrój and 44 km (27 mi) south of the regional capital Kielce.
