= Nowy Folwark, Świętokrzyskie Voivodeship =

Nowy Folwark
- Village
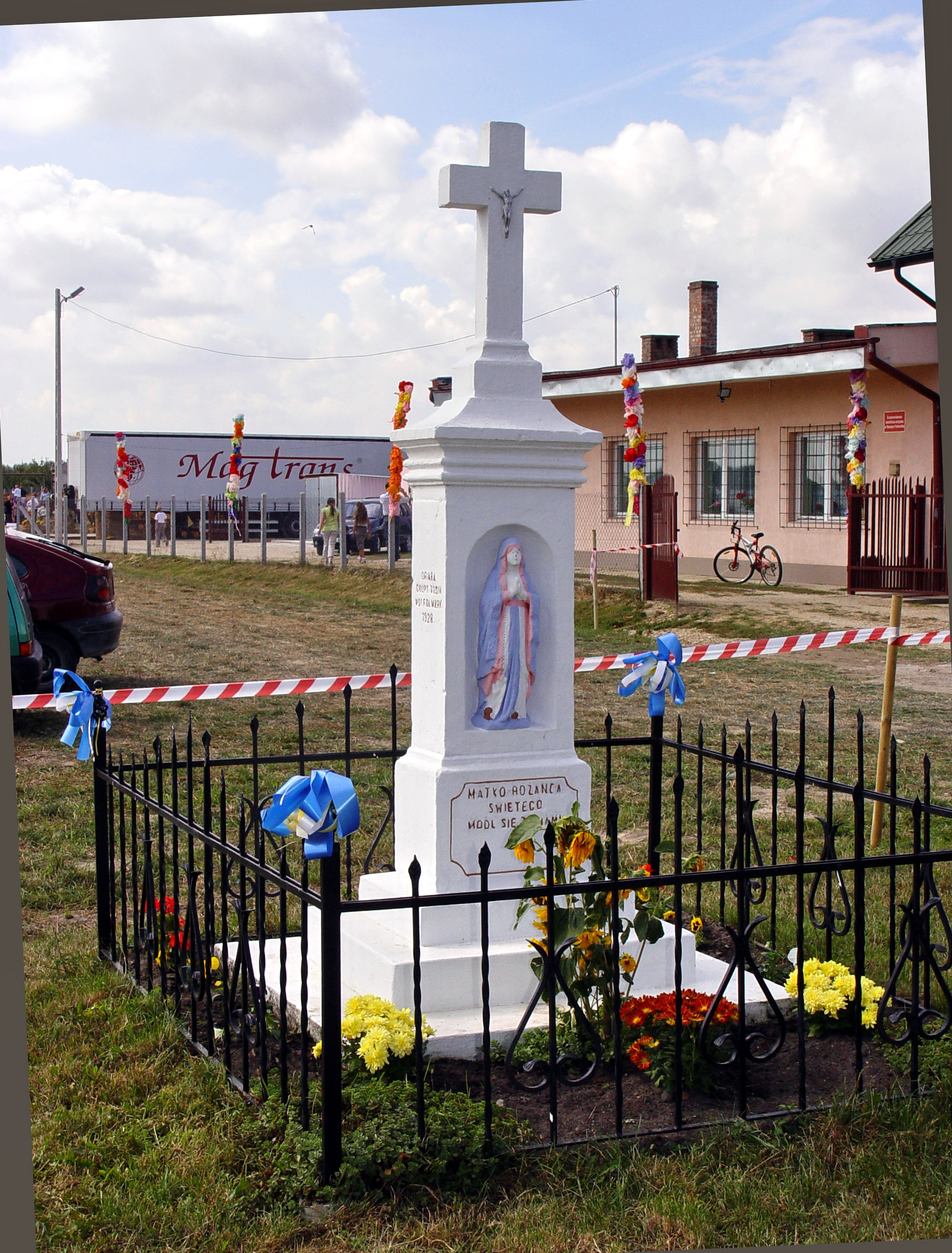

- Location within Poland
- Coordinates: 50°29′58″N 20°40′40″E
- Country: Poland
- Voivodeship: Świętokrzyskie
- County: Busko
- Gmina: Busko-Zdrój

Nowy Folwark [ˈnɔvɨ ˈfɔlvark] is a village in the administrative district of Gmina Busko-Zdrój, within Busko County, Świętokrzyskie Voivodeship, in south-central Poland. It lies approximately 5 km (3 mi) north-west of Busko-Zdrój and 43 km (27 mi) south of the regional capital Kielce.
