= Marek Sikora (actor) =

Polish film actor and theatre director

Marek Sikora (30 August 1959 in Busko-Zdrój – 22 April 1996 in Służów) was a Polish film actor and theatre director.
