= Szaniec Landscape Park =

Protected area in Poland

Coordinates: 50°30′N 20°45′E

- Szaniecki Park Krajobrazowy
- IUCN category V (protected landscape/seascape)
- Interactive map of Szaniec Landscape Park
- Location: Świętokrzyskie Voivodeship
- Area: 109.15 km^{2} (42.14 sq mi)

Szaniec Landscape Park (Szaniecki Park Krajobrazowy) is a protected area (Landscape Park) in south-central Poland, covering an area of 109.15 square kilometres (42.14 sq mi).

The Park lies within Świętokrzyskie Voivodeship: in Busko County (Gmina Busko-Zdrój, Gmina Solec-Zdrój, Gmina Stopnica), Kielce County (Gmina Chmielnik) and Pińczów County (Gmina Pińczów, Gmina Kije).
