= Galów =

- Village
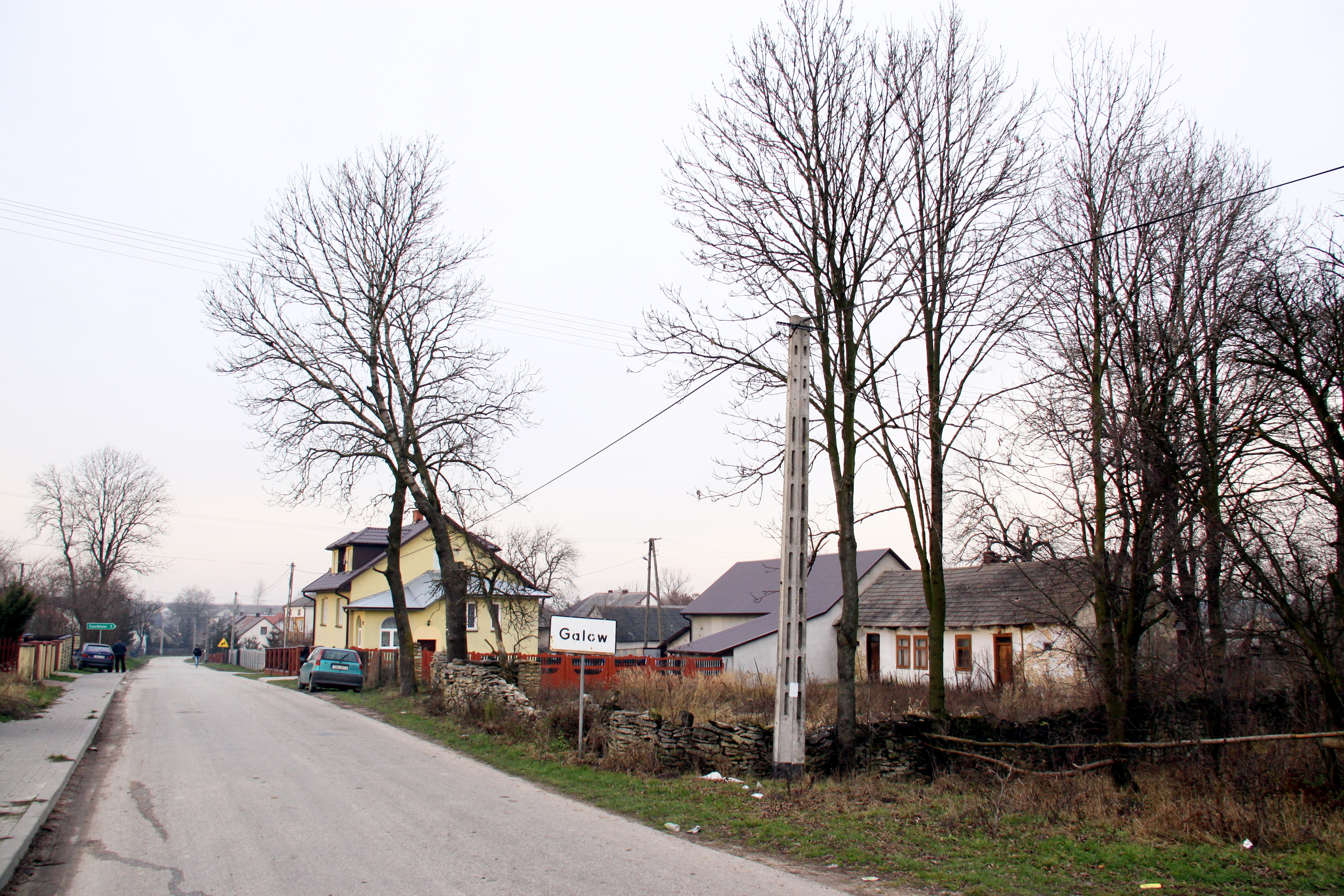

- Location within Poland
- Coordinates: 50°31′26″N 20°39′41″E
- Country: Poland
- Voivodeship: Świętokrzyskie
- County: Busko
- Gmina: Busko-Zdrój

Galów [ˈɡaluf] is a village in the administrative district of Gmina Busko-Zdrój, within Busko County, Świętokrzyskie Voivodeship, in south-central Poland. It lies approximately 8 km (5 mi) north-west of Busko-Zdrój and 41 km (25 mi) south of the regional capital Kielce.
