= Gmina Busko-Zdrój =

Commune Busko-Zdrój Busko-Zdrój Gmina
- Gmina
- Coat of arms
- Interactive map of Commune Busko-Zdrój
- Coordinates (Busko-Zdrój): 50°28′N 20°43′E
- Country: Poland
- Voivodeship: Świętokrzyskie
- County: Busko
- Seat: Busko-Zdrój

Area
  - Total: 235.88 km^{2} (91.07 sq mi)

Population (2006)
  - Total: 32,512
  - Density: 137.83/km^{2} (356.99/sq mi)
  - Urban: 17,297
  - Rural: 15,215
- Website: http://umig.busko.pl/

Gmina Busko-Zdrój is an urban-rural gmina (administrative district) in Busko County, Świętokrzyskie Voivodeship, in south-central Poland. Its seat is the town of Busko-Zdrój, which lies approximately 47 kilometres (29 mi) south of the regional capital Kielce.

The gmina covers an area of 235.88 square kilometres (91.1 sq mi), and as of 2006 its total population is 32,512, of which the population of Busko-Zdrój is 17,297, and the population of the rural part of the gmina is 15,215.

The gmina contains parts of the protected areas called Nida Landscape Park and Szaniec Landscape Park.

== Villages ==
Apart from the town of Busko-Zdrój, Gmina Busko-Zdrój contains the villages and settlements of Baranów, Bilczów, Biniątki, Błoniec, Bronina, Budzyń, Chotelek, Dobrowoda, Elżbiecin, Gadawa, Galów, Janina, Kameduły, Kawczyce, Kołaczkowice, Kostki Duże, Kostki Małe, Kotki, Łagiewniki, Las Winiarski, Mikułowice, Młyny, Nowa Wieś, Nowy Folwark, Oleszki, Olganów, Owczary, Palonki, Pęczelice, Podgaje, Radzanów, Ruczynów, Siesławice, Skorzów, Skotniki Duże, Skotniki Małe, Słabkowice, Służów, Szaniec, Szczaworyż, Wełecz, Widuchowa, Wolica, Zbludowice, Zbrodzice, Żerniki Górne and Zwierzyniec.

== Neighbouring gminas ==
Gmina Busko-Zdrój is bordered by the gminas of Chmielnik, Gnojno, Nowy Korczyn, Pińczów, Solec-Zdrój, Stopnica and Wiślica.
