= Młyny, Świętokrzyskie Voivodeship =

Młyny
- Village
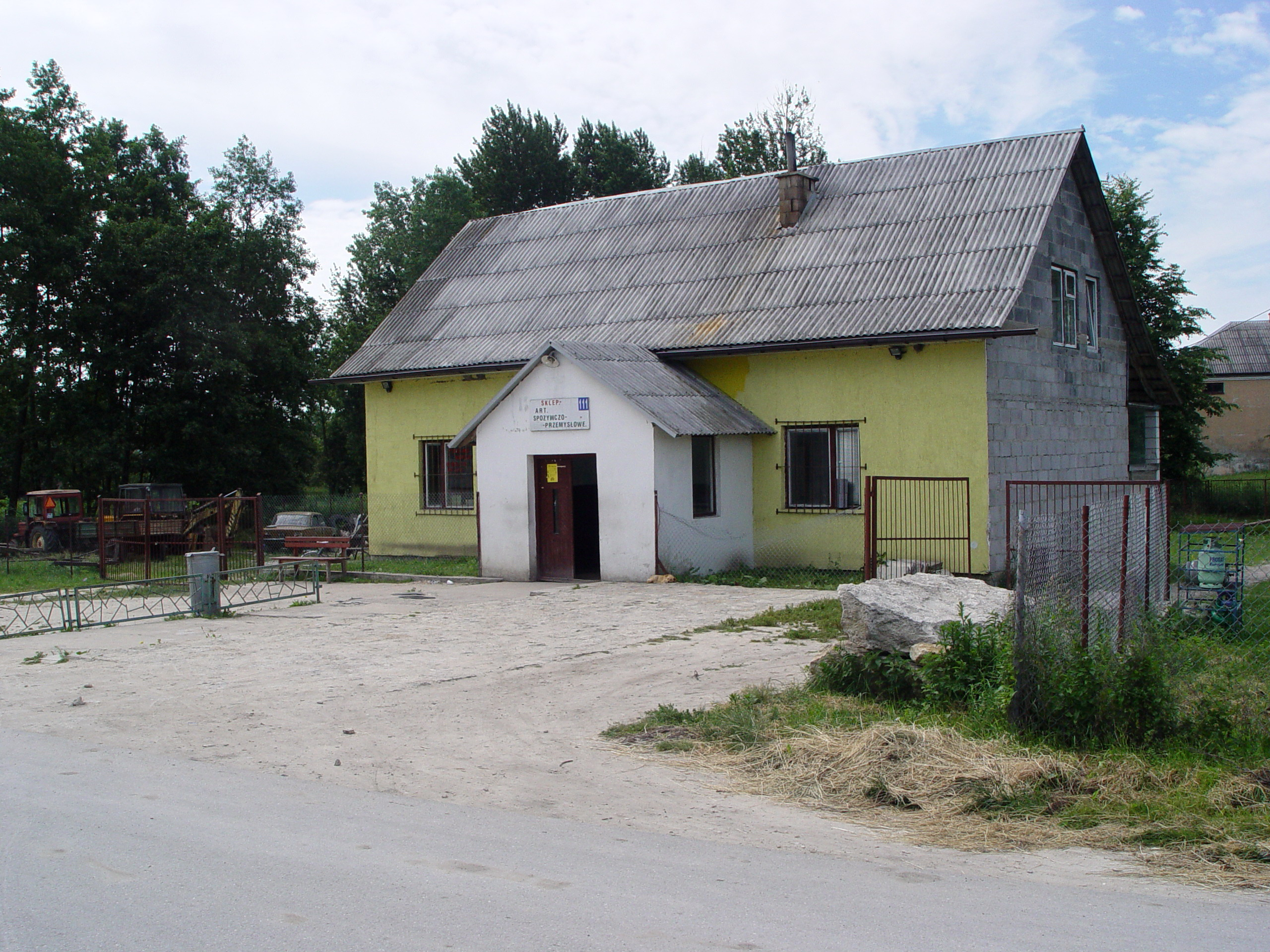

- Location within Poland
- Coordinates: 50°33′0″N 20°43′24″E
- Country: Poland
- Voivodeship: Świętokrzyskie
- County: Busko
- Gmina: Busko-Zdrój

Młyny [ˈmwɨnɨ] is a village in the administrative district of Gmina Busko-Zdrój, within Busko County, Świętokrzyskie Voivodeship, in south-central Poland.

== Location ==
It lies approximately 10 km (6 mi) north of Busko-Zdrój and 38 km (24 mi) south of the regional capital Kielce.
