= Kołaczkowice, Świętokrzyskie Voivodeship =

Kołaczkowice
- Village
- Location within Poland
- Coordinates: 50°30′N 20°52′E
- Country: Poland
- Voivodeship: Świętokrzyskie
- County: Busko
- Gmina: Busko-Zdrój
- Elevation: 206 m (676 ft)
- Population: 520

Kołaczkowice [kɔwat͡ʂkɔˈvit͡sɛ] is a village in the administrative district of Gmina Busko-Zdrój, within Busko County, Świętokrzyskie Voivodeship, in south-central Poland. It lies approximately 12 km (7 mi) east of Busko-Zdrój and 47 km (29 mi) south-east of the regional capital Kielce.
