= Radzanów, Świętokrzyskie Voivodeship =

Radzanów
- Village
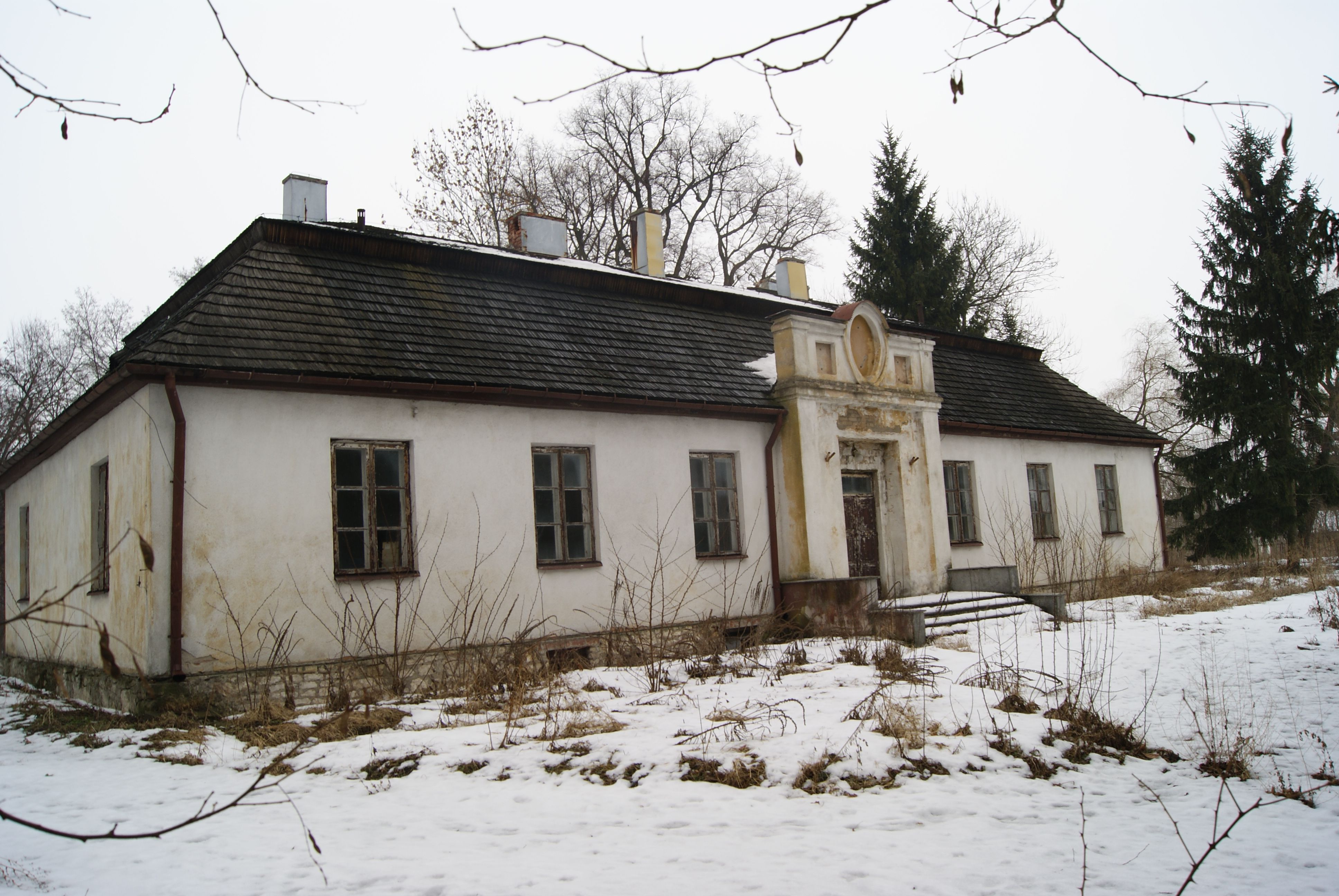
- Manor

- Location within Poland
- Coordinates: 50°26′4″N 20°45′9″E
- Country: Poland
- Voivodeship: Świętokrzyskie
- County: Busko
- Gmina: Busko-Zdrój

Radzanów [raˈd͡zanuf] is a village in the administrative district of Gmina Busko-Zdrój, within Busko County, Świętokrzyskie Voivodeship, in south-central Poland. It lies approximately 5 km (3 mi) south-east of Busko-Zdrój and 51 km (32 mi) south of the regional capital Kielce.

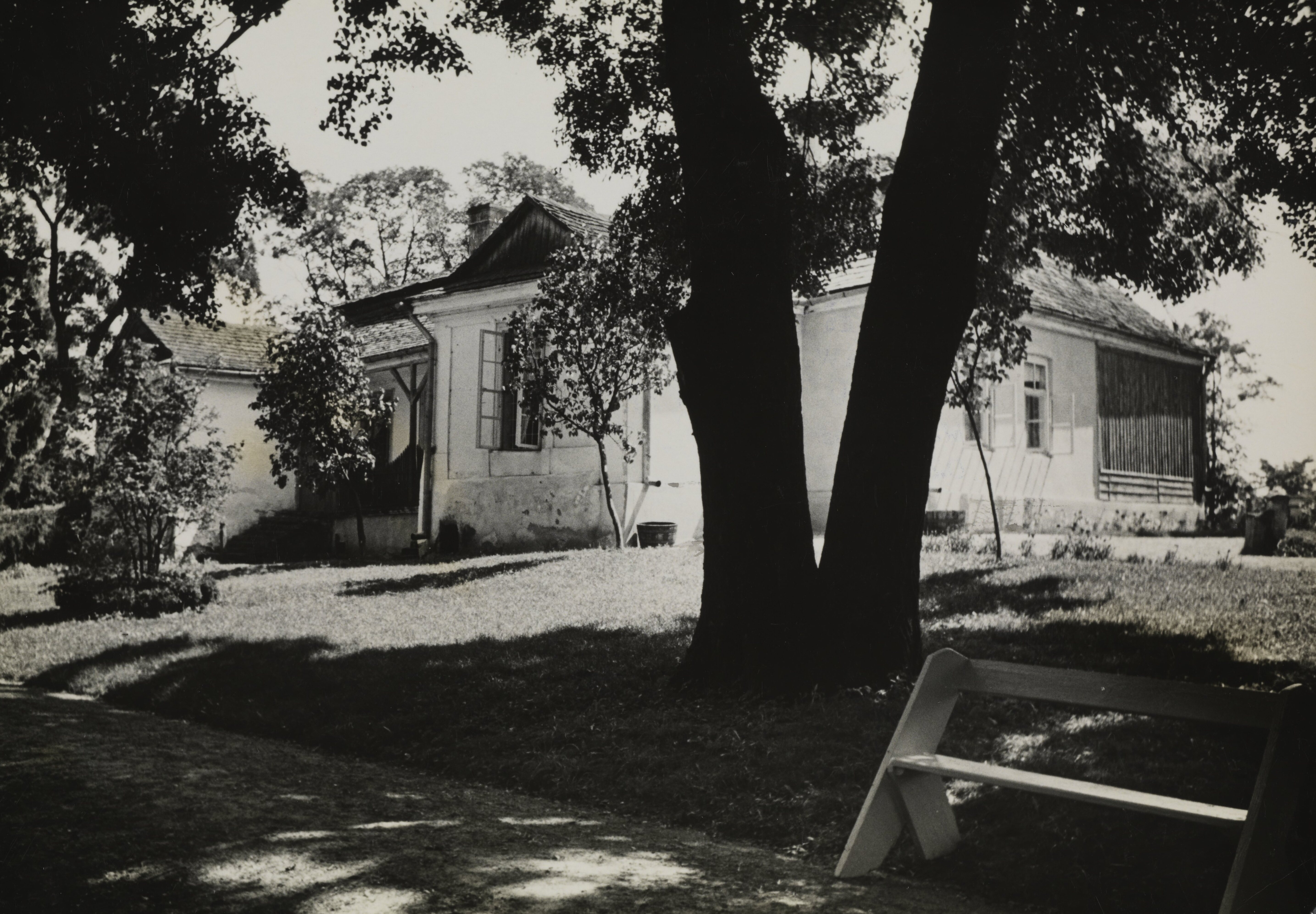
Manor house, ca 1936
