= Mlýny (play) =

Mlýny (English: The Mills) is a Czech comedy play, based on the early work of Václav Havel and Karel Brynda: Život před sebou (Life in front of you). It premiered in 1994.

== Story ==
The storyline is set in a military unit during the socialist era. The simple intrigue showed shooting a civilist for guard's service. A starting point of this satiric comedy depicts people's army as totally absurd "machine" destroying people's characters.

== Productions ==
=== Divadlo Sklep ===
- Directed by Ondřej Trojan and Jiří Fero Burda. The play had its premiere in 1994.
- Jan Slovák .... Lance Corporal Milan Maršík
- Jiří Fero Burda .... Private Marián Šimák/Ghost
- Petr Koutecký .... Private Čapek
- Otakáro Schmidt .... Private Houska
- František Fáňa Váša .... des. Abs. Toman
- Monika Načeva .... Technical Sergeant Boženka
- Tomáš Hanák .... Lieutenant Horáček
- David Vávra .... Lieutenant Colonel Malík
- Ondřej Trojan .... Captain Sládek
- Robert Nebřenský .... Major Buzgo
- Luboš Veselý .... trumpeter
