= Busko County =

Busko Busko
- County
- Flag Coat of arms

- Location within the voivodeship
- Coordinates (Busko-Zdrój): 50°28′N 20°43′E
- Country: Poland
- Voivodeship: Świętokrzyskie
- Seat: Busko-Zdrój
- Gminas: Total 8: Gmina Busko-Zdrój; Gmina Gnojno; Gmina Nowy Korczyn; Gmina Pacanów; Gmina Solec-Zdrój; Gmina Stopnica; Gmina Tuczępy; Gmina Wiślica

Area
  - Total: 967.39 km^{2} (373.51 sq mi)

Population (2019)
  - Total: 67,821
  - Density: 70.107/km^{2} (181.58/sq mi)
  - Urban: 15,832
  - Rural: 51,989
- Car plates: TBU
- Website: www.powiat.busko.pl

Busko (Polish: powiat buski) is a unit of territorial administration and local government (powiat) in Świętokrzyskie Voivodeship, south-central Poland. It came into being on January 1, 1999, as a result of the Polish local government reforms passed in 1998. Its administrative seat and only town is Busko-Zdrój, which lies 47 kilometres (29 mi) south of the regional capital Kielce.

The county covers an area of 967.39 square kilometres (373.5 sq mi). As of 2019 its total population is 67,821, out of which the population of Busko-Zdrój is 15,832 and the rural population is 51,989.

== Neighbouring counties ==
Busko County is bordered by Kielce County to the north, Staszów County to the east, Dąbrowa County to the south, Kazimierza County to the south-west and Pińczów County to the west.

== Administrative divisions ==
The county is subdivided into eight gminas (one urban-rural and seven rural). These are listed in the following table, in descending order of population.

Gmina	Type	Area (km^{2})	Population (2019)	Seat
Gmina Busko-Zdrój	urban-rural	235.9	32,183	Busko-Zdrój
Gmina Pacanów	rural	123.9	6,242	Pacanów
Gmina Stopnica	rural	125.4	6,200	Stopnica
Gmina Nowy Korczyn	rural	117.3	5,016	Nowy Korczyn
Gmina Wiślica	rural	100.6	4,990	Wiślica
Gmina Solec-Zdrój	rural	84.9	5,054	Solec-Zdrój
Gmina Gnojno	rural	95.7	4,373	Gnojno
Gmina Tuczępy	rural	83.7	3,763	Tuczępy
