= Skrobaczów =

- Village
- Location within Poland
- Coordinates: 50°27′39″N 20°54′21″E
- Country: Poland
- Voivodeship: Świętokrzyskie
- County: Busko
- Gmina: Stopnica

Skrobaczów [skrɔˈbat͡ʂuf] is a village in the administrative district of Gmina Stopnica, within Busko County, Świętokrzyskie Voivodeship, in south-central Poland. It lies approximately 4 km (2 mi) north-west of Stopnica, 14 km (9 mi) east of Busko-Zdrój, and 52 km (32 mi) south-east of the regional capital Kielce.
