= Konary, Busko County =

Konary
- Village
- Location within Poland
- Coordinates: 50°26′N 20°50′E
- Country: Poland
- Voivodeship: Świętokrzyskie
- County: Busko
- Gmina: Stopnica

Konary [kɔˈnarɨ] is a village in the administrative district of Gmina Stopnica, within Busko County, Świętokrzyskie Voivodeship, in south-central Poland. It lies approximately 8 km (5 mi) west of Stopnica, 10 km (6 mi) south-east of Busko-Zdrój, and 53 km (33 mi) south of the regional capital Kielce.
