= Kuchary, Gmina Stopnica =

Kuchary
- Village
- Location within Poland
- Coordinates: 50°27′N 20°52′E
- Country: Poland
- Voivodeship: Świętokrzyskie
- County: Busko
- Gmina: Stopnica
- Population: 240

Kuchary [kuˈxarɨ] is a village in the administrative district of Gmina Stopnica, within Busko County, Świętokrzyskie Voivodeship, in south-central Poland. It lies approximately 6 km (4 mi) west of Stopnica, 11 km (7 mi) east of Busko-Zdrój, and 52 km (32 mi) south of the regional capital Kielce.
