= Szczytniki, Gmina Stopnica =

Szczytniki
- Village
- Location within Poland
- Coordinates: 50°28′56″N 20°53′13″E
- Country: Poland
- Voivodeship: Świętokrzyskie
- County: Busko
- Gmina: Stopnica

Szczytniki [ʂt͡ʂɨtˈniki] is a village in the administrative district of Gmina Stopnica, within Busko County, Świętokrzyskie Voivodeship, in south-central Poland. It lies approximately 7 km (4 mi) north-west of Stopnica, 13 km (8 mi) east of Busko-Zdrój, and 49 km (30 mi) south-east of the regional capital Kielce.
