= Falęcin Stary =

- Village
- Location within Poland
- Coordinates: 50°28′14″N 20°57′2″E
- Country: Poland
- Voivodeship: Świętokrzyskie
- County: Busko
- Gmina: Stopnica

Falęcin Stary [faˈlɛnt͡ɕin ˈstarɨ] is a village in the administrative district of Gmina Stopnica, within Busko County, Świętokrzyskie Voivodeship, in south-central Poland. It lies approximately 4 km (2 mi) north of Stopnica, 17 km (11 mi) east of Busko-Zdrój, and 52 km (32 mi) south-east of the regional capital Kielce.
