= Kąty Stare =

- Village
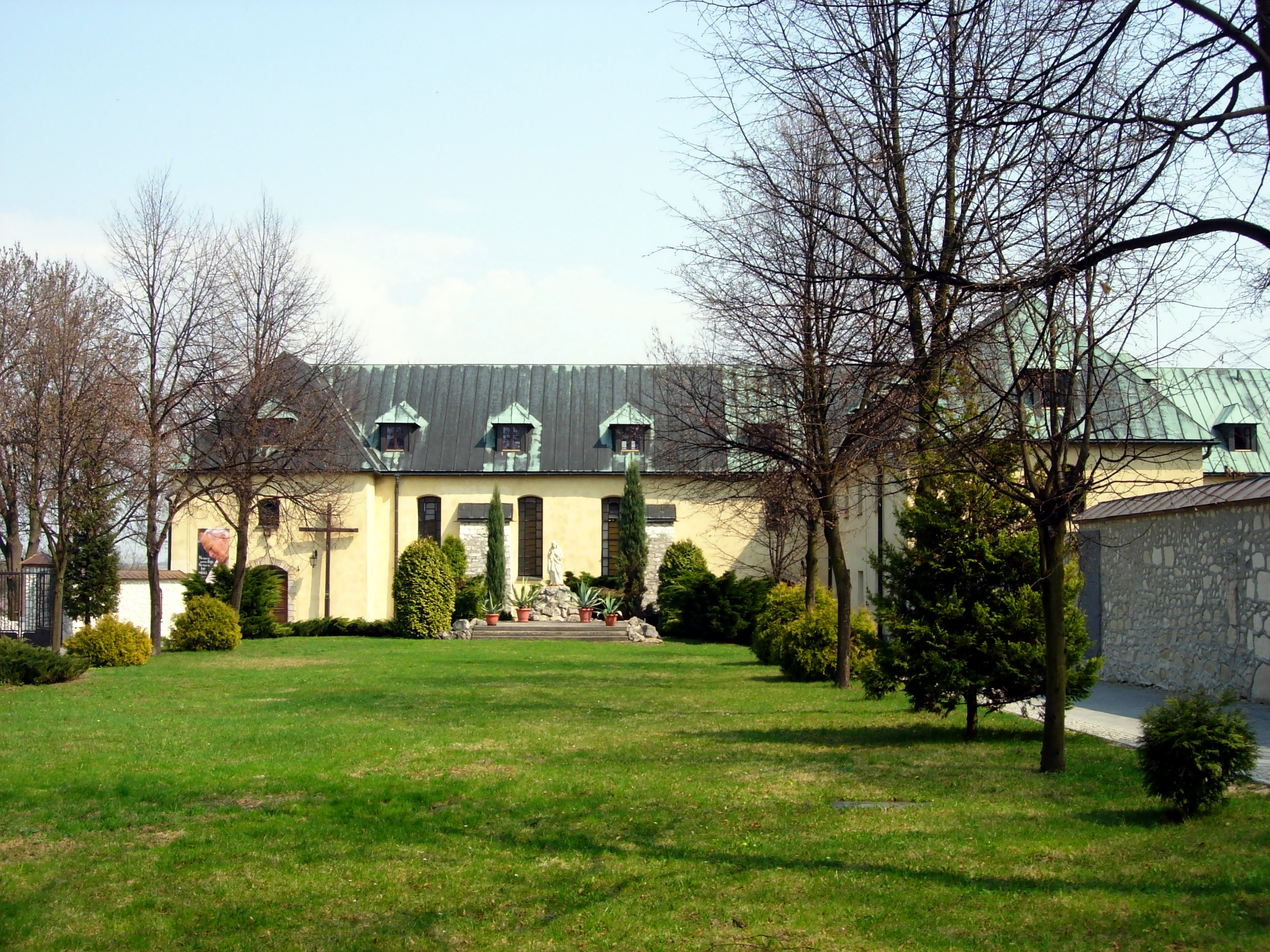
- Monastery

- Location within Poland
- Coordinates: 50°27′N 20°56′E
- Country: Poland
- Voivodeship: Świętokrzyskie
- County: Busko
- Gmina: Stopnica

Kąty Stare [ˈkɔntɨ ˈstarɛ] is a village in the administrative district of Gmina Stopnica, within Busko County, Świętokrzyskie Voivodeship, in south-central Poland. It lies approximately 2 km (1 mi) north-west of Stopnica, 16 km (10 mi) east of Busko-Zdrój, and 54 km (34 mi) south-east of the regional capital Kielce.
