= Wolica, Gmina Stopnica =

Wolica
- Village
- Location within Poland
- Coordinates: 50°26′N 20°55′E
- Country: Poland
- Voivodeship: Świętokrzyskie
- County: Busko
- Gmina: Stopnica
- Population (approx.): 550

Wolica [vɔˈlit͡sa] is a village in the administrative district of Gmina Stopnica, within Busko County, Świętokrzyskie Voivodeship, in south-central Poland. It lies approximately 2 km (1 mi) west of Stopnica, 15 km (9 mi) east of Busko-Zdrój, and 55 km (34 mi) south-east of the regional capital Kielce.
