= Czyżów, Busko County =

Czyżów
- Village
- Location within Poland
- Coordinates: 50°28′38″N 20°59′39″E
- Country: Poland
- Voivodeship: Świętokrzyskie
- County: Busko
- Gmina: Stopnica
- Population (approx.): 430

Czyżów [ˈt͡ʂɨʐuf] is a village in the administrative district of Gmina Stopnica, within Busko County, Świętokrzyskie Voivodeship, in south-central Poland. It lies approximately 6 km (4 mi) north-east of Stopnica, 20 km (12 mi) east of Busko-Zdrój, and 53 km (33 mi) south-east of the regional capital Kielce.
