= Zaborze, Busko County =

Zaborze
- Village
- Location within Poland
- Coordinates: 50°29′59″N 20°53′30″E
- Country: Poland
- Voivodeship: Świętokrzyskie
- County: Busko
- Gmina: Stopnica

Zaborze [zaˈbɔʐɛ] is a village in the administrative district of Gmina Stopnica, within Busko County, Świętokrzyskie Voivodeship, in south-central Poland. It lies approximately 8 km (5 mi) north-west of Stopnica, 13 km (8 mi) east of Busko-Zdrój, and 47 km (29 mi) south-east of the regional capital Kielce.
