= Topola, Busko County =

Topola
- Village
- Location within Poland
- Coordinates: 50°25′42″N 20°52′30″E
- Country: Poland
- Voivodeship: Świętokrzyskie
- County: Busko
- Gmina: Stopnica

Topola [tɔˈpɔla] is a village in the administrative district of Gmina Stopnica, within Busko County, Świętokrzyskie Voivodeship, in south-central Poland. It lies approximately 5 km (3 mi) west of Stopnica, 13 km (8 mi) east of Busko-Zdrój, and 54 km (34 mi) south of the regional capital Kielce.
