= Klępie Dolne =

- Village
- Location within Poland
- Coordinates: 50°26′N 21°0′E
- Country: Poland
- Voivodeship: Świętokrzyskie
- County: Busko
- Gmina: Stopnica

Klępie Dolne [ˈklɛmpjɛ ˈdɔlnɛ] is a village in the administrative district of Gmina Stopnica, within Busko County, Świętokrzyskie Voivodeship, in south-central Poland. It lies approximately 5 km (3 mi) east of Stopnica, 21 km (13 mi) east of Busko-Zdrój, and 57 km (35 mi) south-east of the regional capital Kielce.
