= Żerniki Dolne =

- Village
- Location within Poland
- Coordinates: 50°30′N 20°57′E
- Country: Poland
- Voivodeship: Świętokrzyskie
- County: Busko
- Gmina: Stopnica

Żerniki Dolne (Polish pronunciation: [ʐɛrˈɲikʲi ˈdɔlnɛ]) is a village in the administrative district of Gmina Stopnica, within Busko County, Świętokrzyskie Voivodeship, in south-central Poland. It lies approximately 7 km (4 mi) north of Stopnica, 17 km (11 mi) east of Busko-Zdrój, and 49 km (30 mi) south-east of the regional capital Kielce.
