= Prusy, Busko County =

Prusy
- Village
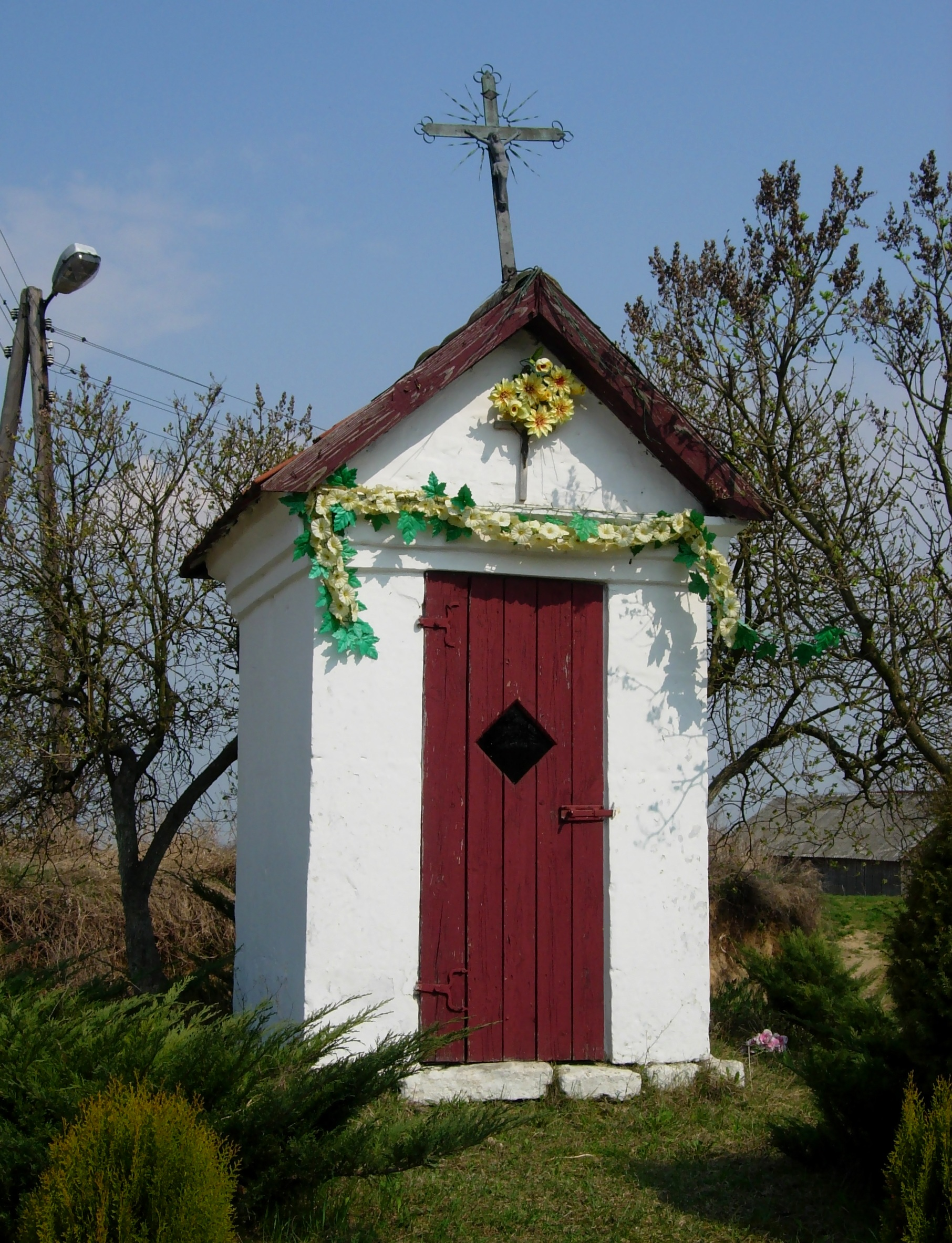
- Chapel

- Location within Poland
- Coordinates: 50°27′N 20°54′E
- Country: Poland
- Voivodeship: Świętokrzyskie
- County: Busko
- Gmina: Stopnica

Prusy [ˈprusɨ] is a village in the administrative district of Gmina Stopnica, within Busko County, Świętokrzyskie Voivodeship, in south-central Poland, approximately 4 km (2 mi) northwest of Stopnica, 14 km (9 mi) east of Busko-Zdrój, and 53 km (33 mi) southeast of the regional capital Kielce.
