= Mietel =

- Village
- Location within Poland
- Coordinates: 50°25′17″N 20°58′33″E
- Country: Poland
- Voivodeship: Świętokrzyskie
- County: Busko
- Gmina: Stopnica

Mietel [ˈmjɛtɛl] is a village in the administrative district of Gmina Stopnica, within Busko County, Świętokrzyskie Voivodeship, in south-central Poland. It lies approximately 4 km (2 mi) south-east of Stopnica, 20 km (12 mi) east of Busko-Zdrój, and 58 km (36 mi) south-east of the regional capital Kielce.
