= Szklanów =

- Village
- Location within Poland
- Coordinates: 50°25′5″N 20°54′19″E
- Country: Poland
- Voivodeship: Świętokrzyskie
- County: Busko
- Gmina: Stopnica

Szklanów [ˈʂklanuf] is a village in the administrative district of Gmina Stopnica, within Busko County, Świętokrzyskie Voivodeship, in south-central Poland. It lies approximately 4 km (2 mi) south-west of Stopnica, 15 km (9 mi) east of Busko-Zdrój, and 56 km (35 mi) south of the regional capital Kielce.
