= Nowa Wieś, Gmina Stopnica =

Nowa Wieś
- Village
- Location within Poland
- Coordinates: 50°26′18″N 20°58′43″E
- Country: Poland
- Voivodeship: Świętokrzyskie
- County: Busko
- Gmina: Stopnica
- Population: 170

Nowa Wieś [ˈnɔva ˈvjɛɕ] is a village in the administrative district of Gmina Stopnica, within Busko County, Świętokrzyskie Voivodeship, in south-central Poland. It lies approximately 3 km (2 mi) east of Stopnica, 19 km (12 mi) east of Busko-Zdrój, and 56 km (35 mi) south-east of the regional capital Kielce.
