= Suchowola, Busko County =

Suchowola
- Village
- Location within Poland
- Coordinates: 50°24′51″N 20°55′36″E
- Country: Poland
- Voivodeship: Świętokrzyskie
- County: Busko
- Gmina: Stopnica

Suchowola [suxɔˈvɔla] is a village in the administrative district of Gmina Stopnica, within Busko County, Świętokrzyskie Voivodeship, in south-central Poland. It lies approximately 3 km (2 mi) south of Stopnica, 16 km (10 mi) east of Busko-Zdrój, and 57 km (35 mi) south-east of the regional capital Kielce.
