= Falęcin Nowy =

- Village
- Location within Poland
- Coordinates: 50°27′N 20°57′E
- Country: Poland
- Voivodeship: Świętokrzyskie
- County: Busko
- Gmina: Stopnica
- Population (approx.): 140

Falęcin Nowy [faˈlɛnt͡ɕin ˈnɔvɨ] is a village in the administrative district of Gmina Stopnica, within Busko County, Świętokrzyskie Voivodeship, in south-central Poland. It lies approximately 2 km (1 mi) north-east of Stopnica, 17 km (11 mi) east of Busko-Zdrój, and 54 km (34 mi) south-east of the regional capital Kielce.
