= Borek, Świętokrzyskie Voivodeship =

Borek
- Village
- Location within Poland
- Coordinates: 50°24′N 20°57′E
- Country: Poland
- Voivodeship: Świętokrzyskie
- County: Busko
- Gmina: Stopnica

Borek [ˈbɔrɛk] is a village in the administrative district of Gmina Stopnica, within Busko County, Świętokrzyskie Voivodeship, in south-central Poland. It lies approximately 5 km (3 mi) south of Stopnica, 19 km (12 mi) south-east of Busko-Zdrój, and 59 km (37 mi) south-east of the regional capital Kielce.
