= Szczeglin, Świętokrzyskie Voivodeship =

Szczeglin
- Village
- Location within Poland
- Coordinates: 50°25′1″N 20°59′43″E
- Country: Poland
- Voivodeship: Świętokrzyskie
- County: Busko
- Gmina: Stopnica

Szczeglin [ˈʂt͡ʂɛɡlin] is a village in the administrative district of Gmina Stopnica, within Busko County, Świętokrzyskie Voivodeship, in south-central Poland. It lies approximately 5 km (3 mi) south-east of Stopnica, 21 km (13 mi) east of Busko-Zdrój, and 59 km (37 mi) south-east of the regional capital Kielce.
