= Folwarki =

Folwarki may refer to the following places in Poland:

- Folwarki, Świętokrzyskie Voivodeship (central south Poland)
- Folwarki, Subcarpathian Voivodeship (south east Poland)
- Rowień-Folwarki in Silesian Voivodeship (south Poland)
