= Dziesławice =

Dziesławice may refer to the following villages in Poland:

- Dziesławice, Lower Silesian Voivodeship (south-west Poland)
- Dziesławice, Świętokrzyskie Voivodeship (south-central Poland)
