= Gmina Stopnica =

Gmina Stopnica Stopnica Commune
- Gmina
- Coat of arms
- Interactive map of Gmina Stopnica
- Coordinates (Stopnica): 50°26′21″N 20°56′26″E
- Country: Poland
- Voivodeship: Świętokrzyskie
- County: Busko
- Seat: Stopnica

Area
  - Total: 125.43 km^{2} (48.43 sq mi)

Population (2006)
  - Total: 7,838
  - Density: 62.49/km^{2} (161.8/sq mi)
- Website: http://www.stopnica.pl

Gmina Stopnica is a rural gmina (administrative district) in Busko County, Świętokrzyskie Voivodeship, in south-central Poland. Its seat is the village of Stopnica, which lies approximately 17 kilometres (11 mi) east of Busko-Zdrój and 55 km (34 mi) south-east of the regional capital Kielce.

The gmina covers an area of 125.43 square kilometres (48.4 sq mi), and as of 2006 its total population is 7,838.

The gmina contains part of the protected area called Szaniec Landscape Park.

== Villages ==
Gmina Stopnica contains the villages and settlements of Białoborze, Borek, Bosowice, Czyżów, Dziesławice, Falęcin Nowy, Falęcin Stary, Folwarki, Jastrzębiec, Kąty Nowe, Kąty Stare, Klępie Dolne, Klępie Górne, Konary, Kuchary, Mariampol, Mietel, Nowa Wieś, Podlasek, Prusy, Skrobaczów, Smogorzów, Stopnica, Strzałków, Suchowola, Szczeglin, Szczytniki, Szklanów, Topola, Wolica, Zaborze and Żerniki Dolne.

== Neighbouring gminas ==
Gmina Stopnica is bordered by the gminas of Busko-Zdrój, Gnojno, Oleśnica, Pacanów, Solec-Zdrój and Tuczępy.
