= Dziesławice, Świętokrzyskie Voivodeship =

Dziesławice
- Village
- Location within Poland
- Coordinates: 50°28′25″N 20°58′3″E
- Country: Poland
- Voivodeship: Świętokrzyskie
- County: Busko
- Gmina: Stopnica
- Population (approx.): 260

Dziesławice [d͡ʑɛswaˈvit͡sɛ] is a village in the administrative district of Gmina Stopnica, within Busko County, Świętokrzyskie Voivodeship, in south-central Poland. It lies approximately 5 km (3 mi) north-east of Stopnica, 18 km (11 mi) east of Busko-Zdrój, and 52 km (32 mi) south-east of the regional capital Kielce.
