= Folwarki, Świętokrzyskie Voivodeship =

Folwarki
- Village
- Location within Poland
- Coordinates: 50°27′3″N 20°56′7″E
- Country: Poland
- Voivodeship: Świętokrzyskie
- County: Busko
- Gmina: Stopnica

Folwarki [fɔlˈvarki] is a village in the administrative district of Gmina Stopnica, within Busko County, Świętokrzyskie Voivodeship, in south-central Poland. It lies approximately 2 km (1 mi) north of Stopnica, 16 km (10 mi) east of Busko-Zdrój, and 53 km (33 mi) south-east of the regional capital Kielce.
