= Jastrzębiec, Świętokrzyskie Voivodeship =

Jastrzębiec
- Village
- Location within Poland
- Coordinates: 50°29′N 20°56′E
- Country: Poland
- Voivodeship: Świętokrzyskie
- County: Busko
- Gmina: Stopnica
- Population (approx.): 200

Jastrzębiec [jasˈtʂɛmbjɛt͡s] is a village in the administrative district of Gmina Stopnica, within Busko County, Świętokrzyskie Voivodeship, in south-central Poland. It lies approximately 5 km (3 mi) north of Stopnica, 16 km (10 mi) east of Busko-Zdrój, and 50 km (31 mi) south-east of the regional capital Kielce.
