= Różycki =

Różycki may refer to:

- Jerzy Różycki (1909–1942), Polish mathematician and cryptologist who worked at breaking German Enigma-machine ciphers
- Ludomir Różycki (1884–1953), Polish composer and conductor
- Łukasz Różycki, Polish pair skater
- Samuel Różycki (1781–1834), officer in the Duchy of Warsaw and Polish Legions of the Napoleonic period
- Zenon Różycki (1913–1992), Polish basketball player
- Max Kepler-Rozycki (born 1993), German baseball player
