= Podlasek =

Podlasek may refer to the following places:

- Podlasek, Podlaskie Voivodeship (north-east Poland)
- Podlasek, Świętokrzyskie Voivodeship (south-central Poland)
- Podlasek, Warmian-Masurian Voivodeship (north Poland)
