= Smogorzów =

Smogorzów may refer to the following places:

- Smogorzów, Lublin Voivodeship (east Poland)
- Smogorzów, Masovian Voivodeship (east-central Poland)
- Smogorzów, Świętokrzyskie Voivodeship (south-central Poland)
- Smogorzów, Opole Voivodeship (south-west Poland)
