= Jastrzębiec =

Jastrzębiec may refer to the following places:

- Jastrzębiec, Włocławek County in Kuyavian-Pomeranian Voivodeship (north-central Poland)
- Jastrzębiec, Sępólno County in Kuyavian-Pomeranian Voivodeship (north-central Poland)
- Jastrzębiec, Świętokrzyskie Voivodeship (south-central Poland)
- Jastrzębiec, Subcarpathian Voivodeship (south-east Poland)
- Jastrzębiec, Masovian Voivodeship (east-central Poland)
- Jastrzębiec, Greater Poland Voivodeship (west-central Poland)
- Jastrzębiec, Lubusz Voivodeship (west Poland)

== See also ==
- Jastrzębiec coat of arms
