= Mariampol =

Mariampol may refer to:

- Polish name for Marijampolė in Lithuania
- Mariampol, Greater Poland Voivodeship (central Poland)
- Mariampol, Opoczno County in Łódź Voivodeship (central Poland)
- Mariampol, Zgierz County in Łódź Voivodeship (central Poland)
- Mariampol, Gmina Leśna Podlaska, Biała County in Lublin Voivodeship (east Poland)
- Mariampol, Gmina Józefów nad Wisłą, Opole County in Lublin Voivodeship (east Poland)
- Mariampol, Gmina Jaktorów, Grodzisk County in Masovian Voivodeship (east-central Poland)
- Mariampol, Kozienice County in Masovian Voivodeship (east-central Poland)
- Mariampol, Świętokrzyskie Voivodeship (south Poland)

== See also ==
- Mariyampil
- Mariampole
- Marienfeld
- Marienfelde
