= Twarog =

Twarog may refer to:

People:

- Betty Twarog (1927–2013), American biochemist
- Michał Twaróg of Bystrzyków (1450–1520), Polish philosopher and theologian

Other:

- Twaróg (in Polish) and Tvorog in Russian), local names for the dairy product known as Quark
- 22791 Twarog, a minor planet. See List of minor planets: 22001–23000
