= Smogorzów, Świętokrzyskie Voivodeship =

Smogorzów
- Village
- Location within Poland
- Coordinates: 50°26′22″N 20°51′30″E
- Country: Poland
- Voivodeship: Świętokrzyskie
- County: Busko
- Gmina: Stopnica

Smogorzów [smɔˈɡɔʐuf] is a village in the administrative district of Gmina Stopnica, within Busko County, Świętokrzyskie Voivodeship, in south-central Poland. It lies approximately 6 km (4 mi) west of Stopnica, 11 km (7 mi) east of Busko-Zdrój, and 53 km (33 mi) south of the regional capital Kielce.

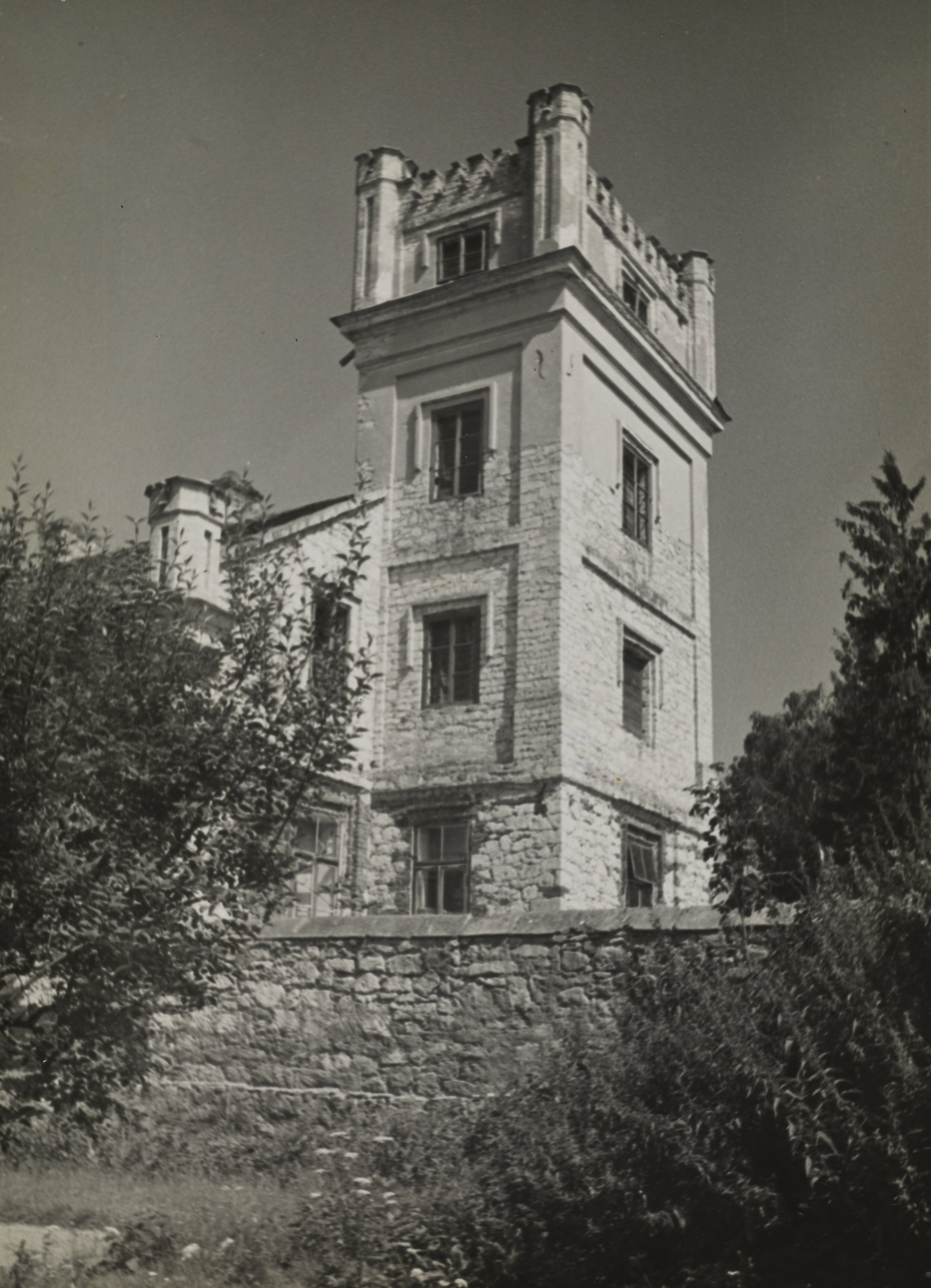
Th manor house, circa 1936
