= Bosowice =

- Village
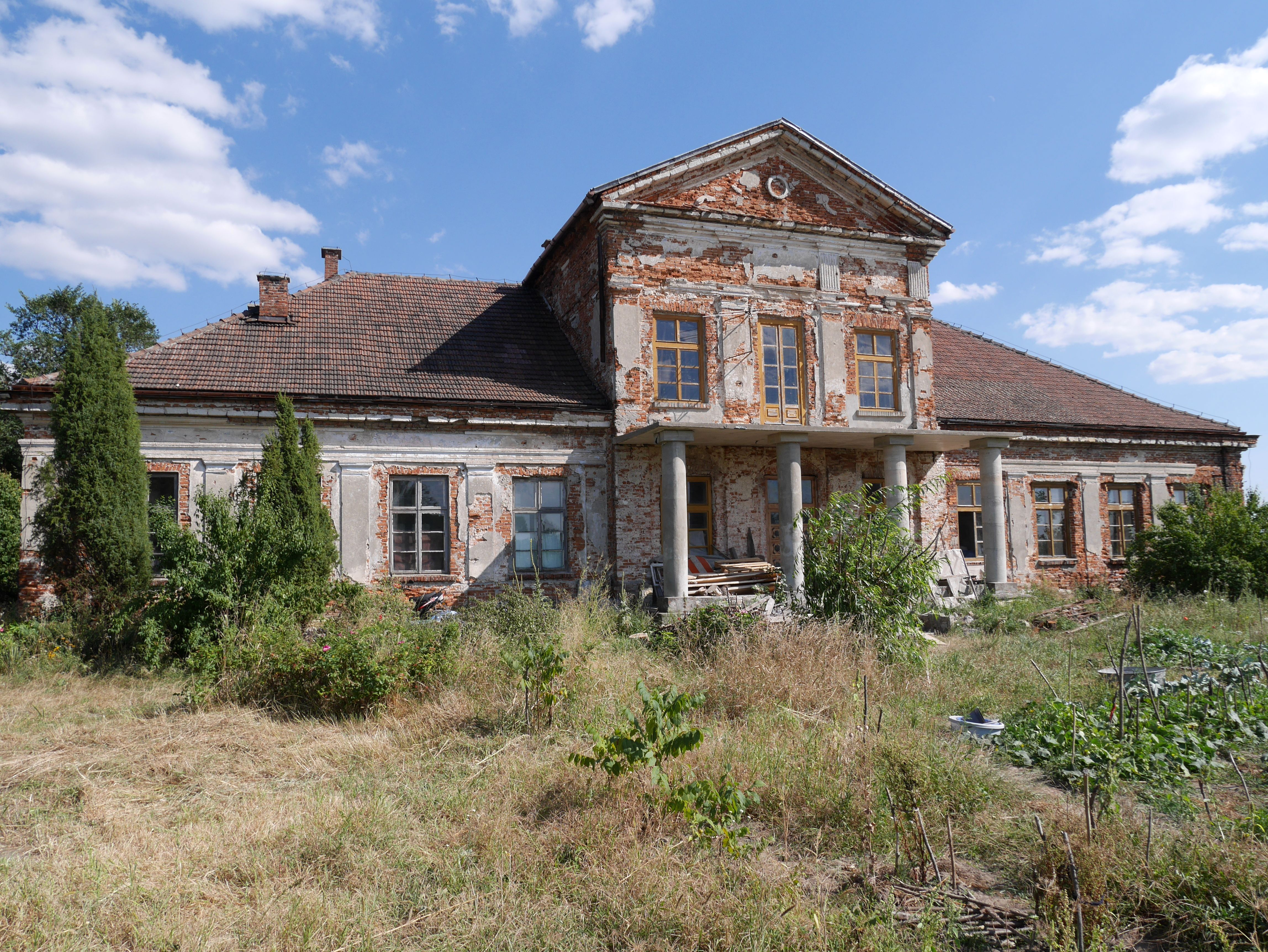
- Manor house

- Location within Poland
- Coordinates: 50°31′37″N 20°53′11″E
- Country: Poland
- Voivodeship: Świętokrzyskie
- County: Busko
- Gmina: Stopnica
- Population (approx.): 200

Bosowice [bɔsɔˈvit͡sɛ] is a village in the administrative district of Gmina Stopnica, within Busko County, Świętokrzyskie Voivodeship, in south-central Poland. It lies approximately 11 km (7 mi) north of Stopnica, 14 km (9 mi) north-east of Busko-Zdrój, and 44 km (27 mi) south-east of the regional capital Kielce.
