= Stopnica Monastery =

Monastery in Stopnica, Poland

Coordinates: 50°26′38″N 20°55′53″E

Stopnica Monastery is a stone reformist monastery in Stopnica, Poland that was founded by Krzysztof Ossoliński 1587–1645 in the seventeenth century.

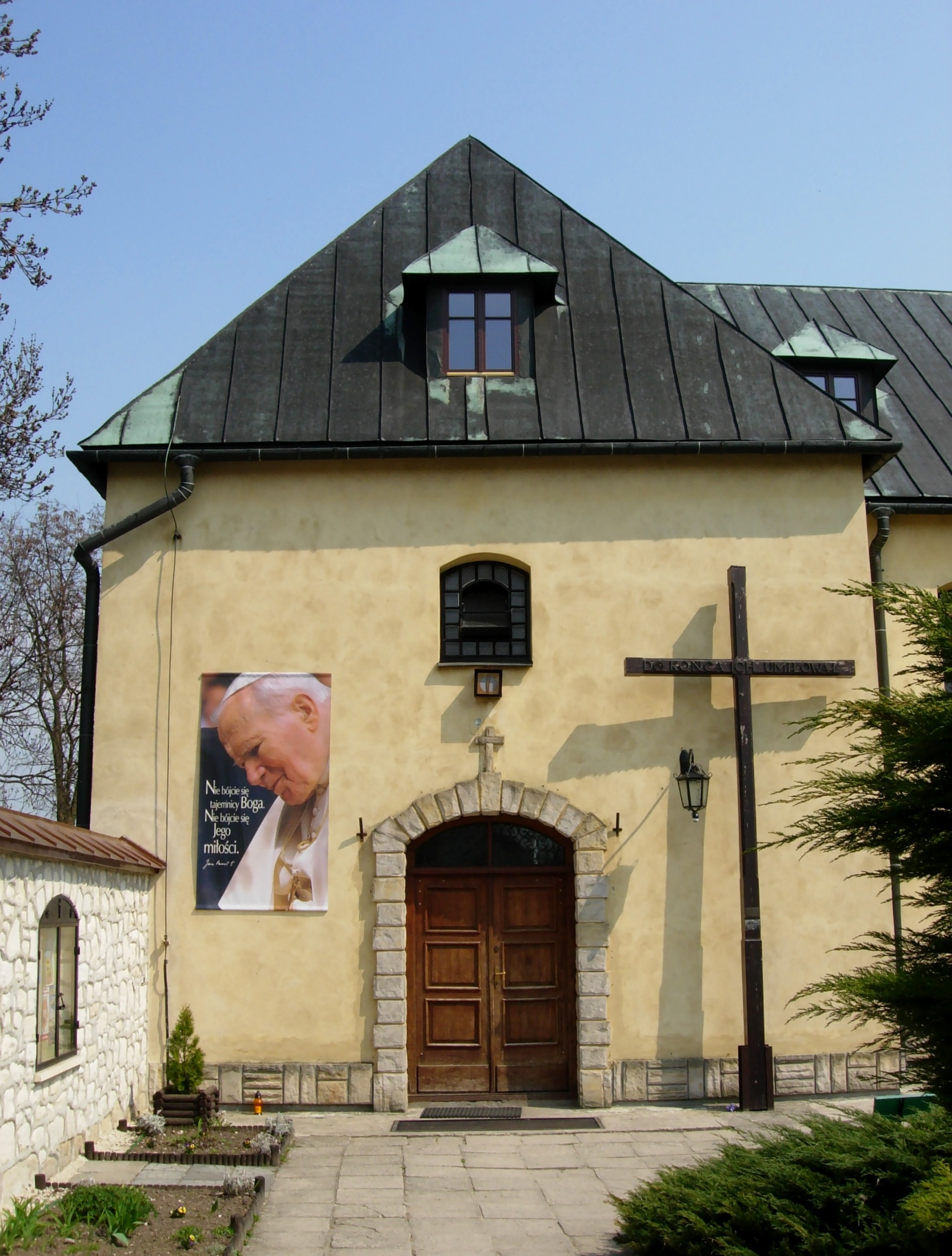
Front view of Stopnica

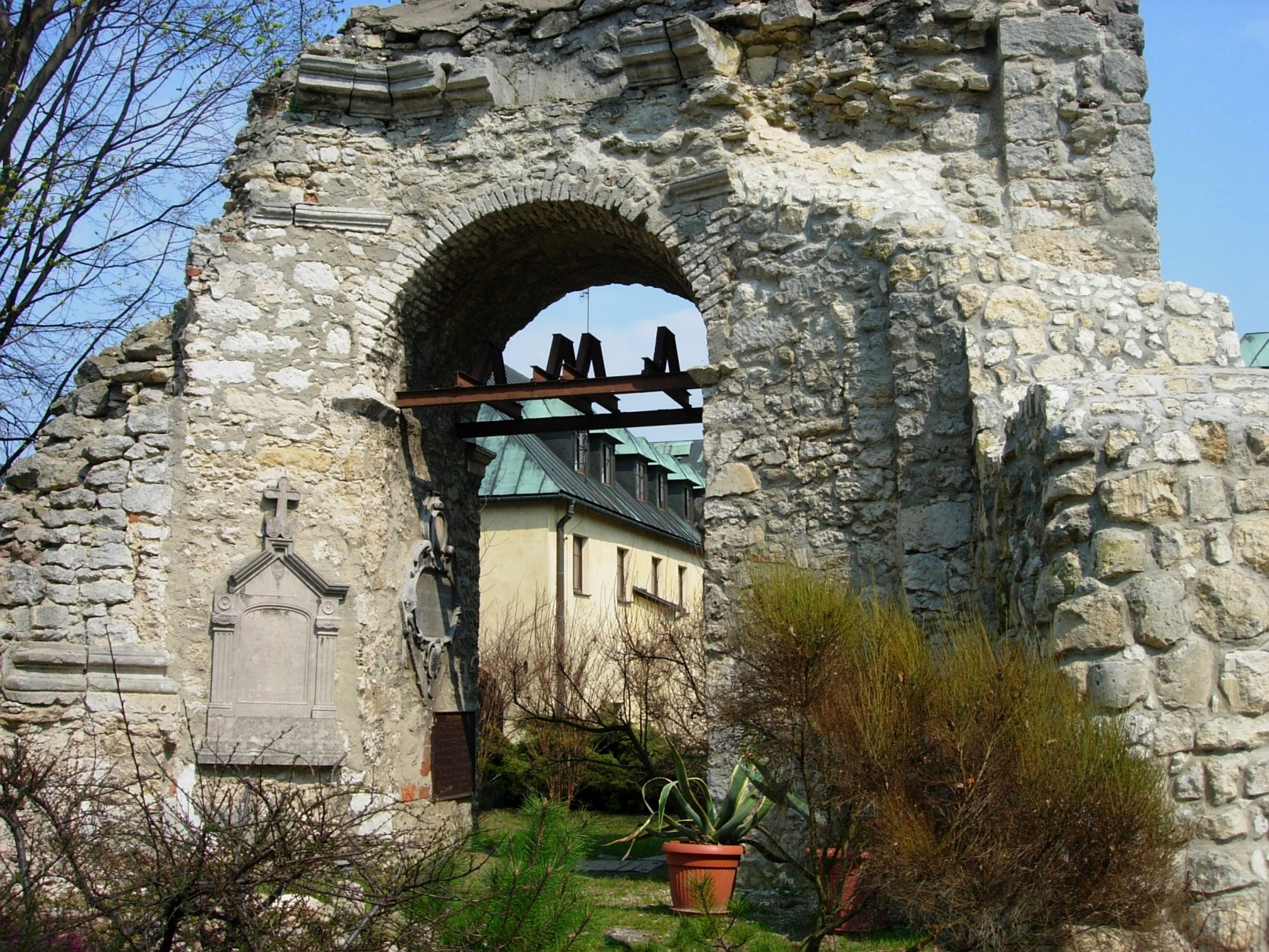
The only remaining part of the old monastery church, destroyed during World War II
