= Samuel Różycki =

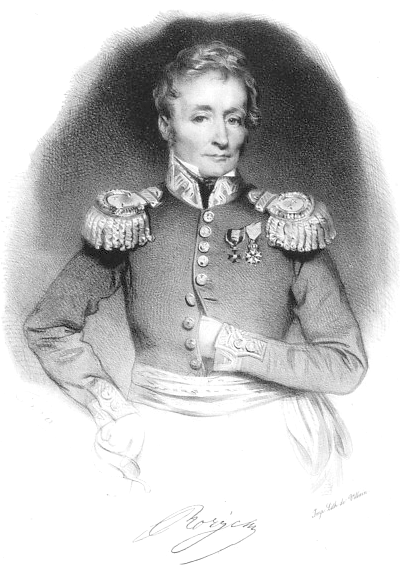

Samuel Różycki (1781 – 1834) was an officer in the Polish Legions of the Napoleonic period, then in the army of the Duchy of Warsaw and later of Congress Poland.

== Early life ==
Born on 19 June 1781 in Bosowice, he was orphaned at a young age and supervised in his studies by a guardian.

== Career ==
He joined the insurgents during the November Uprising and was one of its generals. He emigrated after its failure, first to France, then to Switzerland (he died in Bern).

He was awarded the Gold Cross of the Virtuti Militari, was made a Knight of the Legion of Honour, and received the Order of St. Stanislaus.
