= Jan of Stobnica =

Jan of Stobnica (ca. 1470 - 1530), was a Polish philosopher, scientist and geographer of the early 16th century.

== Life ==
Jan was born in Stopnica, and was educated at the Jagiellonian University (Kraków Academy), where he taught as professor between 1498 and 1514. He authored numerous works on the subjects of logic, grammar, astronomy, geography, mathematics, music, natural sciences, and ethics.

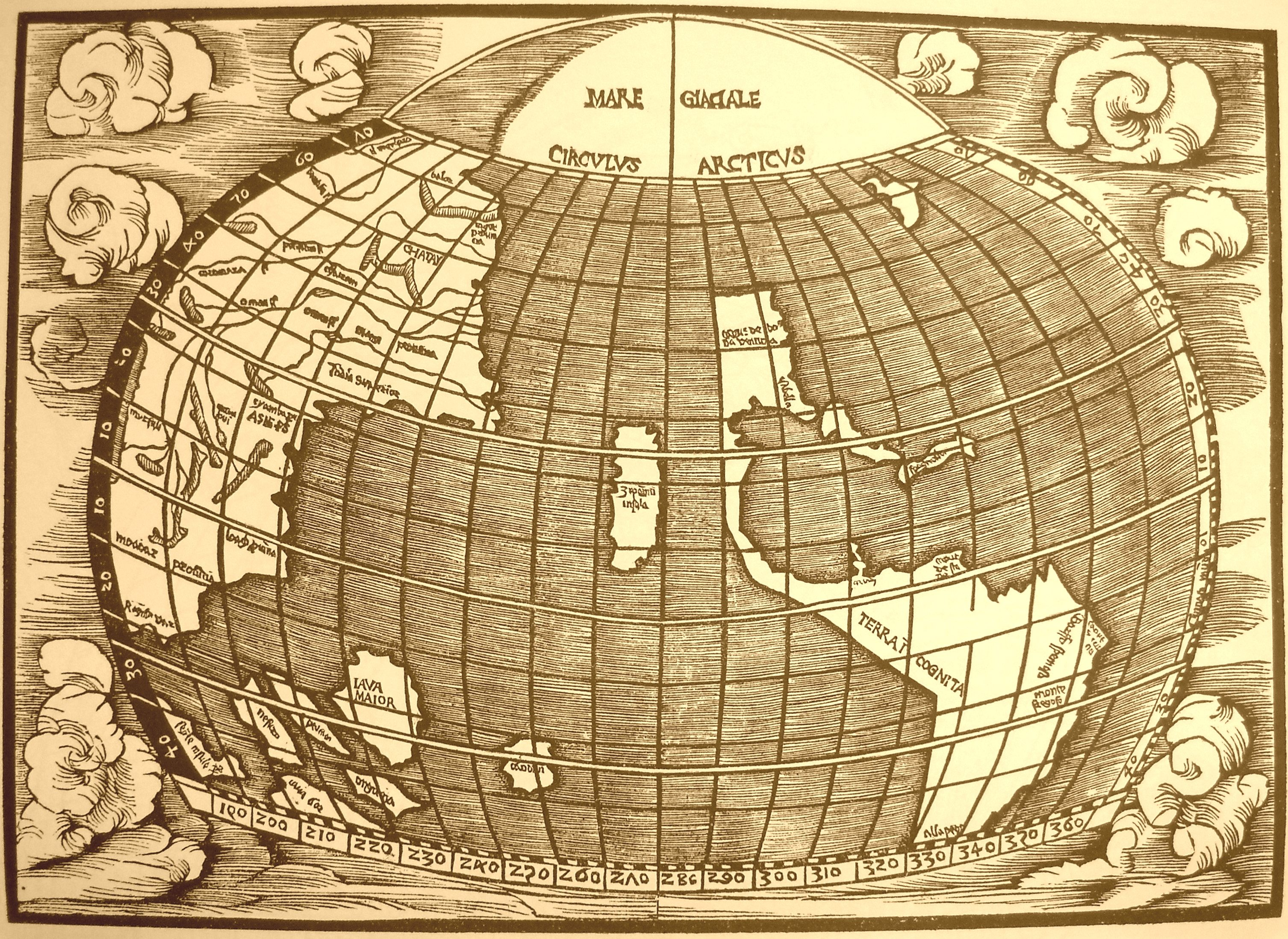
Map of the two Americas from Cosmography of Ptolemy by Jan of Stobnica, 1512

Jan of Stobnica was one of Kraków's adherents of Scotism, a philosophical school brought in from Paris first by Michał Twaróg of Bystrzyków (ca. 1450 - 1520). Jan of Stobnica became Michał's most prominent student. Jan's most famous work, entitled "Introductio in Ptholomei Cosmographiam" (Introduction to the Cosmography of Ptolemy) featured some of the first maps printed in Poland. Likewise, his edition of Ptolemy first contained a map of North and South America showing the connection of the two continents by an isthmus. It is one of the oldest known references to North America with the Gulf of Mexico delimited by the peninsula of Florida, peculiarly labeled "Isa-bella" (see engraving), which corresponds to the name of Cuba in primitive times, which in fact he left it blank. "Cosmographiam" by Jan of Stobnica, from 1512, are among some of the most precious Polonica of the New York Public Library holdings.

== Works ==
Stobnica authored a number of works on logic, grammar, astronomy, geography, mathematics, music, natural science, ethics, and theology.

=== As author ===
- Parvulus philosophiae naturalis. Kraków, drukarnia K. Hochfeder, 1503; Kraków, 1507; Kraków, 1513; Basel, 1516; Kraków, 1517.
- De praedicatione abstractorum ex sententia Scoti tam in creatis quam in divinis ac transcendentibus. Kraków, drukarnia J. Haller, 1505-1506 or 1515.
- Introductio in doctrinam doctoris subtilissimi. Kraków: drukarnia J. Haller, 1508. Also, Introductio in doctrinam doctoris subtilis. Kraków, drukarnia F. Ungler, 1512; Kraków, 1515; Kraków, 1519.
- Introductio in Ptholomei Cosmographiam cum longitudinibus & latitudinibus regionum & civitatum celebriorum. Kraków: drukarnia F. Ungler, 1512; Kraków: F. Ungler, n.d.; Kraków, 1517; Kraków, 1519.
- Generalis doctrina de modis significandi grammaticalibus. (Kraków): drukarnia J. Haller or K. Hochfeder, n.d. (before 1508?); Kraków, 1515; Kraków, 1519.

=== As editor ===
- Michał z Bystrzykowa. Questiones in libros analyticorum priorum et elenchorum Aristotelis. Kraków: drukarnia K. Hochfeder, 1505; Kraków, 1511.
- Michał z Bystrzykowa. Questiones in libros analyticorum posteriorum et topicorum Aristotelis. Kraków: drukarnia J. Haller, 1505; Kraków, drukarnia J. Haller, n.d. (1511?, 1520?).
- Questiones veteris ac novae logicae cum resolutione textus Aristotelis clarissima: ad intentionem doctoris Scoti. Kraków: drukarnia J. Haller, 1508; Kraków, 1507
- Bruni Leonard Arentius. In moralem disciplinam introductio familiari Johannis de Stobnicza commentario explanata. Kraków: drukarnia J. Haller, 1511; Vienna, 1515; Kraków, 1517.

=== Works with questionable authorship ===
- Historia totius vitae et passionis Domini nostri Jesu Christi. Ex quatuor Evangelisticis cellecta a fratre Joanne de Stobnica. Kraków: 1523, drukarnia J. Haller; Kraków, 1525. It's not clear whether Jan of Stobnica wrote this work himself or simply published that of another author.

== See also ==
- List of Poles
