= Eugeniusz Budzyński =

Polish doctor and army officer (1893–1940)

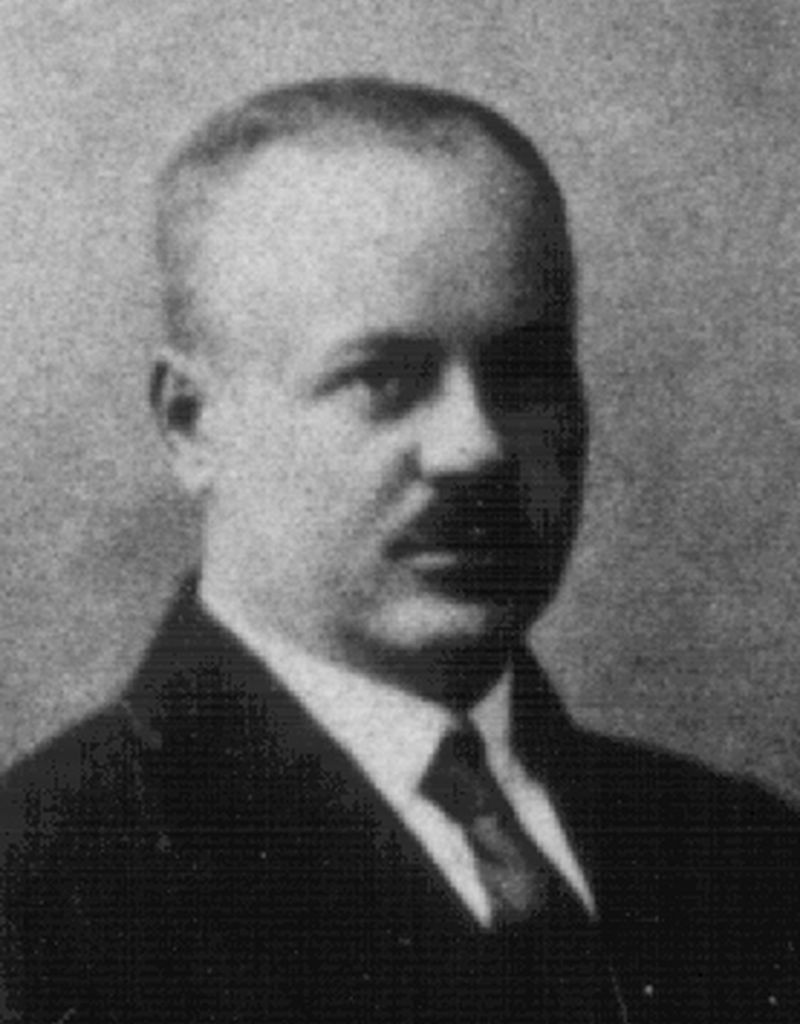
- Eugeniusz Budzynski
- Born: 14 January 1893; Kobiela, Russian Empire (now Poland)
- Died: April 1940 (aged 47); Kozelsk, Russia
- Occupations: Balneologist, neurologist, internist and major in the Polish Army
- Children: Witold

Eugeniusz Budzyński [ˈɛuɡɛniuˈsz ˈbudzɨˈɲski] (14 January 1893 – April 1940) was a Polish balneologist, neurologist, internist and major in the Polish Army. He was killed in the Katyn massacre.

== Biography ==
Son of Eugeniusz and Leokadia of the Łapinkiewicz family. He studied medicine at the University of Tartu and obtained his doctor's degree in 1917. During his studies he was a member of the "Polonia" organization and the "Lechicja" academic corporation.

From 1922 to 1928, the head of the Railway Hospital in Wilno on the city district "Wilcza Łapa", he was also a doctor at the Sickness Fund. In 1924 he was awarded a doctorate in medicine at the University of Warsaw. Since 1928 he has been a spa doctor at the National Spa Institute in Busko-Zdrój. He published about the healing properties of mineral waters in Polish spas. In 1929, near the Marconi sanatorium, Budzyński built a boarding house "Sanato". Many famous people stayed there for treatment, including Ludwik Solski, who dedicated one of his poems to the Budzyński family in 1932. In 1937 he was appointed a member of the State Council for Health Resorts by the Minister of Social Welfare.

After the outbreak of World War II, Budzynski became the commander of a field hospital. After the Soviet invasion of Poland on 17 September 1939, he was taken prisoner near Lwów and transported to the camp in Kozelsk. He was murdered in Katyn, his body was identified at the exhumation.

== Awards ==
- Silver Cross of the Order of Virtuti Militari (no. 14384) - collective, posthumous decoration of Polish soldiers murdered in Katyn and other unknown places of execution awarded by the President of the Republic of Poland in Exile Professor Stanisław Ostrowski (11 November 1976)
- September Campaign Cross - a collective posthumous commemoration of all victims of the Katyn massacre (1 January 1986)
