= Michał Twaróg of Bystrzyków =

Polish philosopher

Michał Twaróg of Bystrzyków (Polish: 'Michał Twaróg z Bystrzykowa'; Latin: Michael vulgo Parisiensis de Majori Bystrzyków) (c. 1450–1520) was a Polish philosopher and theologian of the early 16th century.

== Life ==
Michał Twaróg studied at Paris in 1473–77, during the period when, following the anathematization of the Nominalists (1473), the Scotist school of philosophy enjoyed its greatest triumphs there. He brought Scotism to Poland and taught at the Jagiellonian University in Kraków from 1485, serving as its rector in 1513–14.

Twaróg was the author of many works of philosophy and theology revered by contemporary historians. As the abbot of the collegiate church in Wojnicz (1497–1520) he supported financially the functioning of the local hospital. A prominent student of Twaróg was Jan of Stobnica (c.1470–1519), a moderate Scotist, professor at the same Jagiellonian University (Kraków Academy) between 1498 and 1514, who took account also of the theories of the Ockhamists, Thomists and Humanists.

== See also ==
- List of Poles
