= Stopnica =

- Town
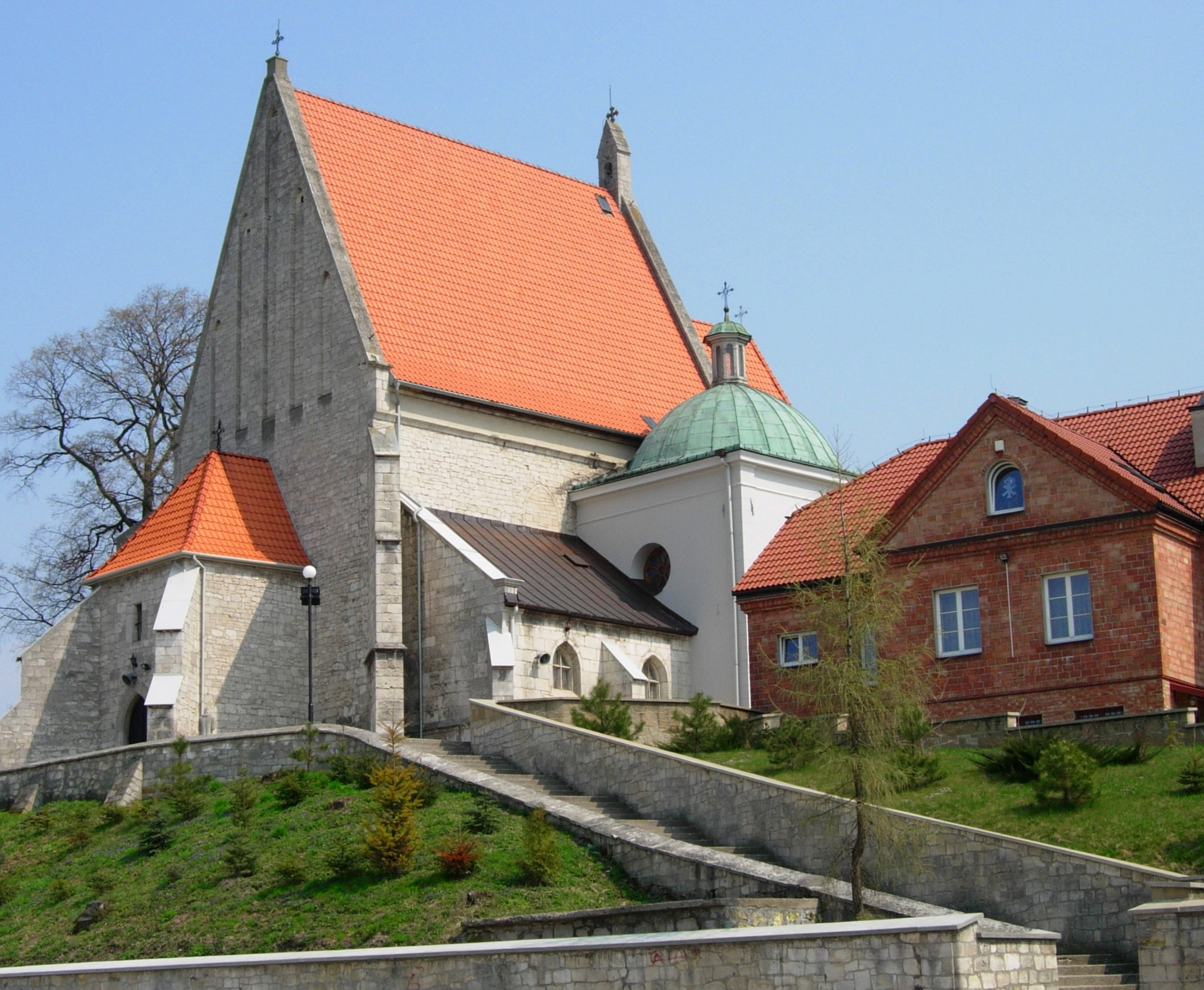
- Saints Peter and Paul Church in Stopnica

- Coat of arms

- Location within Poland
- Coordinates: 50°26′21″N 20°56′26″E
- Country: Poland
- Voivodeship: Świętokrzyskie
- County: Busko
- Gmina: Stopnica

Population
  - Total: 1,545
- Time zone: UTC+1 (CET)
  - Summer (DST): UTC+2 (CEST)
- Vehicle registration: TBU

Stopnica [stɔpˈnit͡sa] is a town in Busko County, Świętokrzyskie Voivodeship, in south-central Poland. It is the seat of the gmina (administrative district) called Gmina Stopnica. It lies in Lesser Poland, approximately 17 km (11 mi) east of Busko-Zdrój and 55 km (34 mi) south-east of the regional capital Kielce.

== Location and name ==
In the Middle Ages, Stopnica used to be one of the major urban centers of Lesser Poland’s Sandomierz Voivodeship. The town is located 15 kilometers east of Busko-Zdrój, on the Stopniczanka river, along National Road nr. 73. Stopnica is a road hub, where the road nr. 73 crosses local roads 756 and 757. The name of the town most probably comes from the early Slavic word stob, which was associated with settlements located near marshes, lakes and rivers. Unlike the contemporary town, early Stopnica was not located on a hill, but in the valley of the Stopniczanka, among marshes and ponds.

== History ==
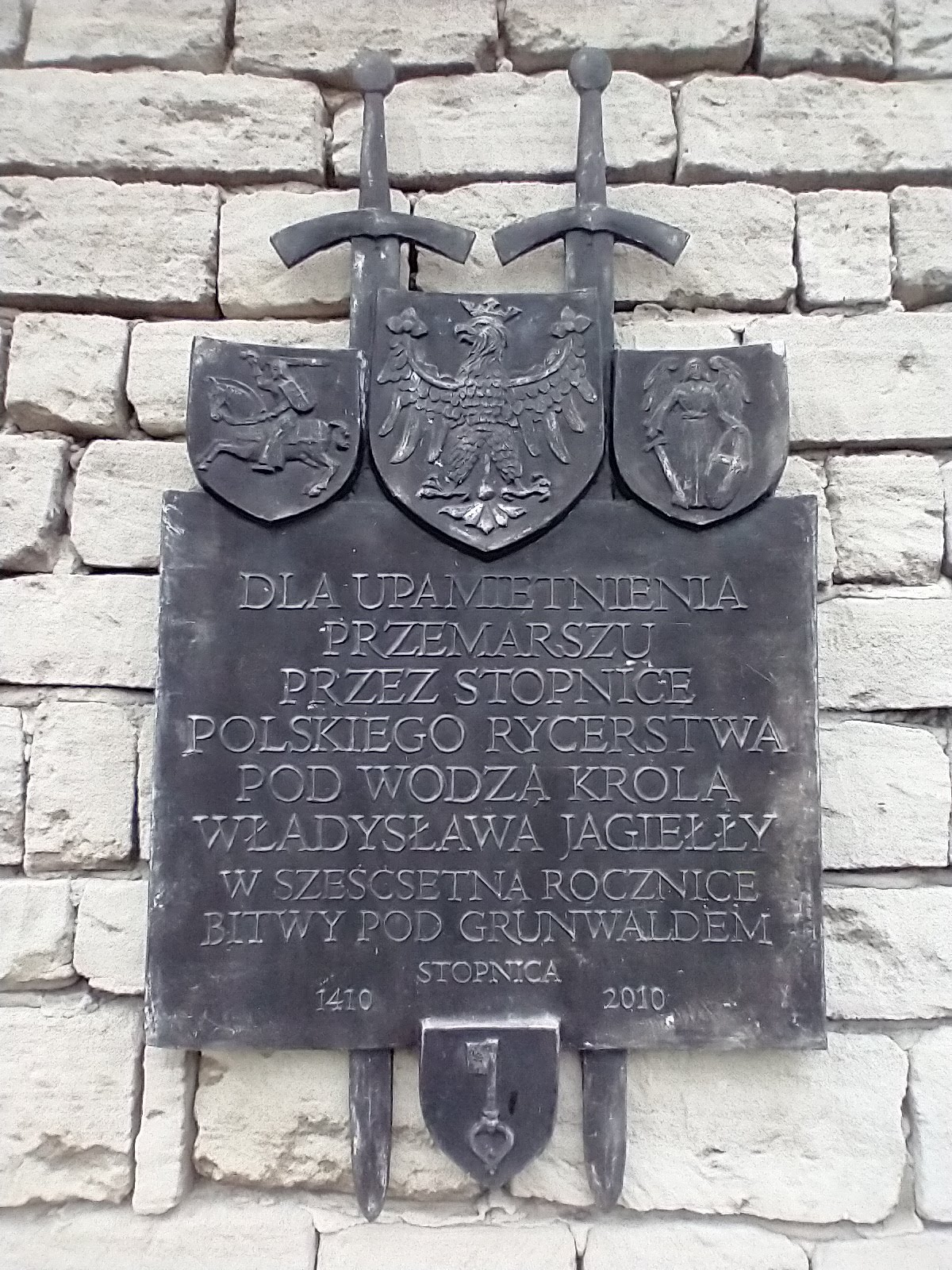
Plaque commemorating the march of Polish knights led by King Władysław II Jagiełło through Stopnica towards Grunwald in 1410

The first mention of Stopnica (known then as Stobnica) comes from the 12th century, but a gord, or Slavic settlement, had existed here earlier. According to Jan Długosz’s chronicle Annales seu cronici incliti regni Poloniae, in 1103, the parish priest of Stopnica, the Right Reverend Baldwin, became the Bishop of Kraków. In 1362, Stopnica was granted civic rights by King Casimir III the Great. On the king’s order, a castle, a hospital and a Gothic church were built here. It was a royal town of the Kingdom of Poland, administratively located in the Wiślica County in the Sandomierz Voivodeship in the Lesser Poland Province. In 1498, King John I Albert confirmed the status of Stopnica. At that time, it was the seat of a starosta, and the town enjoyed several privileges granted to it by the kings of the Jagiellon dynasty (1410, 1439, 1442, 1444, 1445, 1487, 1520). In 1470, Jan of Stobnica, later professor of the Jagiellonian University, was born here.

Together with several other locations in Lesser Poland, Stopnica in the 16th century was one of the centers of the Protestant Reformation. A Calvinist church was founded here in 1551 by Marcin Zborowski, an influential nobleman, voivode of Kalisz. In 1649, King John II Casimir confirmed the town status of Stopnica, and banned Jews from settling in the market square and around the parish church. Stopnica maintained its position of an important urban center of Sandomierz Voivodeship, but the town declined in the 1650s, during the Swedish invasion of Poland. Firstly, it was looted and burned by the Swedes, then more destruction was brought by the Transilvanian troops of George II Rakoczi. To make matters worse, in 1662 a plague decimated the population. After its complete destruction, Stopnica never recovered. In 1787, the town was visited by King Stanisław II Augustus, and, on 10 April 1795, Stopnica almost completely burned.

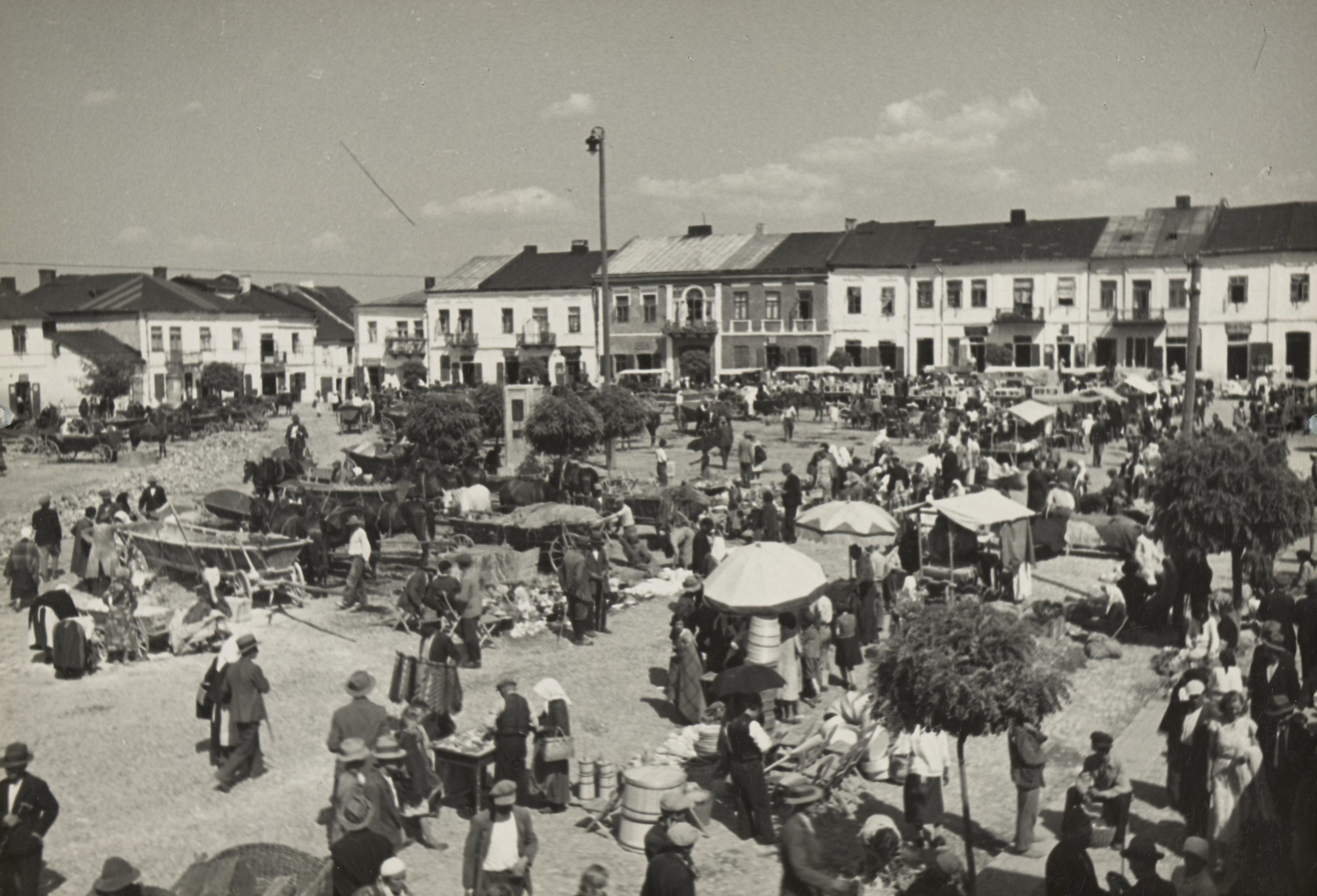
Stopnica in the 1930s

After the Third Partition of Poland, Stopnica was annexed by the Austrian Empire, but following the Polish victory in the Austro-Polish War of 1809, it was regained by Poles and included within the short-lived Duchy of Warsaw, within which it became the seat of a county. After the duchy's dissolution in 1815, it fell to the Russian-controlled Congress Kingdom. Residents of Stopnica County actively supported the January Uprising of 1863, forming a regiment of infantry. As a punishment, the Russians reduced Stopnica to the status of a village, which nevertheless remained the seat of the county until 1915, when the Austrians replaced the county seat with Busko-Zdrój.

=== World War II ===
In 1939, Stopnica had 6,142 inhabitants, of whom two thirds were Jewish.

On 9 September 1939, the German VIII Army Corps reached the vicinity of Stopnica and were met by troops of the "Śląsk" Operational Group ( "Kraków" Army ). The German 5th Armored Division moved through the city itself, where they battled by the 1st Battalion of 203 Reserve Infantry Regiment ( Battalion ON "Tarnowskie Góry" ).

In 1941–42, in the vicinity of the old cemetery in Stopnica, the Nazis established a ghetto where they kept about 5,000 Jews. In October 1942, the Germans started transporting the Jewish people from Stopnica County to the Treblinka extermination camp. In Stopnica, the extermination started on 5 November 1942. Having surrounded the village, the Germans pulled out the Jews from all the houses and herded them in the Square from where they chased them to a railway station in Szczucin. The elderly, the poor and mothers with small children were shot to death during stopovers.

In 1944, fierce fighting was fought for the Baranów-Sandomierz bridgehead near Stopnica. The Germans, trying to destroy the bridgehead, bombed Stopnica, and then sent six armored divisions against the troops of the 5th Army of General Guard, General Alexei Nizh. On 13 August 1944, the Germans attacked in the direction of Stopnica. The Panzerkampfwagen VI B Königstiger was used here for the first time. The use of a new type of weapon was not successful - the attackers lost 12 tanks, including 3 were captured by Soviet soldiers. On 7 November 1944, the Nazis blew up the mined monastery. Another offensive that the east finished the destruction.

During World War II, Stopnica was completely destroyed, first partially in September 1939 and later completely in the summer and autumn of 1944 when the Wehrmacht tried to halt the advancing Red Army. Not a single house survived in Stopnica. In the post-war years Stopnica was rebuilt.

In 2015 Stopnica regained town rights.

== Points of interest ==
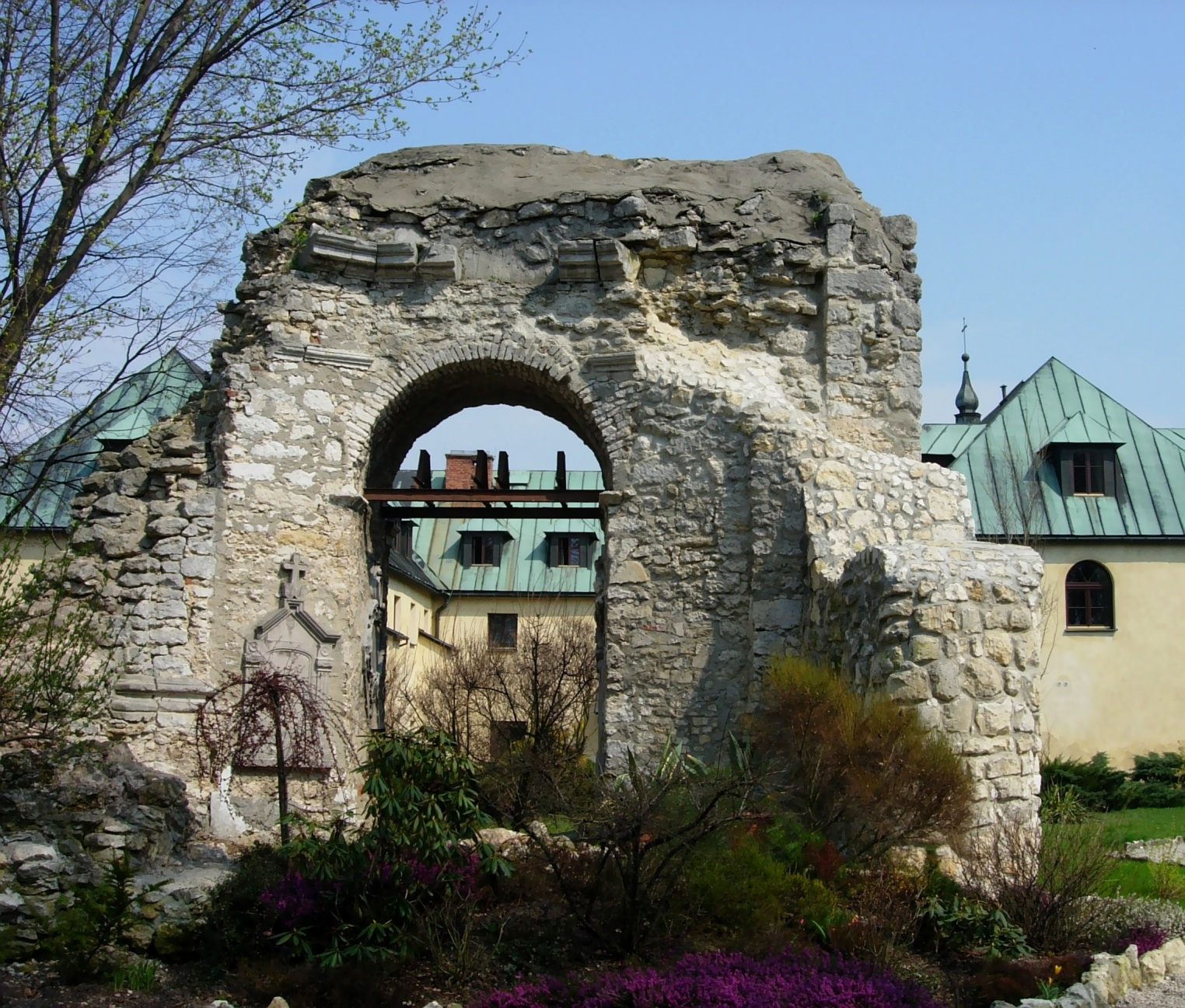
Remains of the Church of Saints Mary Magdalene and Francis, destroyed during World War II

- Gothic St. Peter and Paul church
- monastery complex
- royal castle, built by King Kazimierz Wielki in 1350. Rebuilt in Baroque style in 1661, then rebuilt again in 1783, it seated local authorities of the Stopnica County in the 19th century. The castle partially burned in 1859, and was completely destroyed in World War II. The castle is now under reconstruction.

== See also ==
- Stopnica Monastery
