= Busko-Zdrój =

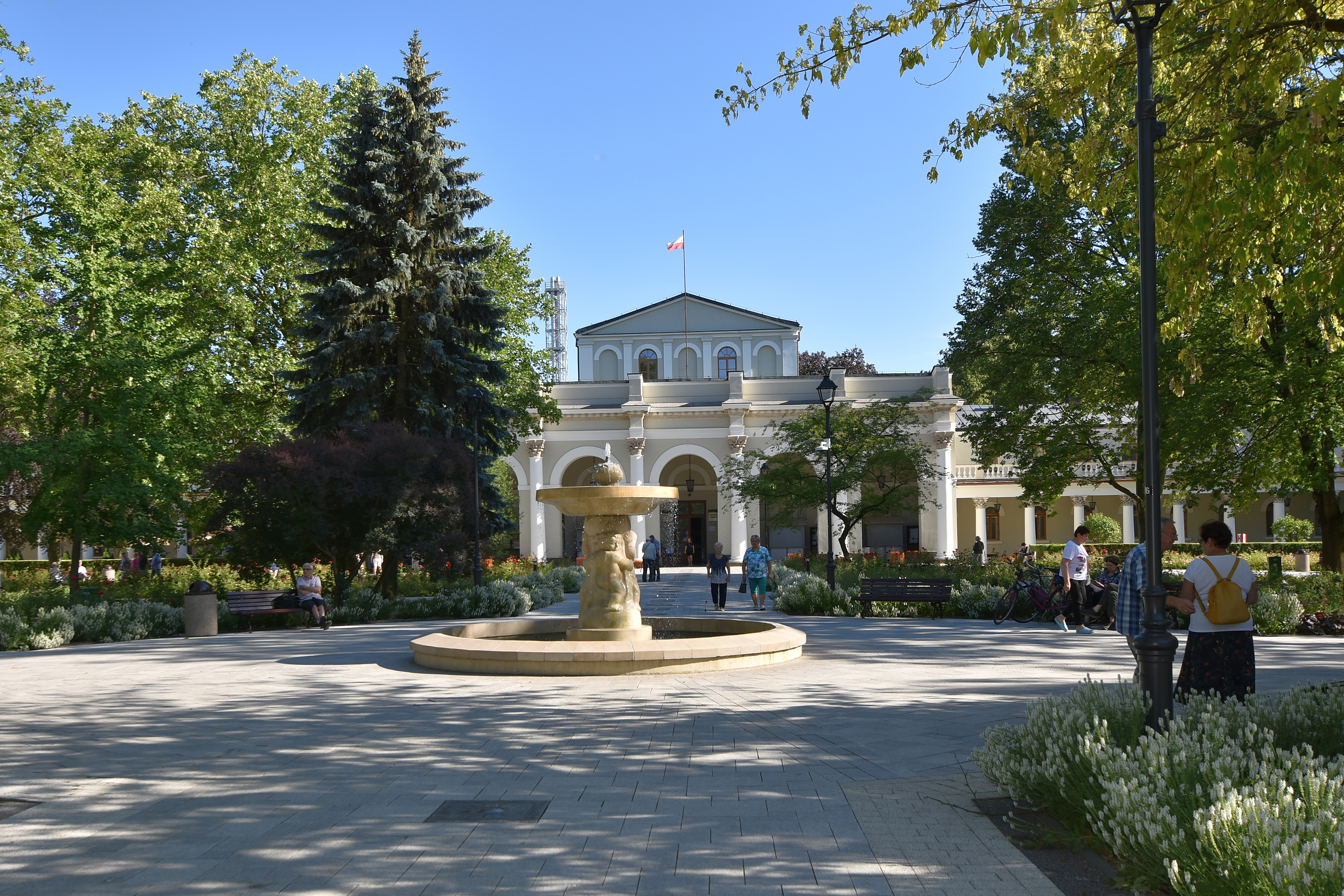
- Spa Park with Sanatorium Marconi

- Coat of arms

- Location within Poland
- Coordinates: 50°28′N 20°43′E
- Country: Poland
- Voivodeship: Świętokrzyskie
- County: Busko
- Gmina: Busko-Zdrój
- Established: 12th century
- Town rights: 1287-1869, 1916

Government
  - Mayor: Jerzy Szydłowski (Ind.)

Area
  - Total: 12.28 km^{2} (4.74 sq mi)
- Highest elevation: 250 m (820 ft)
- Lowest elevation: 220 m (720 ft)

Population (31 December 2021)
  - Total: 15,310
  - Density: 1,247/km^{2} (3,229/sq mi)
- Time zone: UTC+1 (CET)
  - Summer (DST): UTC+2 (CEST)
- Postal code: 28-100
- Area code: +48 41
- Car plates: TBU
- Website: http://www.busko.pl

Busko-Zdrój ([ˈbuskɔ ˈzdrui̯]) is a spa town in Świętokrzyskie Voivodeship, southern Poland. It is the capital of Busko County. As of December 2021, it has a population of 15,310.

== History ==
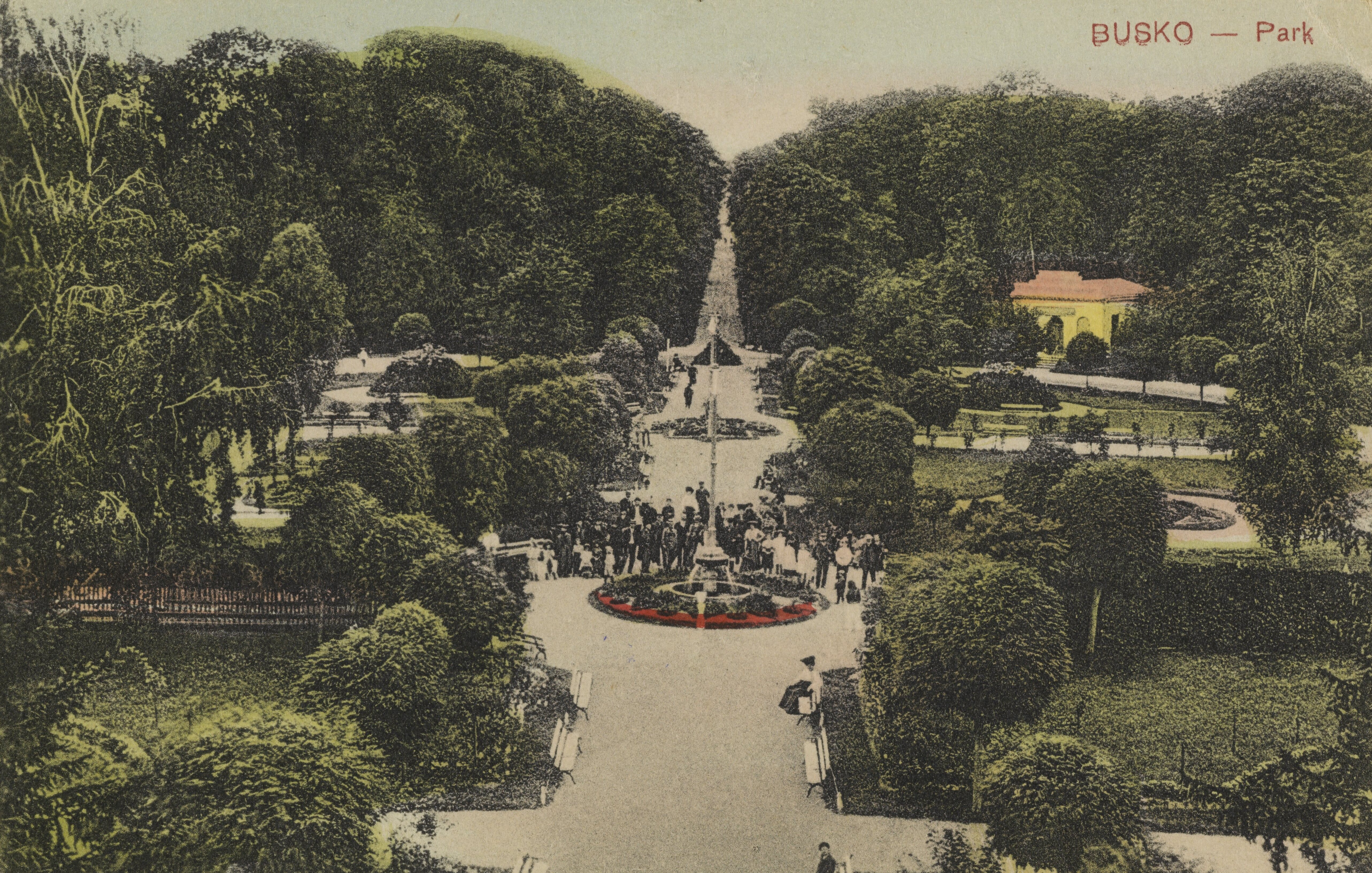
Early-20th-century view of the Spa Park

The origin of Busko goes back to the 12th century, when a group of shepherds settled around St. Leonard's church. In 1185, Knight Dersław, the owner of Busko and its surroundings, brought Norbertine nuns, whom in his will he inscribed i.a. the village of Busko. Dersław was probably killed in the Battle of Chmielnik in 1241 (see: Mongol invasion of Poland). In 1251, it received a revenue privilege from King Bolesław V the Chaste allowing the convent to use the salt water. This is the first record of the use of Busko's mineral waters.

In 1287, Busko was granted civic rights by King Leszek II the Black. The advantageous location of the town on trade routes led King Władysław Jagiełło to grant local burghers the right to have a weekly market and two fairs a year beginning in 1412. The 15th and 16th centuries were considered the "heyday" of the town. It was famous for its trade and cloth production.

=== Timeline ===
- 1166 – Dzierżko (Dersław), knight of the Janina family, founded the first church, where the NPNMP church is today.
- 1166 – The first written mention of Busko-Zdrój was made in a papal edict and recorded in Kraków's diocese chronicle about Busko-Zdrój. The record mentions a town named "Bugsk" and the church.
- 1180–1186 – Dzierżko founded the Norbertine priory attached to the church. It is a branch of the Witowski convent, which was founded by Dzierżko's brother – bishop of Płock, Wit from Chotla.
- 1252 – The oldest write-up on a salt spring in Busko. Bolesław V the Chaste granted the priory a treasure immunity and right to boil the salt.
- 1287 – Duke Leszek II the Black granted town rights to the colony and established Busko–Zdrój agreeably to law of Środa Śląska.
- 1347 – Jan from Busko became a secretary, and in 1360 he became deputy chancellor of the king Casimir III the Great.
- 1661 – The town suffered the Great Plague (Black Death).
- 1783 – Under the privilege of Royal Charter, as a result of the work of Stanisław Staszic, a salt company was founded in Busko, to produce salt on a large scale from the Busk springs.
- 1784 – King Stanisław August Poniatowski visited the town and salt-works.
- 1809 – Busko-Zdrój was incorporated into the Duchy of Warsaw.
- 1815 – Agreeable to decisions of Congress of Vienna, the town was incorporated into the Kingdom of Poland, which was annexed by Russia.
- 1819 – Seizure of the Norbertine priory. Busko, as a religious good, was transferred to the government of Poland. The government leased Busko to Feliks Rzewuski.
- 1820 – A fire burnt a large portion of the town.
- 1828 – Official opening of the health resort, with the first list of visitors.
- 1836 – Surrendered the baths to use, later location of Sanatorium "Marconi". This date marks the beginning of Busko as a health resort.
- 1869 – The town rights were lost.
- 1916 – The town rights were restored.

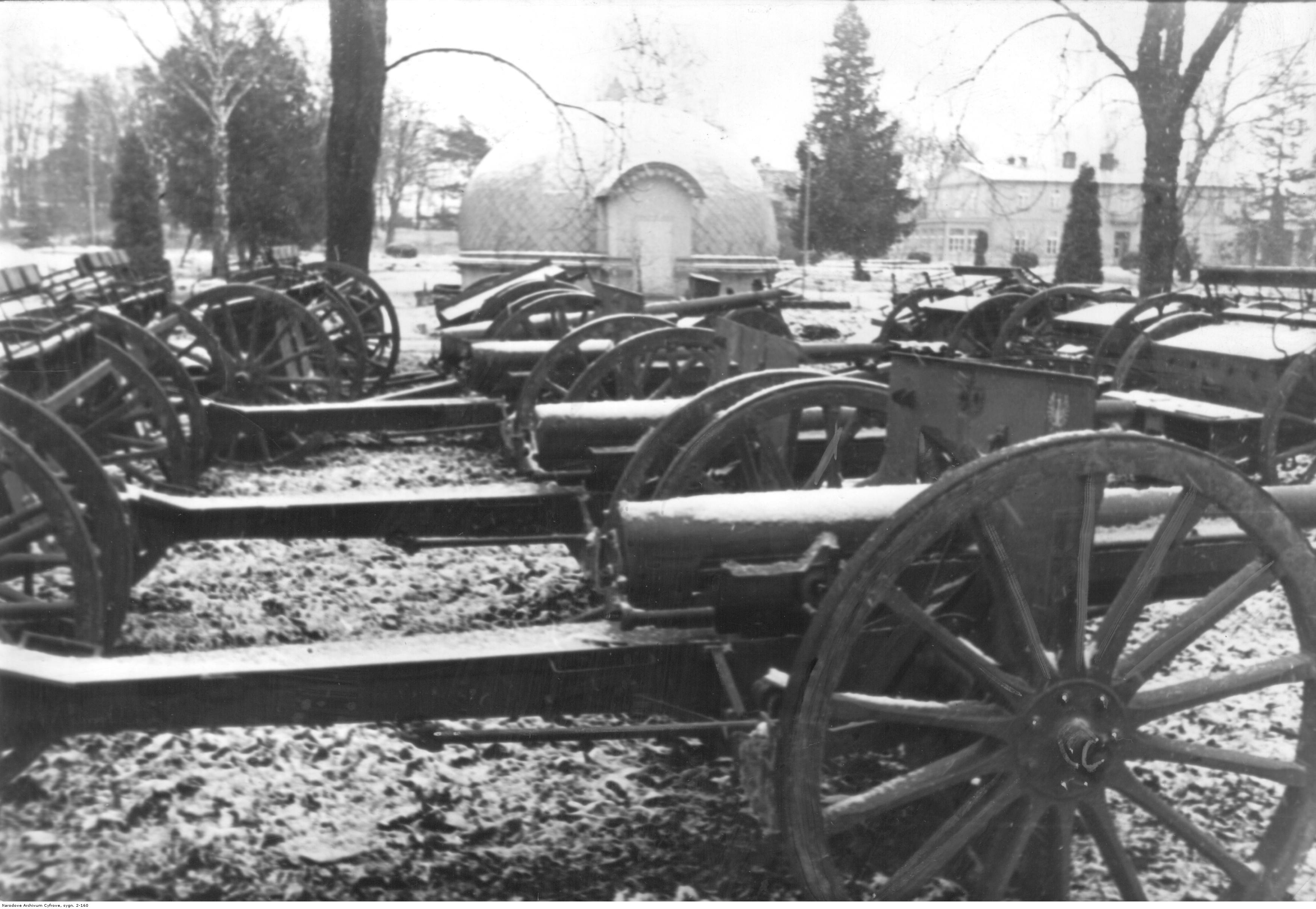
German-seized Polish armaments at the Spa Park during the German occupation

- 1939 – On 9 September, the battle of the 22nd Mountain Infantry Division against the German detachment at Bronina village. In this battle, 200 Polish soldiers died.
- 1939–1945 – German occupation during World War II
- 1945 – On 13 January, Busko was liberated by the Soviet forces (5th Guards Army, 1st Ukrainian Front)
- 1966 – Busko won first place at a competition for most beautiful health resort in Poland.
- 1987 – Celebration of the allocation of town rights.

=== Mayors ===
| date of appointment | date of appeal | position | name and surname |
|---|---|---|---|
| 1824 | 1826 | mayor | Józef Nestowicz |
| 1917 | 1918 | mayor | Ludwik Jarczyński – the first mayor after becoming independent |
| 1918 | 1939 | mayor | Kazimierz Gałdziński |
| 1981-10-12 | 1990-10-31 | chief | Stefan Komenda |
| 1990-06-18 | 1992-10-08 | mayor | Piotr Iwański |
| 1992-10-08 | 1994-07-01 | mayor | Edward Serafin |
| 1994-07-01 | 2002-11-18 | mayor | Stefan Komenda |
| 2002-11-19 | 2004-09-27 | mayor | Stefan Komenda – the first direct election of mayor |
| 2004-12-09 | 2006-12-06 | mayor | Witold Gajewski |
| 2006-12-06 | 2010-12-13 | mayor | Piotr Wąsowicz |
| 2010-12-13 | 2024-05-07 | mayor | Waldemar Sikora |
| 2024-05-07 | currently | mayor | Jerzy Szydłowski |

== Geography ==
Busko is located in the south part of the Świętokrzyskie voivodeship, 50 km (31 mi) from Kielce and 80 km (50 mi) from Kraków. The city is in the part of the Świetokrzyskie voivodeship called Ponidzie, whose name came from the river Nida.

According to information from 2002, the area of the Busko–Zdrój is 12.28 square kilometres (4.7 sq mi).

- parish: all soil – 23,588 hectares (58,287.2 acres)
- forests: 1,532 hectares (3,785.7 acres)
- waters: 207 hectares (511.5 acres)
- rivers: 16.7 hectares (41.3 acres)

Busko-Zdrój composes 4.95% of the surface area of the parish.

== Demographics ==
Detailed data as of 31 December 2021:

| Description | All | | Women | | Men | |
|---|---|---|---|---|---|---|
| Unit | person | percentage | person | percentage | person | percentage |
| Population | 15,310 | 100 | 8248 | 53.9% | 7062 | 46.1% |
| Population density | 1246.8 | | 671.7 | | 575.1 | |

== Climate ==
Busko's climate is low-lying and continental. This weather is typical about 39% of the days of the year. The number of 'hot and scorching' days -13%, 'very cold' – under 1.5%. The average year-round temperature is 7.8 °C (46.0 °F). The minimum average temperature of the year is −8.2 °C (17.2 °F). The maximum average temperature of the year is 23.4 °C (74.1 °F). In Busko, there are almost 1151 hours of sunshine per year. The average humidity is between 71% and 80%.

== Monuments ==
- Immaculate Conception church built in 1592–1621, renovated in 1820.
- St. Leonard's church built in 1699 (wooden).
- St. Anna's chapel, built from 1884 to 1886.
- Sanatorium Marconi built in 1836, designed by Enrico Marconi
- Dersław Castle – Construction of the castle began in 1911 by a doctor at the health resort Wasyl Wasylewicz Jakobs. A few years later, Leon Sulimierski finished building the castle. During the First World War, on May 13, 1915, after an offensive on Nida, General Stanisław Szeptycki, a commander in the Austrian army, arrived in Busko and set up residence in the castle.
- Villas: Bagatela, Sanato, Słowacki, Oblęgorek, Ormuzd, Zielona, Bristol
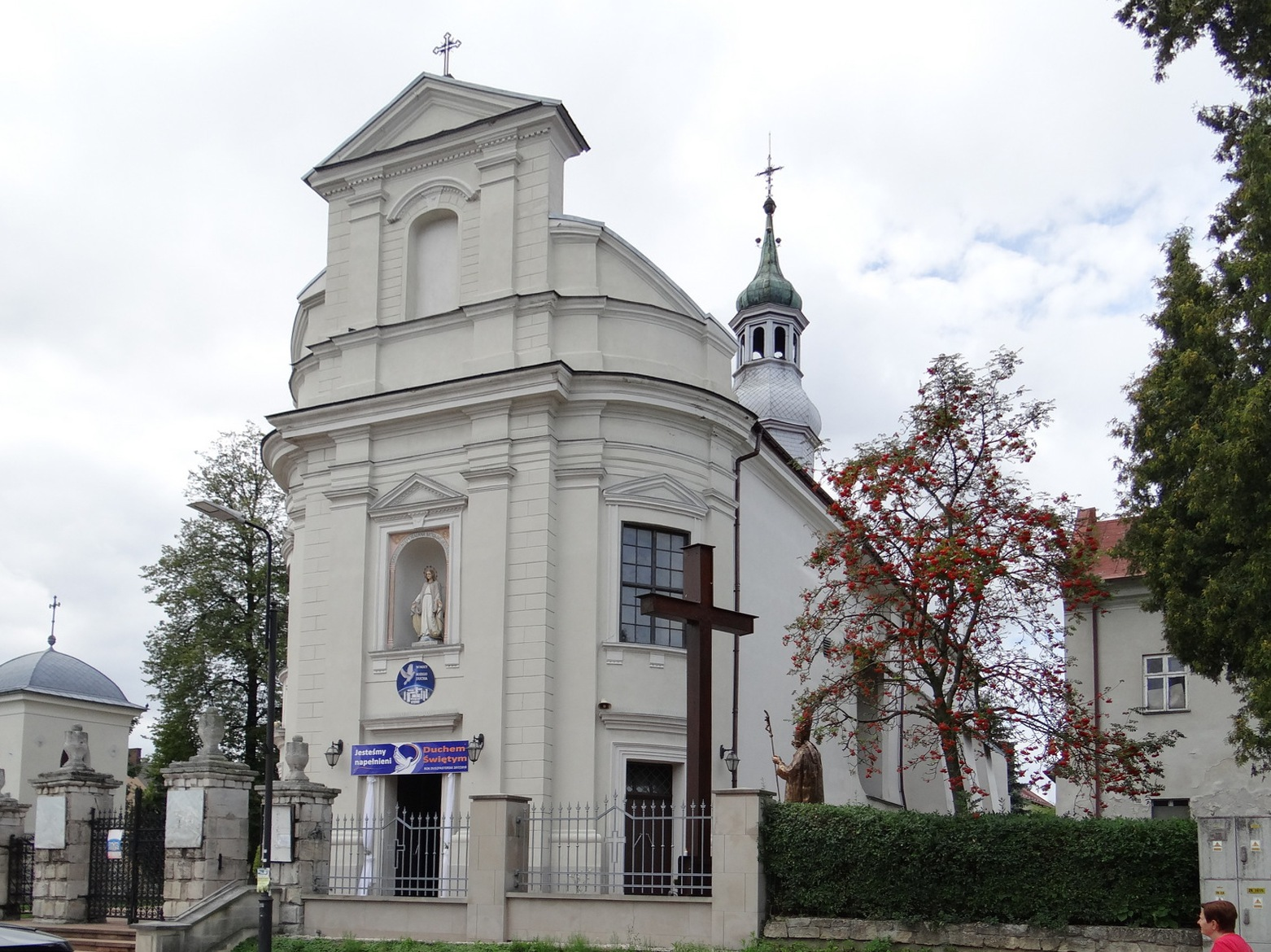
Immaculate Conception church

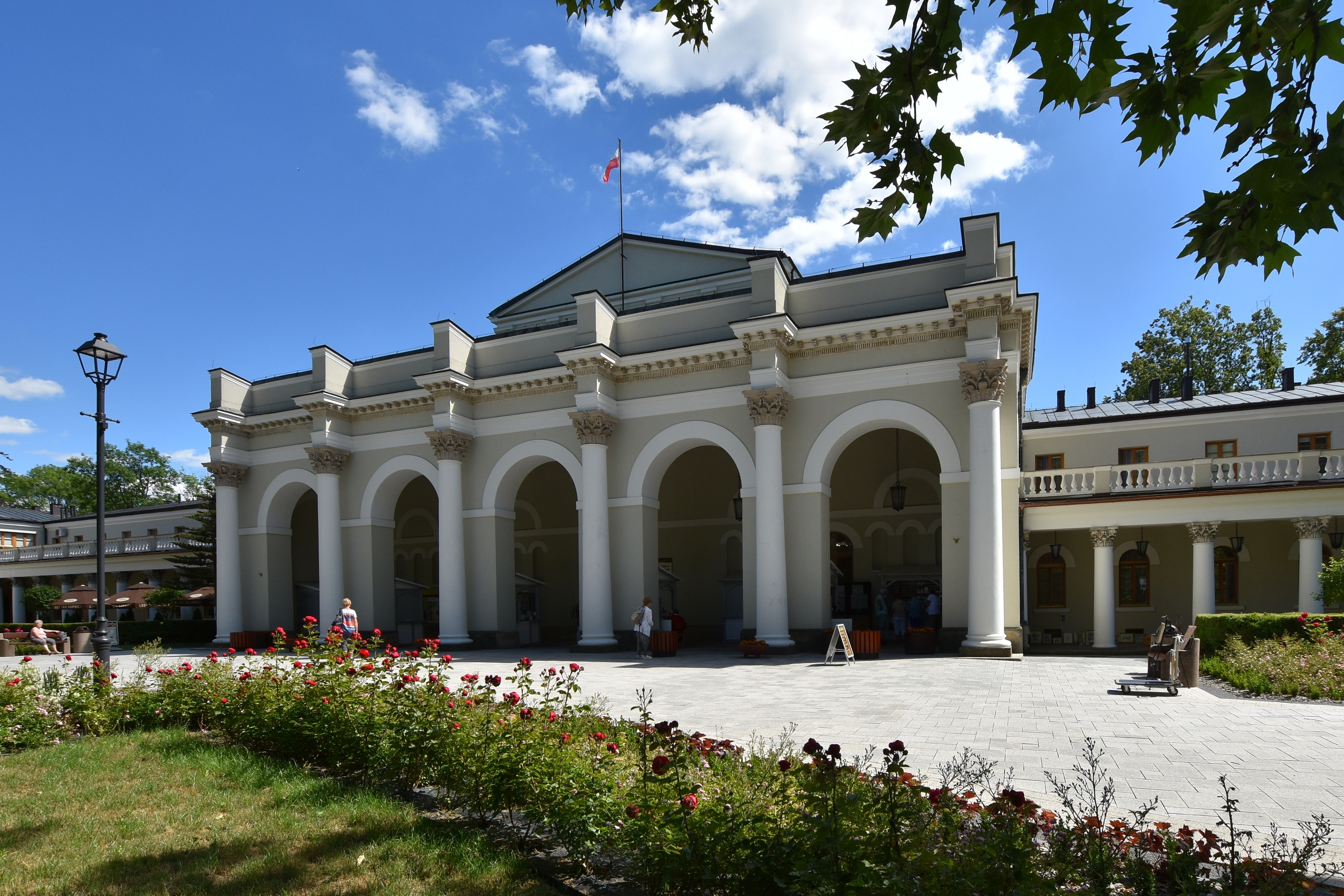
Sanatorium Marconi

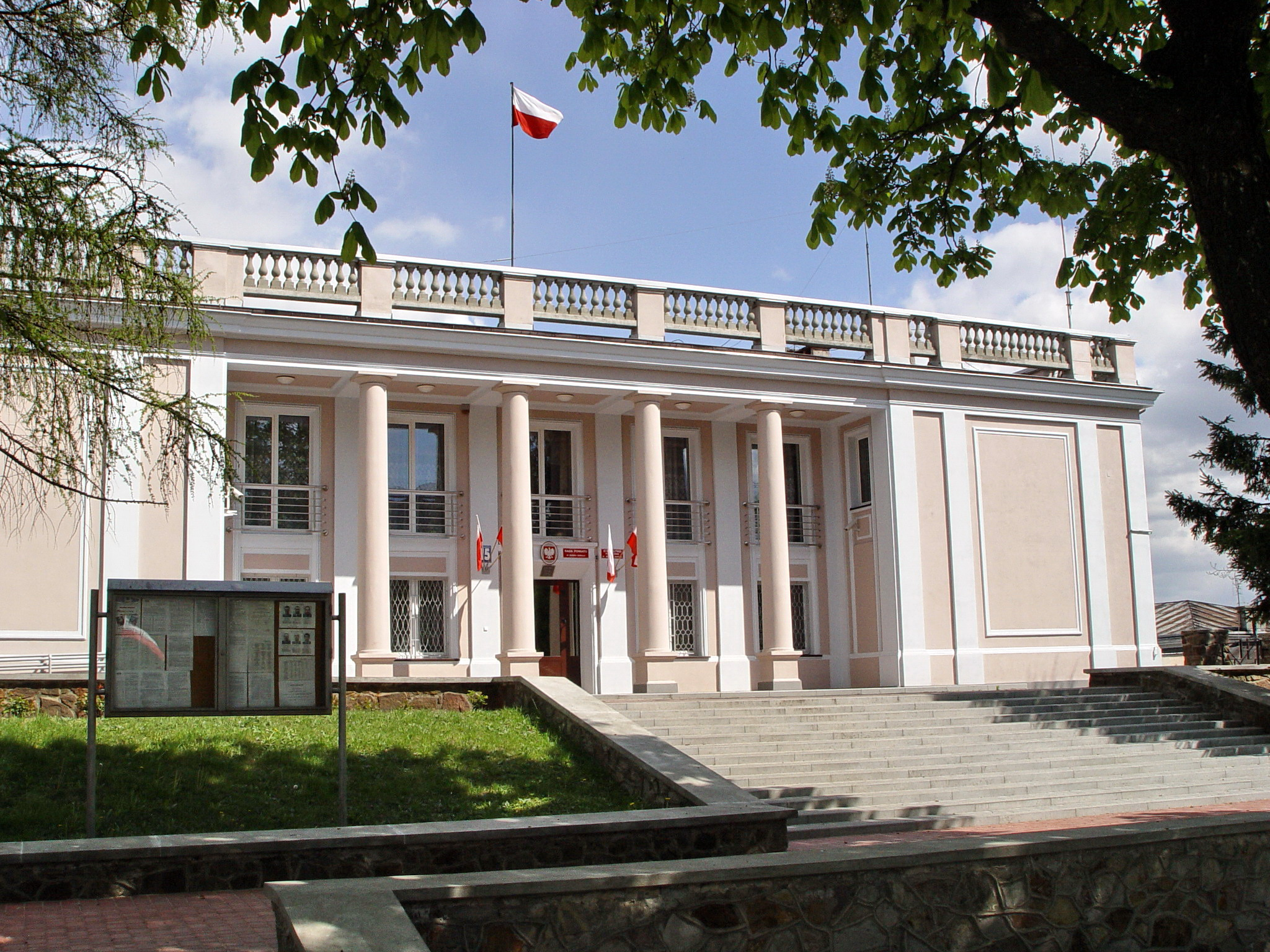
County administration building

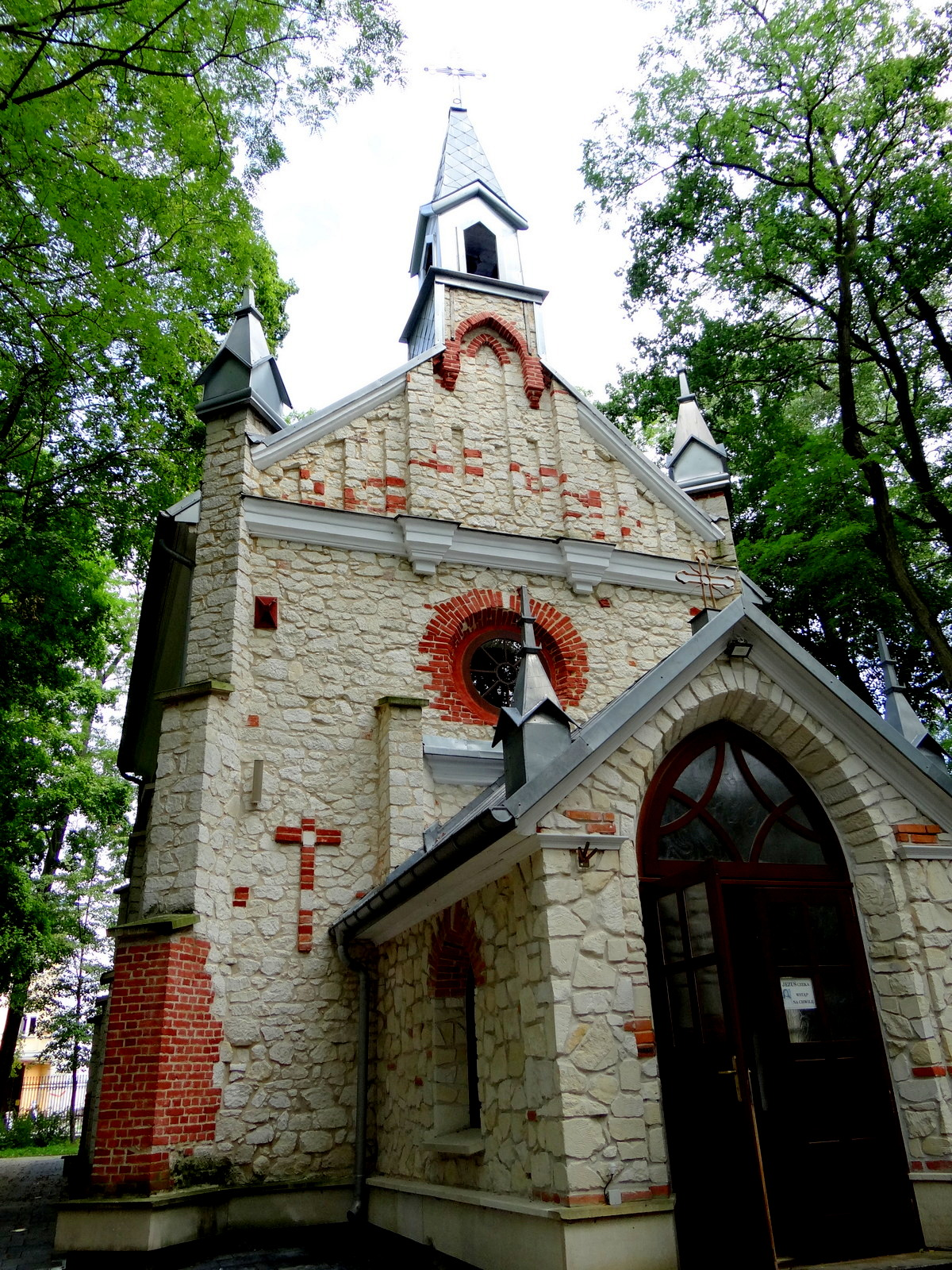
Saint Anne chapel

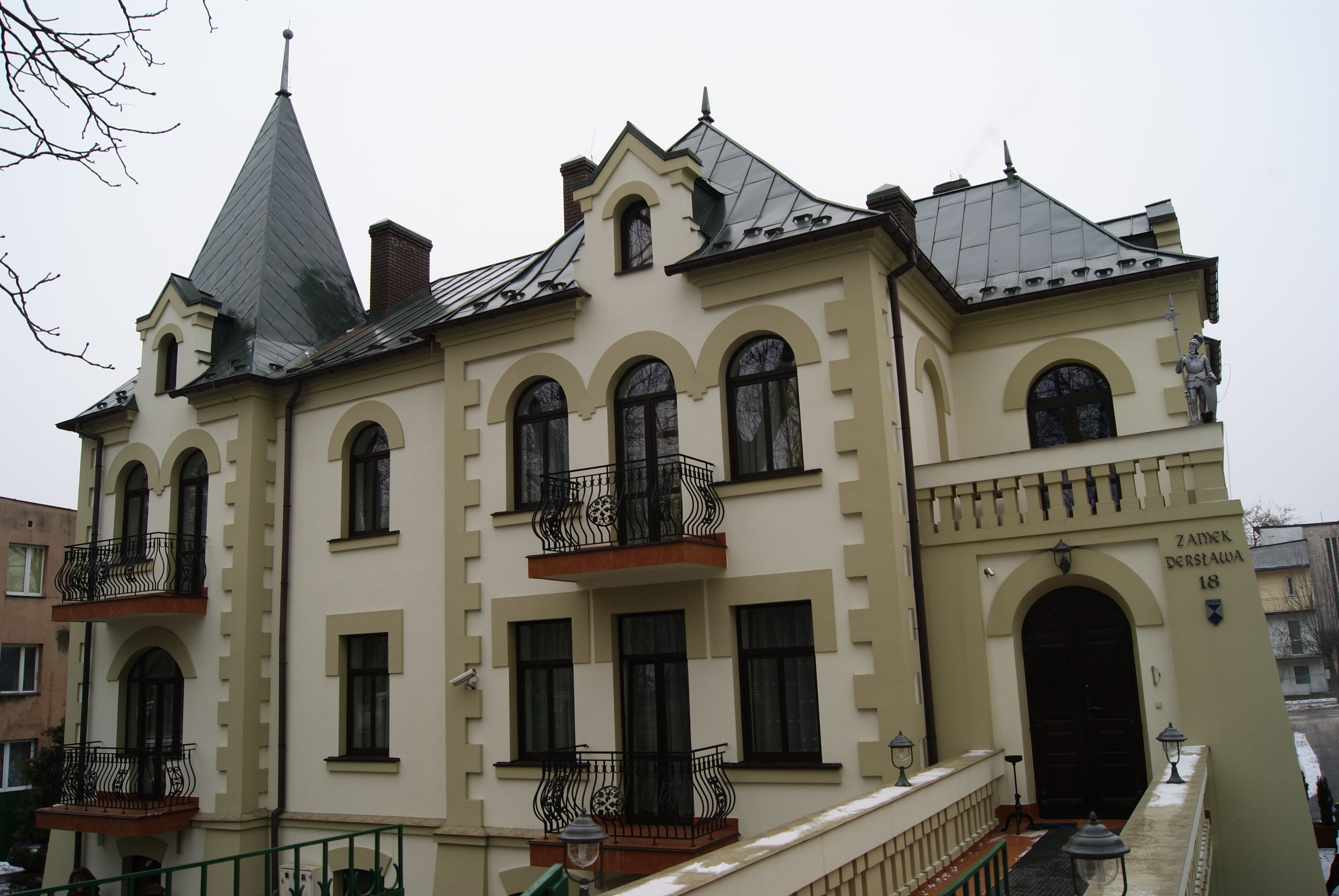
Dersław Castle

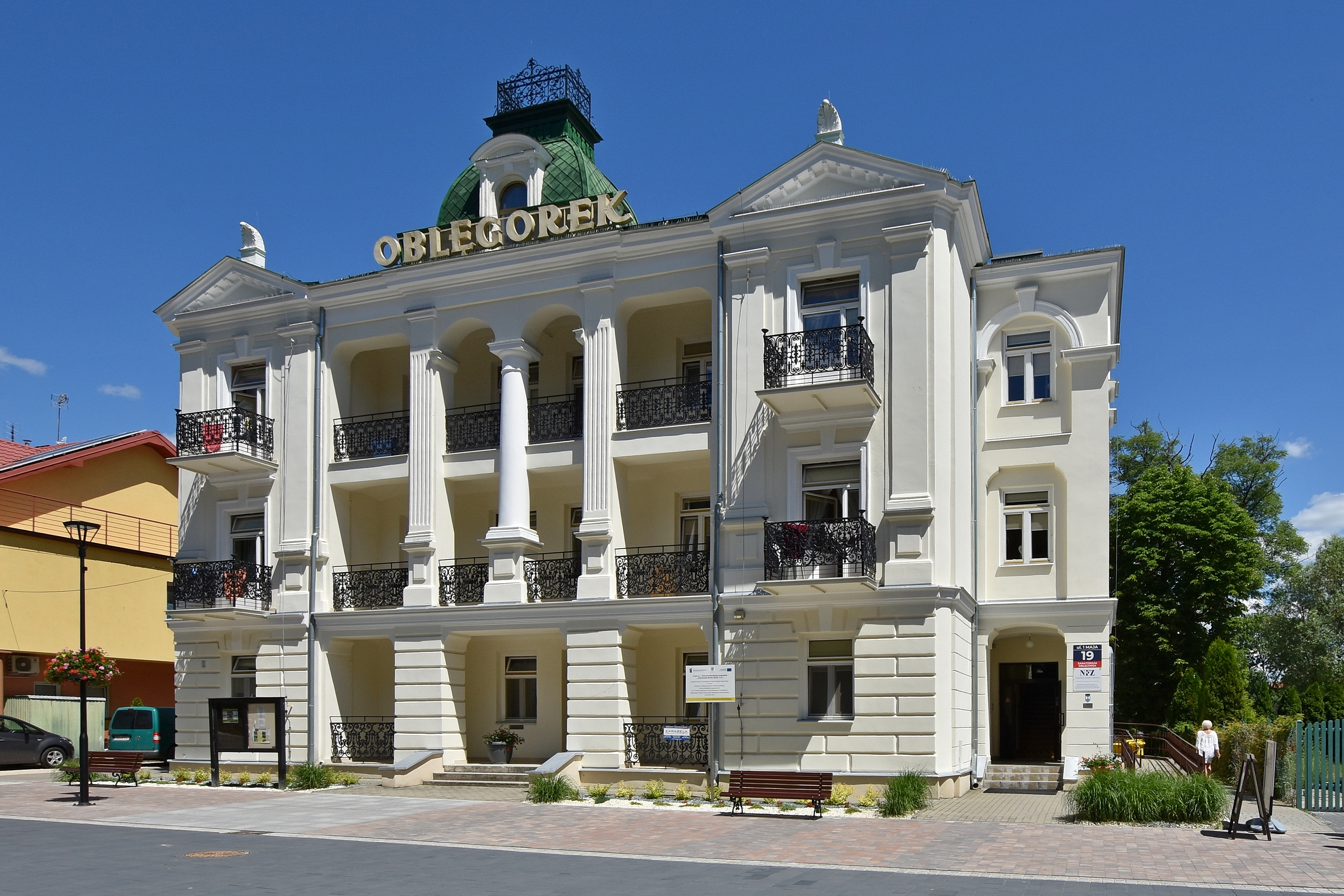
Villa Oblęgorek

== Transport ==
The national road NR73 passes through Busko between Kielce to Tarnów. It is 3.3 km (2.1 mi) long. Three regional roads also pass through Busko:

- DW767 Busko – Pińczów, 5.3 km (3.3 mi) long
- DW776 Busko – Kraków, 2.7 km (1.7 mi) long
- DW973 Busko – Żabno, 14.4 km (8.9 mi) long

The Car Transport Company in Busko has maintained 132 buses. The partnership supports long-distance connections with Warsaw, Kraków, Karpacz, Łódź, Lublin, Katowice, Tarnów, Częstochowa and Wrocław. There have been 23 registered cab companies in the municipality.

The nearest international airport is Kraków–Balice (100 km or 60 mi from Busko), in Katowice-Pyrzowice (160 km (99 mi) from Busko) and in Warsaw-Okęcie (220 km or 140 mi from Busko). In Masłów, near Kielce (50 km or 31 mi from Busko) is sport's airport. In Busko is also Airport Health in 'Łowiska'.

There is a railway from Kielce, which was built in 1953 near the city, in Siesławice. Currently, Busko's train station only supports freight trains. It was closed for passenger trains on December 12, 2004. The station was sold, and a disco was built in its place.

== Health Spa ==
=== History ===
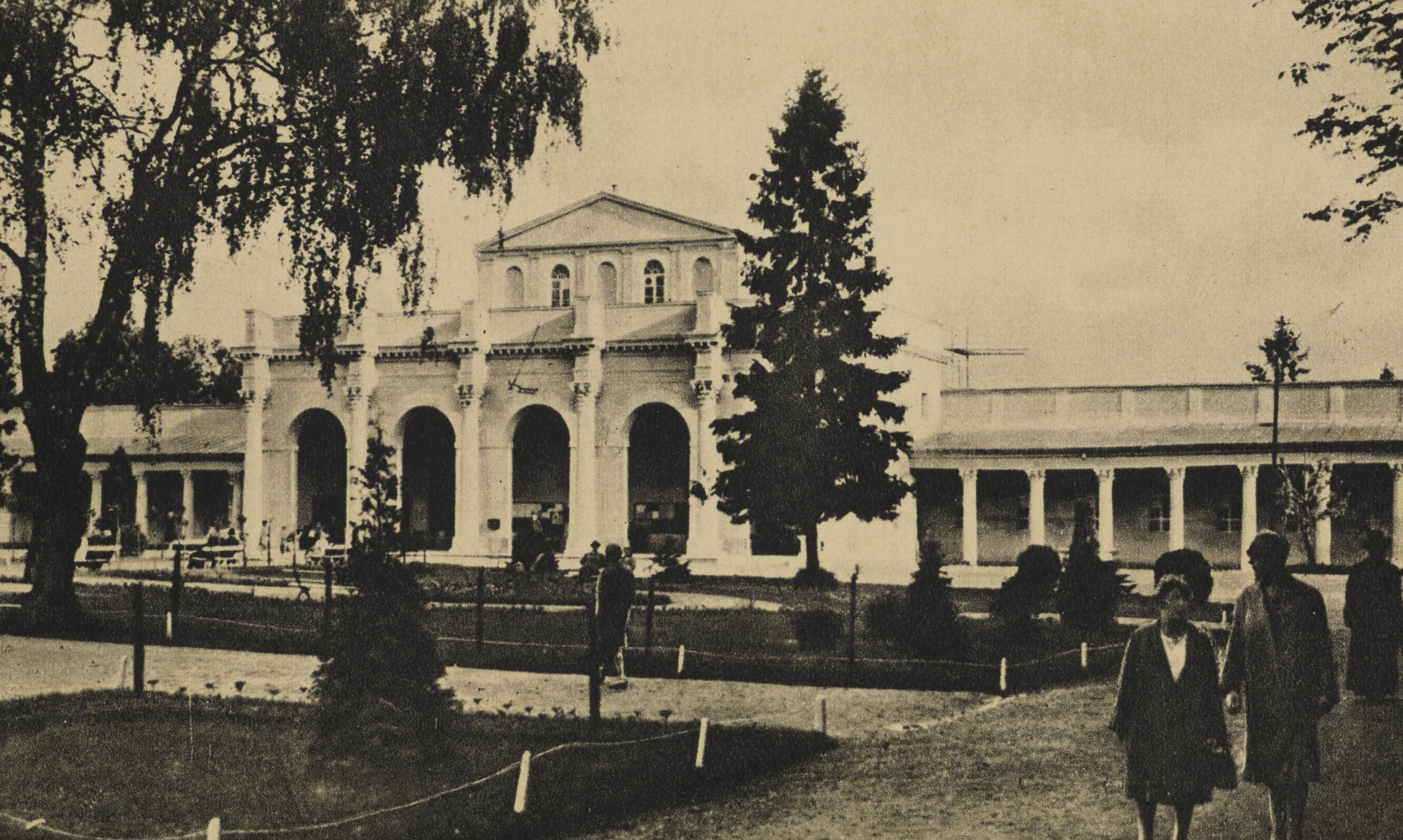
Sanatorium Marconi in 1935

The first document mentioning brines in Busko is the revenue privilege of Bolesław V the Chaste from 1252. Jan Winterfeld conducted research on using health waters to treat illness in 1808. When Feliks Rzewuski leased Busko in 1820, he built the spa Amenities, which was designed by Henryk Marconi. The opening ceremony of the health spa took place in 1836. Ferdynand Werner, Warsaw's pharmacist, published a full analysis of the water from Rotunda in 1832.

The town lost its town rights in 1869. This had a negative impact on the development of the town.

Aleksander Dobrzański, a doctor, became a new tenant in the 1880s. Since then, the health resort has become one of the most important health resorts in the country. Aleksander Michalski, an engineering geologist, drilled four new wells. Busko then had three times more water for medicinal purposes. Franciszek Gervais showed the exact characterisation of the dynamics, physical features and chemical composition of waters from the new water intake in 1897.

After the First World War, bathers began to arrive at the health resorts. Very intensive expansion of the health resort occurred in the interwar years, which was started by Dr. Szymon Starkiewicz, who founded a children's sanatorium under the name 'Górka'. Busko won first place at the competition for the prettiest health resort in Poland, in 1966. 'Włókniarz' - the biggest sanatorium was handed over in 1972. On 30 December 2008, there was the opening of Uzdrowiskowy Zakład Górniczy "Las Winiarski". It gives Busko's sanatorium the waters of sulphide from a new borehole, located in the town of Las Winiarski.

=== Current status ===
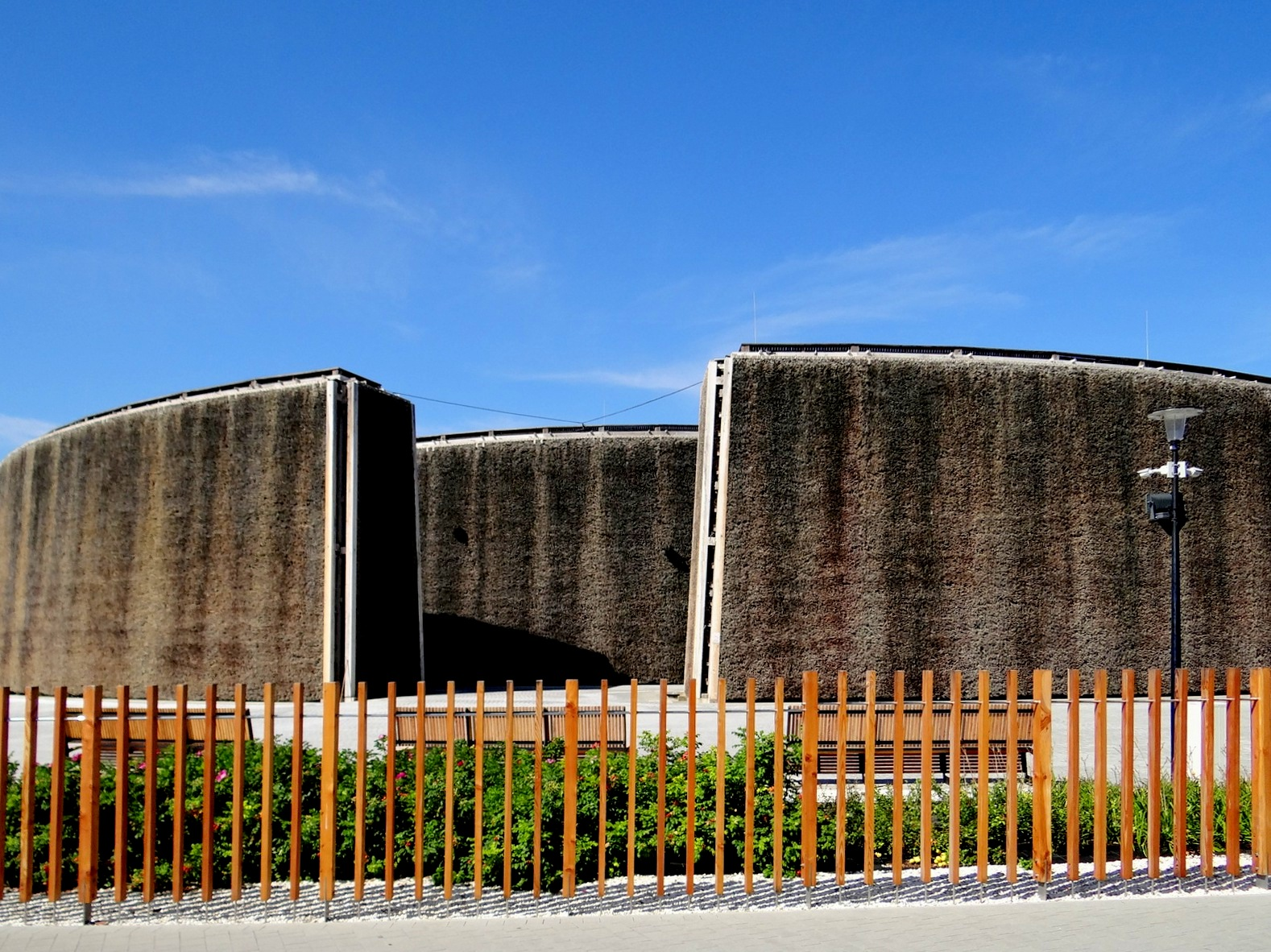
Graduation tower

In Busko, there have been 13 sanatoriums, offering a total of 2066 rooms. The yearly number of treatments approximates half a million. Treatments available in Busko-Zdrój include those for cardiovascular disease, rheumatic diseases, orthopedic conditions, neurological conditions, dermatological disorders and children's cerebral palsy. The health resort is located in the southern part of the city, near the spa's park.

In 2013 there was also opened Słoneczny Zdrój Hotel Medical Spa & Wellness.

=== Guest houses ===
Sanato – built in 1929 by the marriage of Irena and Dr. Eugeniusz Budzyński, a doctor of spa in Busko. This hotel was the most modern building among spa buildings in the town. The building was requisitioned by UB in 1950; until the end of 1990 it was used as sanatorium UB-MSW . The heir of the building requested reimbursement in 1990. On 17 November 1996, it was restored and the recovered guest house had its first guests.

Dersław's Castle – a guest house with a restaurant on the main street of the city - ul. Mickiewicza.

Since 1960 it has produced mineral water under the name 'Buskowianka' .

== Spa Park ==
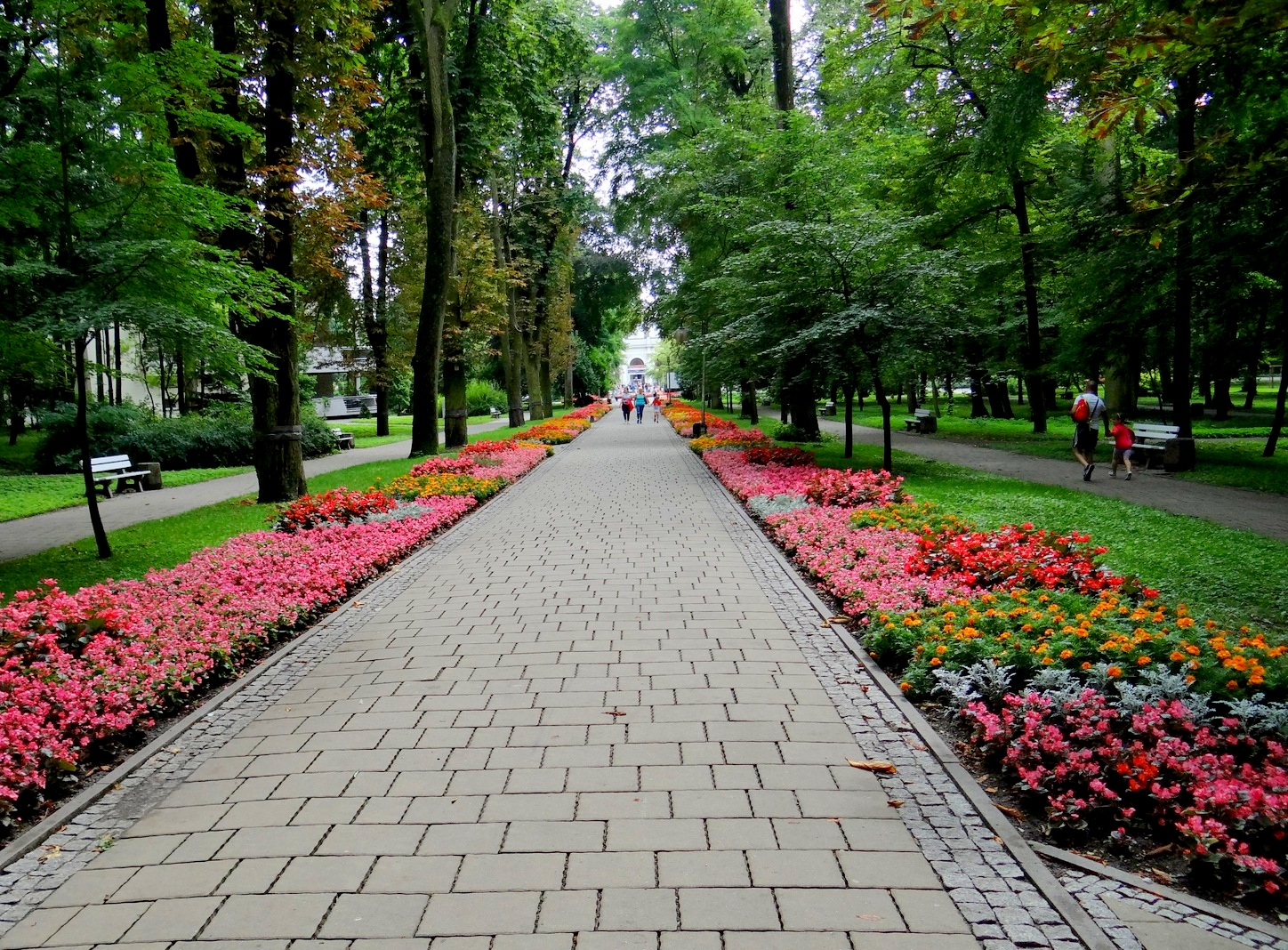
Spa Park

Spa Park was established in the 19th century by gardener Ignacy Hanusz. The park was designed by Henryk Marconi. It is divided into three parts:

- The fenced amenities garden, with Marconi Sanatorium and a fountain in the center.
- Mickiewicz's alley, a promenade with two rows of trees (mainly chestnut trees).
- Victory Square (Plac Zwycięstwa), which has a fountain and is located in the center of Busko-Zdrój.

Mickiewicz's alley connects the amenities garden with the market. It is a representative alley of Busko-Zdrój, where one can find the City Office, Starostwo Powiatowe, Police, Green Gallery, three secondary schools, and one primary school.

The bandshell is located near the 'Marconi' sanatorium. The alley in front of the front door of the sanatorium is called Star's promenade (just like the Hollywood Walk of Fame). On this promenade we can find 'suns', which belong to the people who are associated with festival and classical music, such as: Krystyna Jamroz, Krzysztof Penderecki, Wiesław Ochman (2008), Bogusław Kaczyński (2008) and Gwendolyn Bradley (2014).

Among the large number of trees (4500 species), almost 12% are over 100 years old. The most popular species in the park are clone, ash, sycamore maple, common hornbeam, Robinia pseudoacacia, linden, chestnut, elm. We can also find birch, European larch, bird cherry, Gymnocladus canadensis, London plane, yellow chestnut, and Catalpa bignonioides.

== Health resort ==
- Zespół Opieki Zdrowotnej in Busko-Zdrój, ZOZ- Hospital District
- Independent Public Primary Healthcare Team, SPZPOZ in Busko-Zdrój
- Center of Medical Rescue and Sanitary Transportation in Kielce
- Ambulance Service in Busko-Zdrój
- Hospice under the name Blessed Mother Teresa in Busko-Zdrój

== Education ==
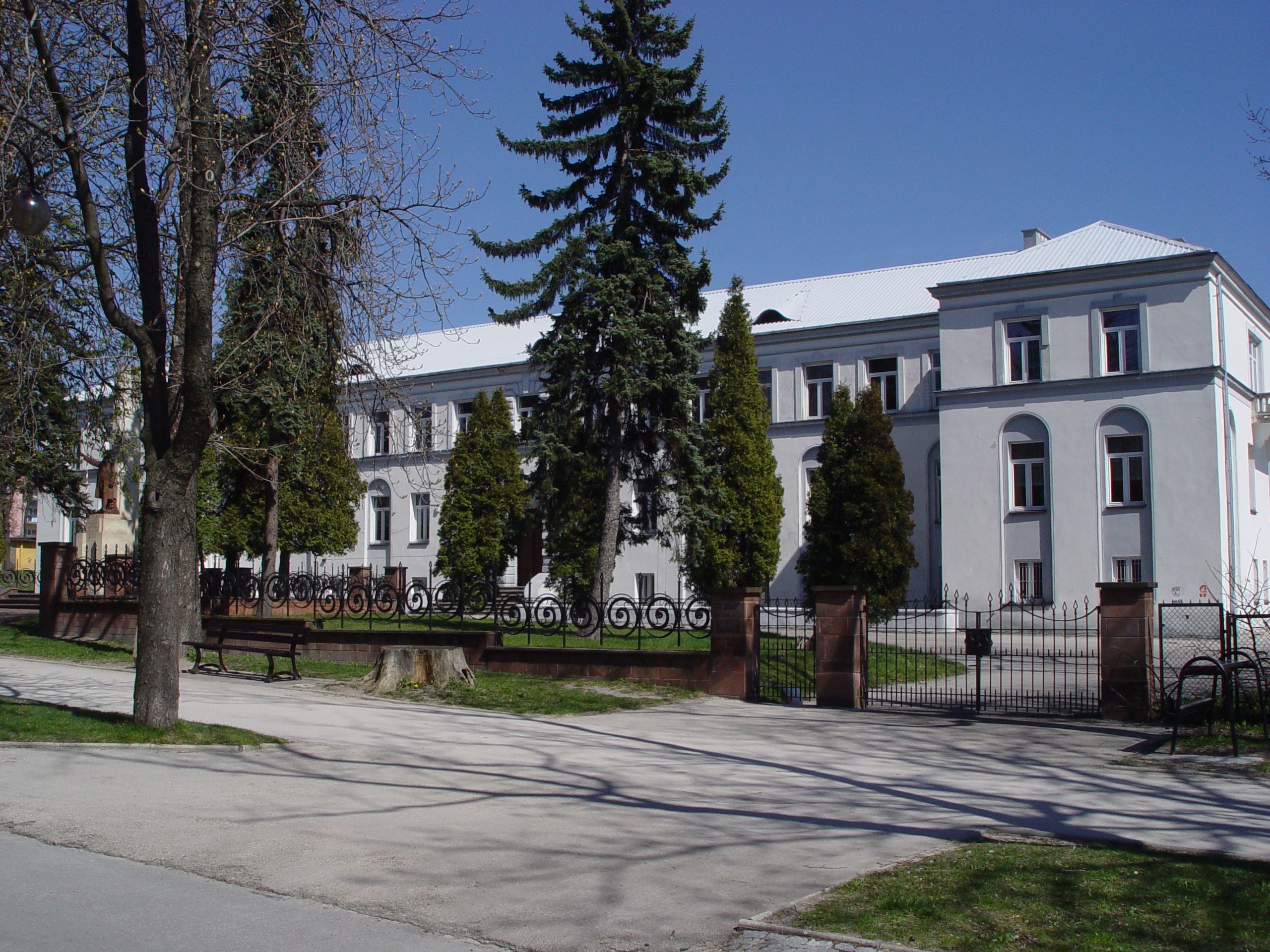
Tadeusz Kościuszko General education liceum No. 1

Primary schools:

- Primary School nr 1 under the name Stanisław Staszic
- Primary School nr 2 under the name Janusz Korczak (till 25.06.2009, school was under the name Hanka Sawicka )
- Primary School nr 3 under the name Aleksander Krzyżanowski 'Wilk'

Secondary schools

- Tadeusz Kościuszko General education liceum No. 1, Mickiewicza 13 street
- Complex Technical School and Secondary under the name Kazimierz Wielki
- Zespół Szkół Ponadpodstawowych nr 1, named Mikołaj Kopernik
- Vocational Training Centre ZDZ

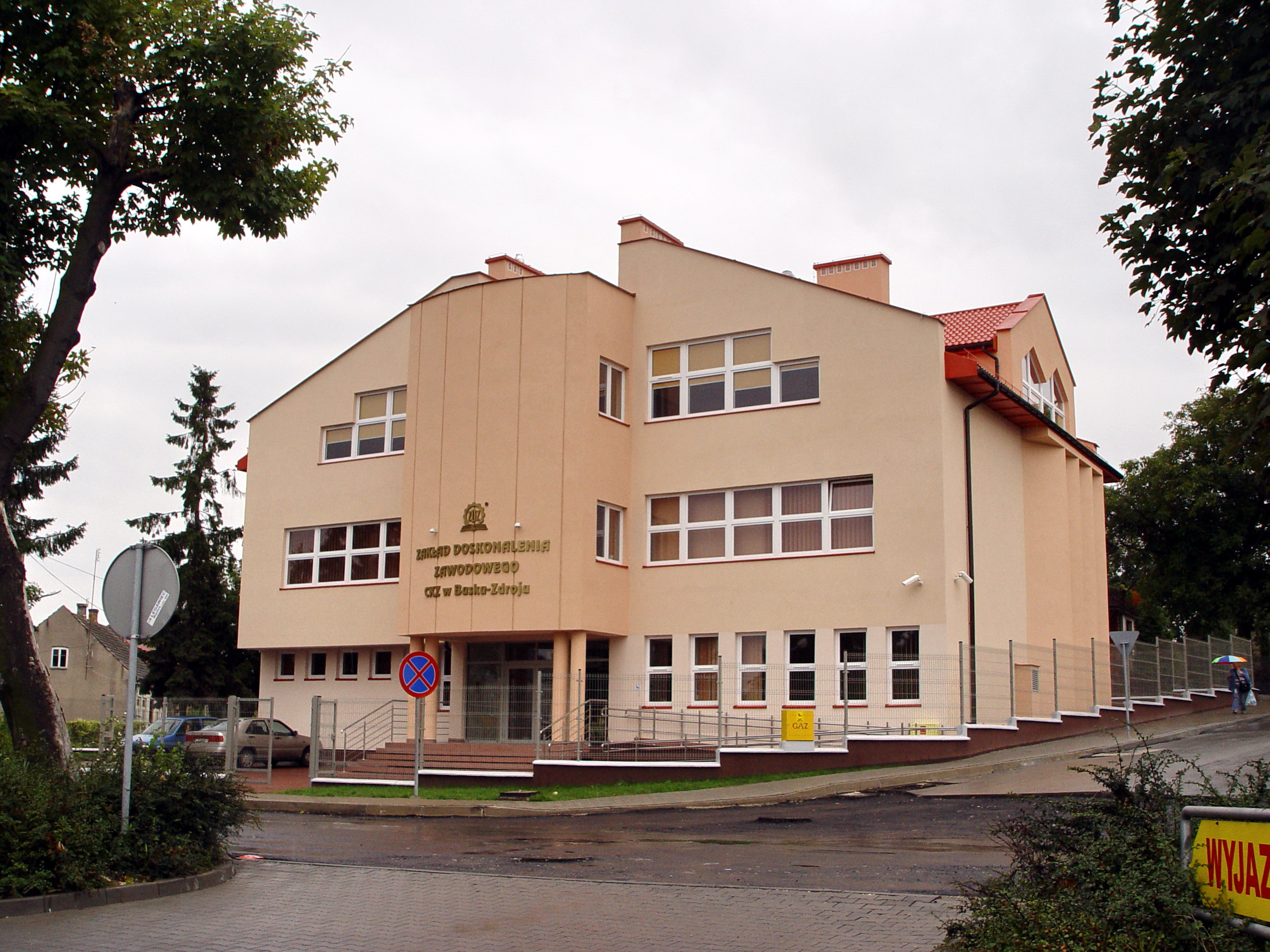
Vocational Training Centre

=== Special education ===
- Specjalny Ośrodek Szkolno Wychowawczy dla Niepełnosprawnych Ruchowo
- GÓRKA Special Primary School

== Culture ==
Three teams of young people thrive in the House of Culture, and attend to a number of activities: vocal music groups, the Brass Band, Instrumental Quartet, Recitation Group, Photo Club, Children's Club, and a club of amateur artists. This building also houses the Zdrój cinema.

The Zielona gallery, established in 1990, is located near Mickiewicza street. On display in the gallery are different types of works by Polish and foreign artists, such as paintings, carvings and photography.

=== Permanent cultural events ===
- Busko's meeting with folklore (in May)
- Florian's Fair (in May)
- Nationwide review of songs name of Wojtek Belon Szukam, szukania mi trzeba (in May/June)
- International Music Festival name of Krystyna Jamroz (in June/July)
- Summer with Chopin (in July)
- Provincial review of a poem and song of Legions, a Soldiers' Song and a Guerrilla Song (in November)
- The review of Art 'Ponidzie' (in November)

== Media ==
Local radio in Busko-Zdrój thrives under name Twoje Radio Busko on the 1584 kHz AM frequency (medium wave). Moreover, internet radio 'Radio Ponidzie' cooperates with Busko. Busko also has a local newspaper called Tygodnik Ponidzia, which prints information about Busko and adjacent counties.

== Sport and recreation ==
The First Class Football Club MKS Zdrój, which has a stadium with over 1,143 seats, is used for athletic and football field events. Nearby is a sports hall, which organizes international sports competitions in team handball, volleyball, and basketball, for an audience of 500 people.

Each spring in Busko-Zdrój, there is an organized cycling competition named Andrzej Imosa. The residents of Busko can use a number of other sports fields located by education institutions. The tennis court is located by Spa's park, Włókniarz sanatorium and ZSTiO. In the winter the children toboggan from a small hill in Mickiewicza street, called "Byczok" by the residents.

In the city there are four indoor swimming pools:

- A municipal pool named Stefan Komenda in the center of the town, opened in 2001, with a 65-metre-high water slide.
- Two swimming pools in the sanatoriums Włókniarz and Krystyna.
- A swimming pool in the Górka Hospital.

Until recently, Busko had an outdoor swimming pool in the spa's park.

Two kilometres south from Busko is a lake, located in Radzanów village; its area is 23 hectares. In summer time there is bathing. The area of the bath is 11 hectare. Near to the lake, only 3 km (2 mi) is a private hippotherapy center in Wolica.

== Outdoor recreation ==
There are 3 hiking trails:

- red - from Busko to Solec-Zdrój (27 km (17 mi))
- green - from Busko to Wiślica (90 km (56 mi))
- blue - from Pińczów to Wiślica (39 km (24 mi))

== Name of the city ==
The name of the city when written with the hyphen is the correct form (Busko-Zdrój) and the name written without a hyphen is the colloquial form. Until recently the form "Busko Zdrój" was given in the dictionary as a correct form. A conflict grew between the official form and the dictionary form. The conflict was resolved in 2004 by the Polish Language Council, which adopted that all two articulate names should be written with a hyphen.

== People associated with Busko-Zdrój ==
- Eugeniusz Budzyński – mjr dr med., killed in Katyń, a doctor of spa in Busko-Zdrój, a founder and owner of 'Sanato' Hotel
- Adam Jarubas - Marshal of the świętokrzyski Sejm from 2006
- Liroy – Piotr Marzec, Polish rapper, an actor and a composer
- Konstanty Miodowicz – politician, member of parliament
- Krzysztof Penderecki - Polish composer and conductor, honorary citizen of Busko-Zdrój

== International relations ==
Busko-Zdrój is twinned with:

- (Finland) Haukipudas
- (Germany) Steinheim
- (Italy) Specchia
- (Hungary) Szigetszentmiklós
- (Ukraine) Khmilnyk
