= Maciejowice (disambiguation) =

Maciejowice is a town and municipality seat in Garwolin County, Masovian Voivodeship (east-central Poland).

Maciejowice may also refer to:

- Maciejowice, Lesser Poland Voivodeship (south Poland)
- Maciejowice, Świętokrzyskie Voivodeship (south-central Poland)
- Maciejowice, Grójec County in Masovian Voivodeship (east-central Poland)
- Maciejowice, Kozienice County in Masovian Voivodeship (east-central Poland)
- Maciejowice, Siedlce County in Masovian Voivodeship (east-central Poland)
- Maciejowice, Opole Voivodeship (south-west Poland)
