= Ursynów (disambiguation) =

Ursynów is a district of the city of Warsaw, Poland.

Ursynów may also refer to:

- Ursynów, Kozienice County, a village in the Masovian Voivodeship, Poland;
- Ursynów metro station in Warsaw, Poland;
- Ursynów-Centrum (also known as South Ursynów), a neighbourhood of Ursynów, in Warsaw, Poland;
- North Ursynów, a neighbourhood of Ursynów, in Warsaw, Poland;
- Old Imielin (also known as West Ursynów), a neighbourhood of Ursynów, in Warsaw, Poland;
- Gmina Warsaw-Ursynów, a former municipality in Masovian Voivodeship, Poland, from 1994 to 2002;
- Ursynów M-6, a prototype hovercraft designed between 1967 and 1971.
- Ursynów Palace, alternative name for the Krasiński Palace (Ursynów), a palace in Warsaw, Poland
