= Rzeszutki =

- Village
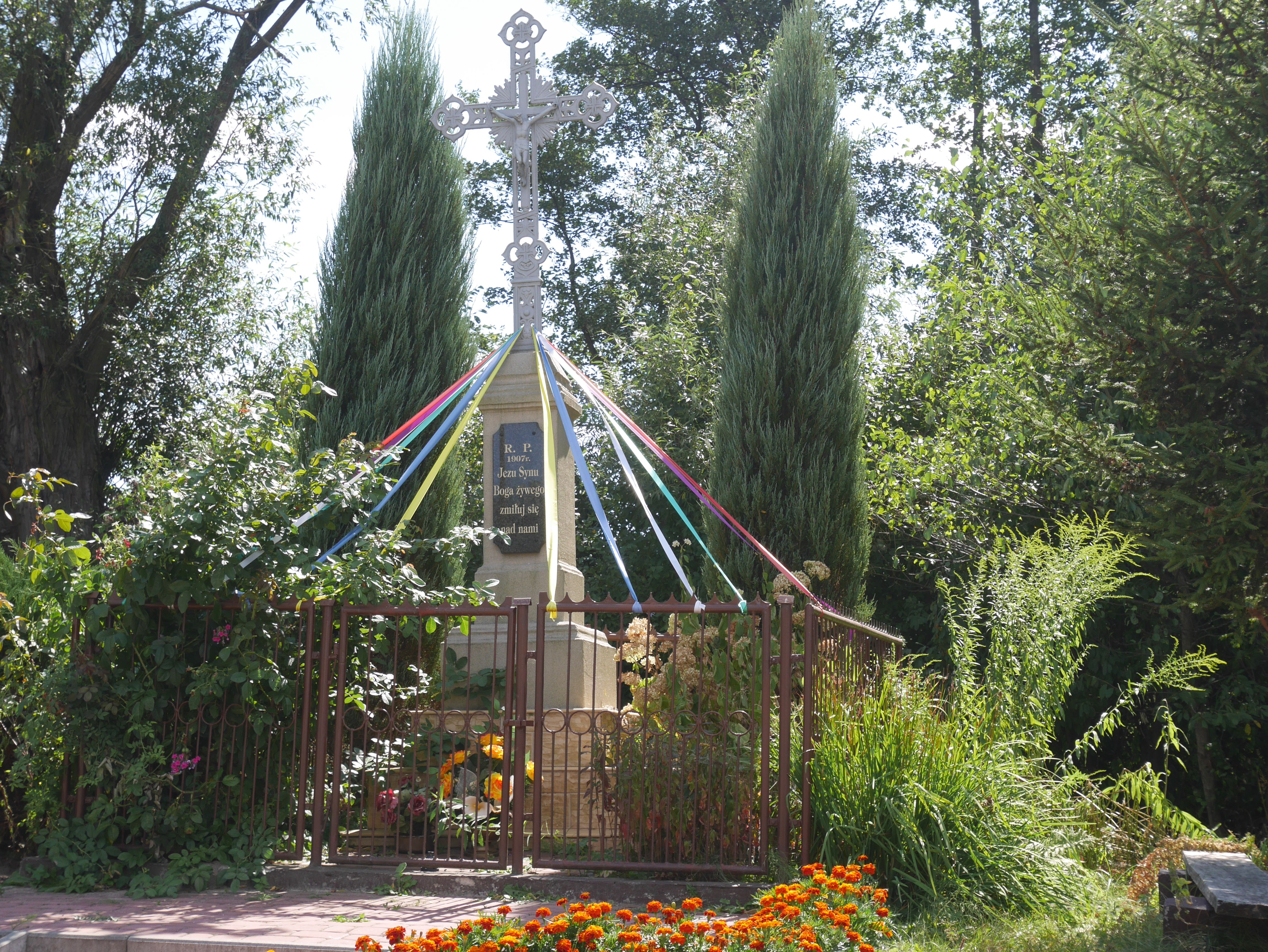

- Location within Poland
- Coordinates: 50°35′N 20°50′E
- Country: Poland
- Voivodeship: Świętokrzyskie
- County: Busko
- Gmina: Gnojno

Rzeszutki [ʐɛˈʂutki] is a village in the administrative district of Gmina Gnojno, within Busko County, Świętokrzyskie Voivodeship, in south-central Poland. It lies approximately 3 km (2 mi) south of Gnojno, 16 km (10 mi) north-east of Busko-Zdrój, and 37 km (23 mi) south-east of the regional capital Kielce.
