= Zagrody =

Zagrody may refer to the following places:

- Zagrody, Gmina Goraj in Lublin Voivodeship (east Poland)
- Zagrody, Gmina Tarnogród in Lublin Voivodeship (east Poland)
- Zagrody, Chełm County in Lublin Voivodeship (east Poland)
- Zagrody, Lublin County in Lublin Voivodeship (east Poland)
- Zagrody, Puławy County in Lublin Voivodeship (east Poland)
- Zagrody, Lesser Poland Voivodeship (south Poland)
- Zagrody, Busko County in Świętokrzyskie Voivodeship (south-central Poland)
- Zagrody, Kielce County in Świętokrzyskie Voivodeship (south-central Poland)
- Zagrody, Sandomierz County in Świętokrzyskie Voivodeship (south-central Poland)
- Zagrody, Staszów County in Świętokrzyskie Voivodeship (south-central Poland)
- Zagrody, West Pomeranian Voivodeship (north-west Poland)
