= Poręba, Świętokrzyskie Voivodeship =

Poręba
- Village
- Location within Poland
- Coordinates: 50°37′19″N 20°51′22″E
- Country: Poland
- Voivodeship: Świętokrzyskie
- County: Busko
- Gmina: Gnojno

Poręba [pɔˈrɛmba] is a village in the administrative district of Gmina Gnojno, within Busko County, Świętokrzyskie Voivodeship, in south-central Poland. It lies approximately 3 km (2 mi) north of Gnojno, 20 km (12 mi) north-east of Busko-Zdrój, and 34 km (21 mi) south-east of the regional capital Kielce.
