= Zawada, Busko County =

Zawada
- Village
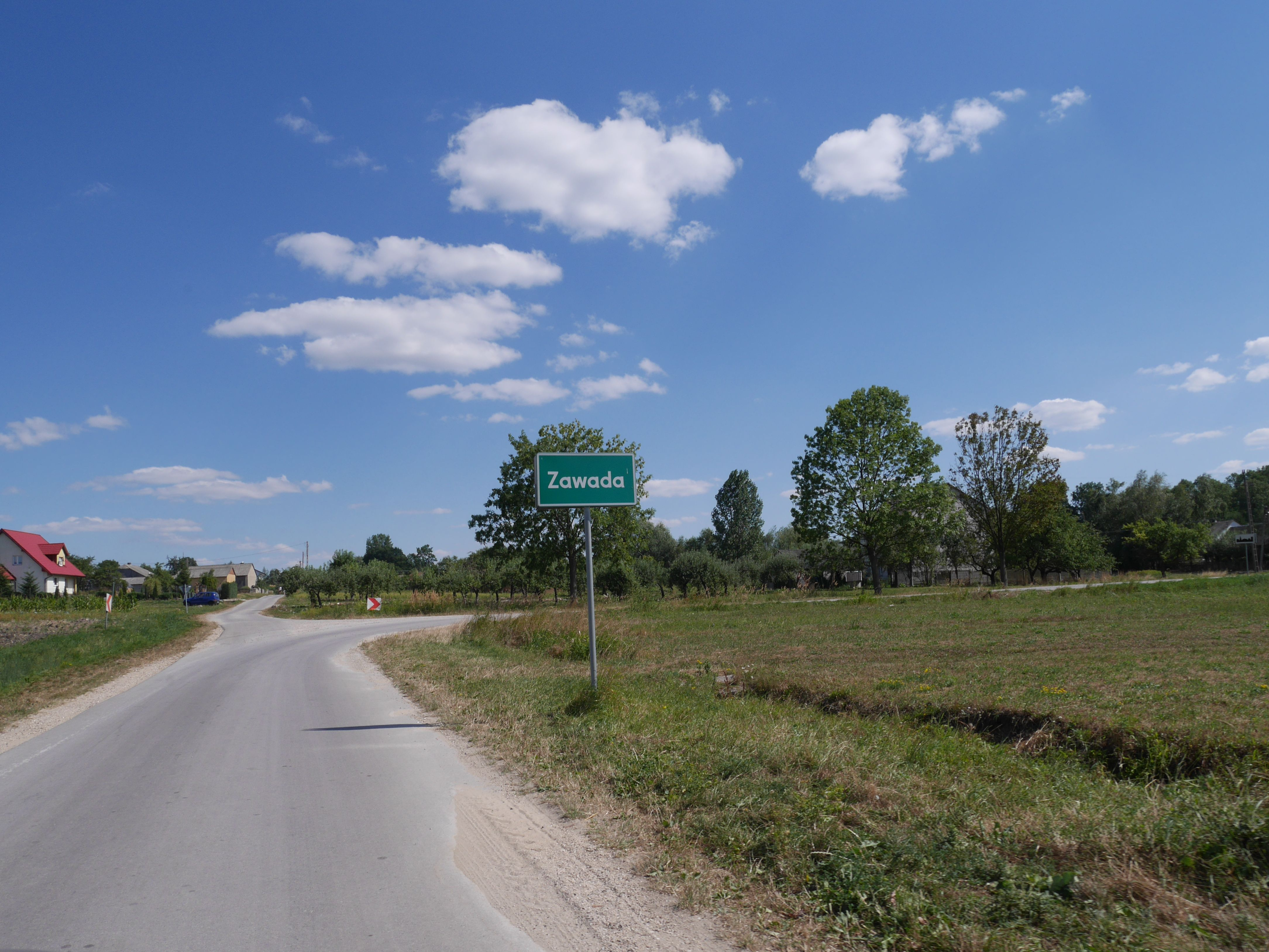

- Location within Poland
- Coordinates: 50°33′41″N 20°48′48″E
- Country: Poland
- Voivodeship: Świętokrzyskie
- County: Busko
- Gmina: Gnojno

Zawada [zaˈvada] is a village in the administrative district of Gmina Gnojno, within Busko County, Świętokrzyskie Voivodeship, in south-central Poland. It lies approximately 6 km (4 mi) south-west of Gnojno, 13 km (8 mi) north-east of Busko-Zdrój, and 39 km (24 mi) south of the regional capital Kielce.
