= Skadla =

- Village
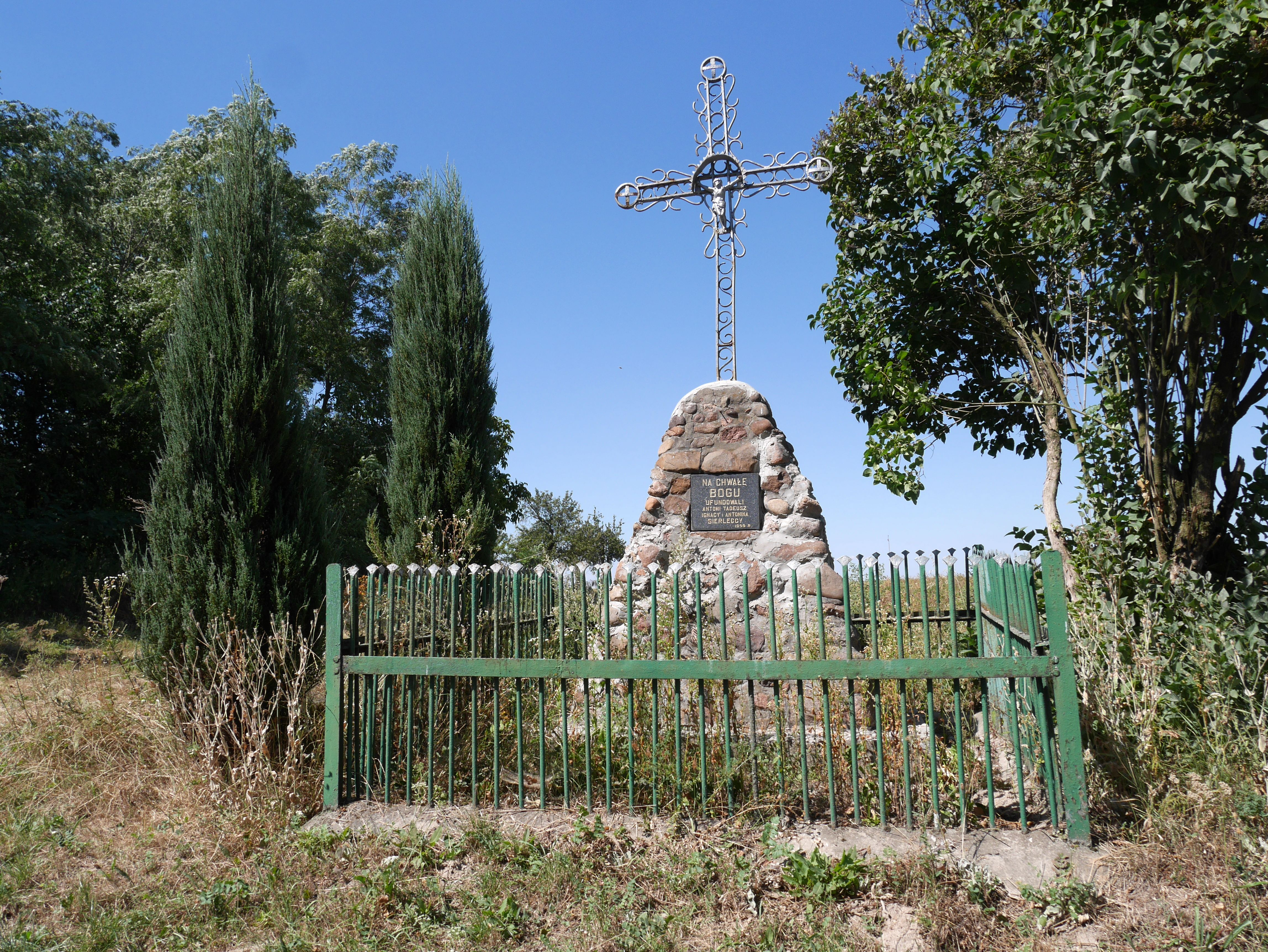

- Location within Poland
- Coordinates: 50°36′N 20°54′E
- Country: Poland
- Voivodeship: Świętokrzyskie
- County: Busko
- Gmina: Gnojno

Skadla [ˈskadla] is a village in the administrative district of Gmina Gnojno, within Busko County, Świętokrzyskie Voivodeship, in south-central Poland. It lies approximately 4 km (2 mi) east of Gnojno, 20 km (12 mi) north-east of Busko-Zdrój, and 38 km (24 mi) south-east of the regional capital Kielce. As of 2015, Skadla had a population of 168 residents. The village covers an area of 0.506 square kilometers.
