= Podmieście =

Podmieście may refer to the following places in Poland:

- Podmieście, Lower Silesian Voivodeship (south-west Poland)
- Podmieście, Gmina Głowaczów in Masovian Voivodeship (east-central Poland)
