= Grabki Małe =

- Village
- Location within Poland
- Coordinates: 50°35′7″N 20°56′24″E
- Country: Poland
- Voivodeship: Świętokrzyskie
- County: Busko
- Gmina: Gnojno

Grabki Małe [ˈɡrapki ˈmawɛ] is a village in the administrative district of Gmina Gnojno, within Busko County, Świętokrzyskie Voivodeship, in south-central Poland. It lies approximately 8 km (5 mi) east of Gnojno, 21 km (13 mi) north-east of Busko-Zdrój, and 41 km (25 mi) south-east of the regional capital Kielce.
