= Wólka Bosowska =

- Village
- Location within Poland
- Coordinates: 50°33′N 20°55′E
- Country: Poland
- Voivodeship: Świętokrzyskie
- County: Busko
- Gmina: Gnojno

Wólka Bosowska [ˈvulka bɔˈsɔfska] is a village in the administrative district of Gmina Gnojno, within Busko County, Świętokrzyskie Voivodeship, in south-central Poland. It lies approximately 8 km (5 mi) south-east of Gnojno, 17 km (11 mi) north-east of Busko-Zdrój, and 43 km (27 mi) south-east of the regional capital Kielce.
