= Glinka, Busko County =

Glinka
- Village
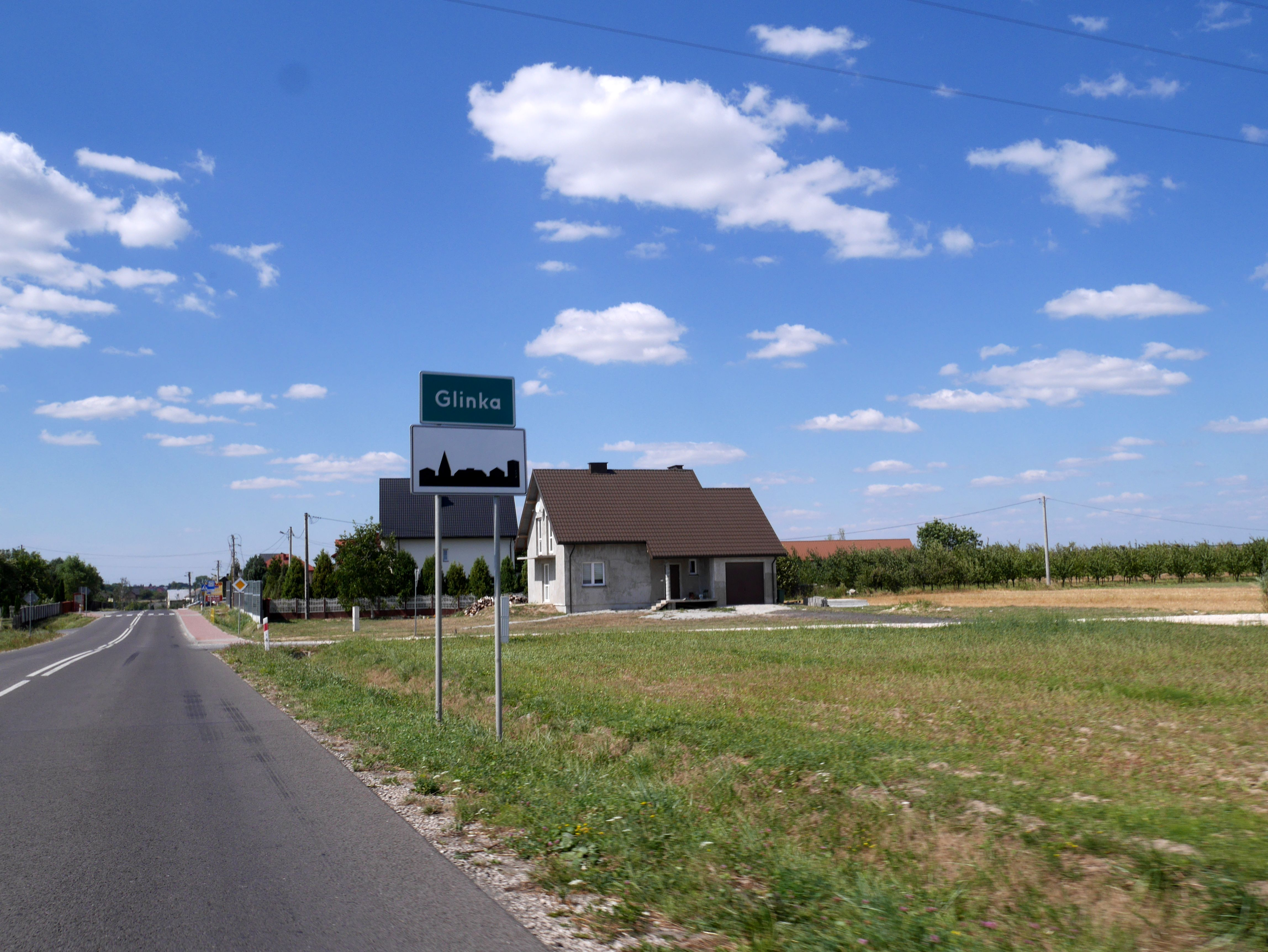

- Location within Poland
- Coordinates: 50°35′55″N 20°51′50″E
- Country: Poland
- Voivodeship: Świętokrzyskie
- County: Busko
- Gmina: Gnojno

Glinka [ˈɡlinka] is a village in the administrative district of Gmina Gnojno, within Busko County, Świętokrzyskie Voivodeship, in south-central Poland. It lies approximately 2 km (1 mi) east of Gnojno, 18 km (11 mi) north-east of Busko-Zdrój, and 37 km (23 mi) south-east of the regional capital Kielce.
