= Wola Bokrzycka =

- Village
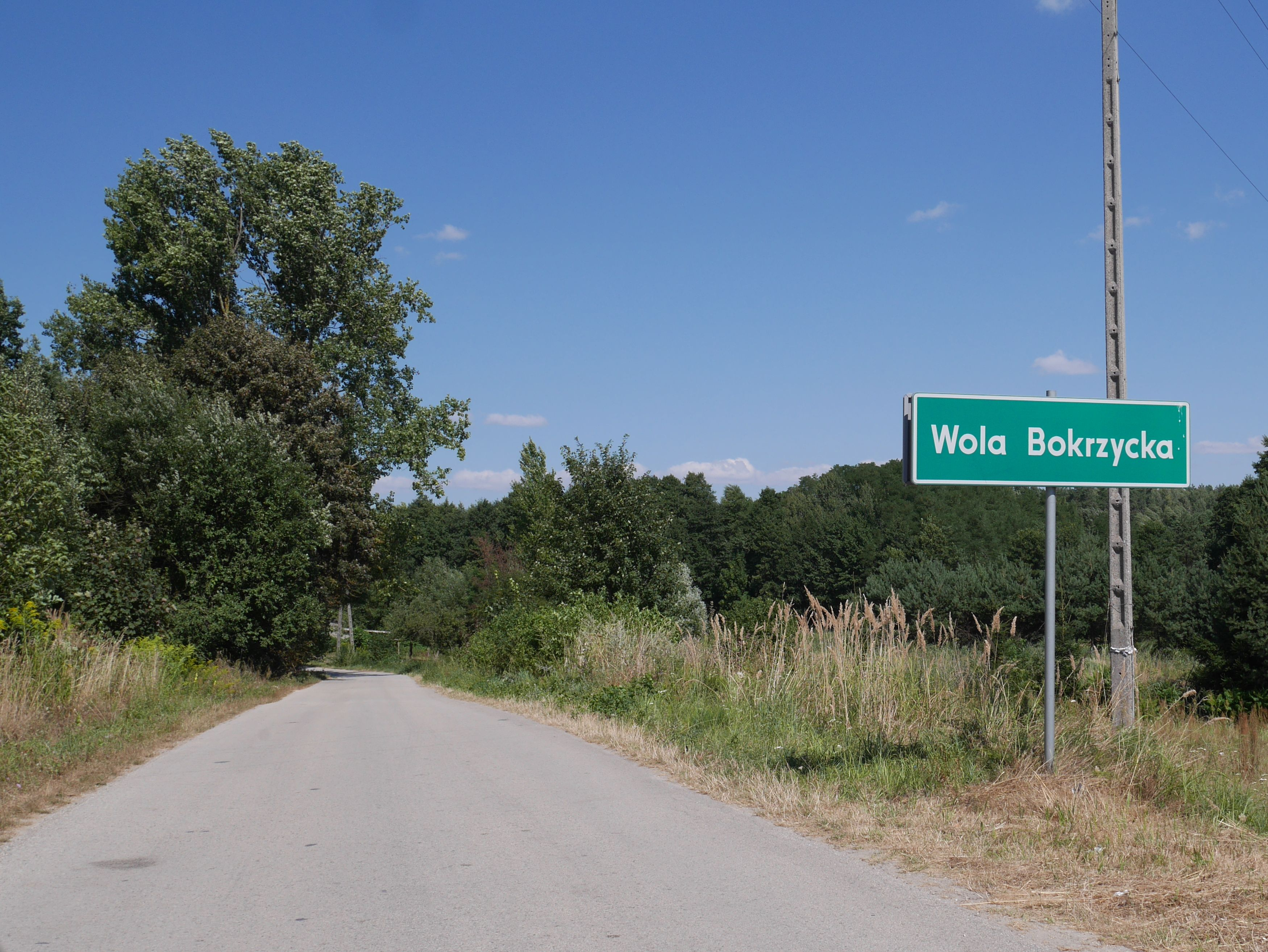

- Location within Poland
- Coordinates: 50°36′N 20°54′E
- Country: Poland
- Voivodeship: Świętokrzyskie
- County: Busko
- Gmina: Gnojno

Wola Bokrzycka [ˈvɔla bɔˈkʂɨt͡ska] is a village in the administrative district of Gmina Gnojno, within Busko County, Świętokrzyskie Voivodeship, in south-central Poland. It lies approximately 4 km (2 mi) east of Gnojno, 20 km (12 mi) north-east of Busko-Zdrój, and 38 km (24 mi) south-east of the regional capital Kielce.
