= Kostera =

- Village
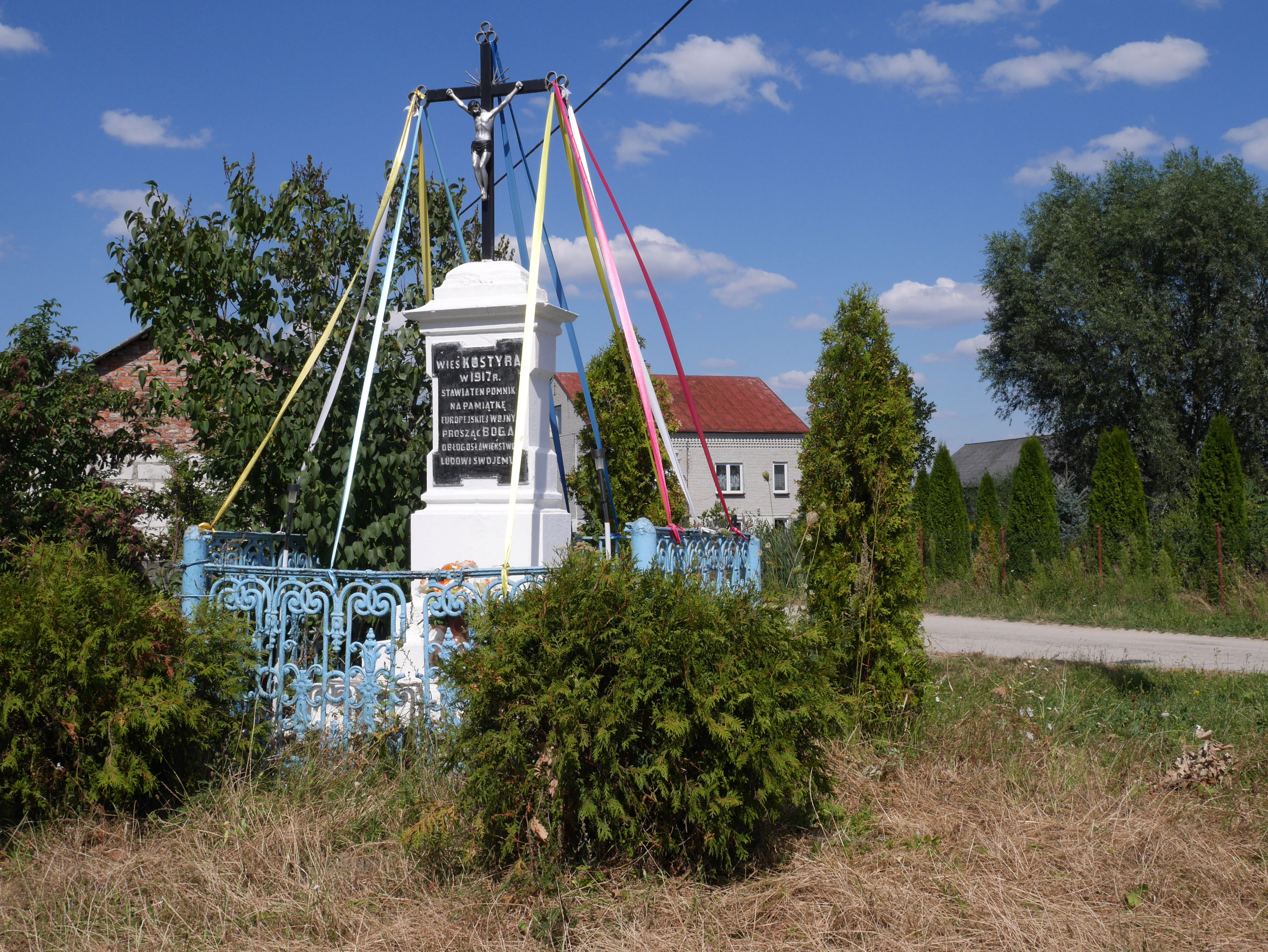

- Location within Poland
- Coordinates: 50°32′52″N 20°47′32″E
- Country: Poland
- Voivodeship: Świętokrzyskie
- County: Busko
- Gmina: Gnojno

Kostera [kɔsˈtɛra] is a village in the administrative district of Gmina Gnojno, within Busko County, Świętokrzyskie Voivodeship, in south-central Poland. It lies approximately 8 km (5 mi) south-west of Gnojno, 11 km (7 mi) north-east of Busko-Zdrój, and 40 km (25 mi) south of the regional capital Kielce.
