= Balice, Świętokrzyskie Voivodeship =

Balice
- Village
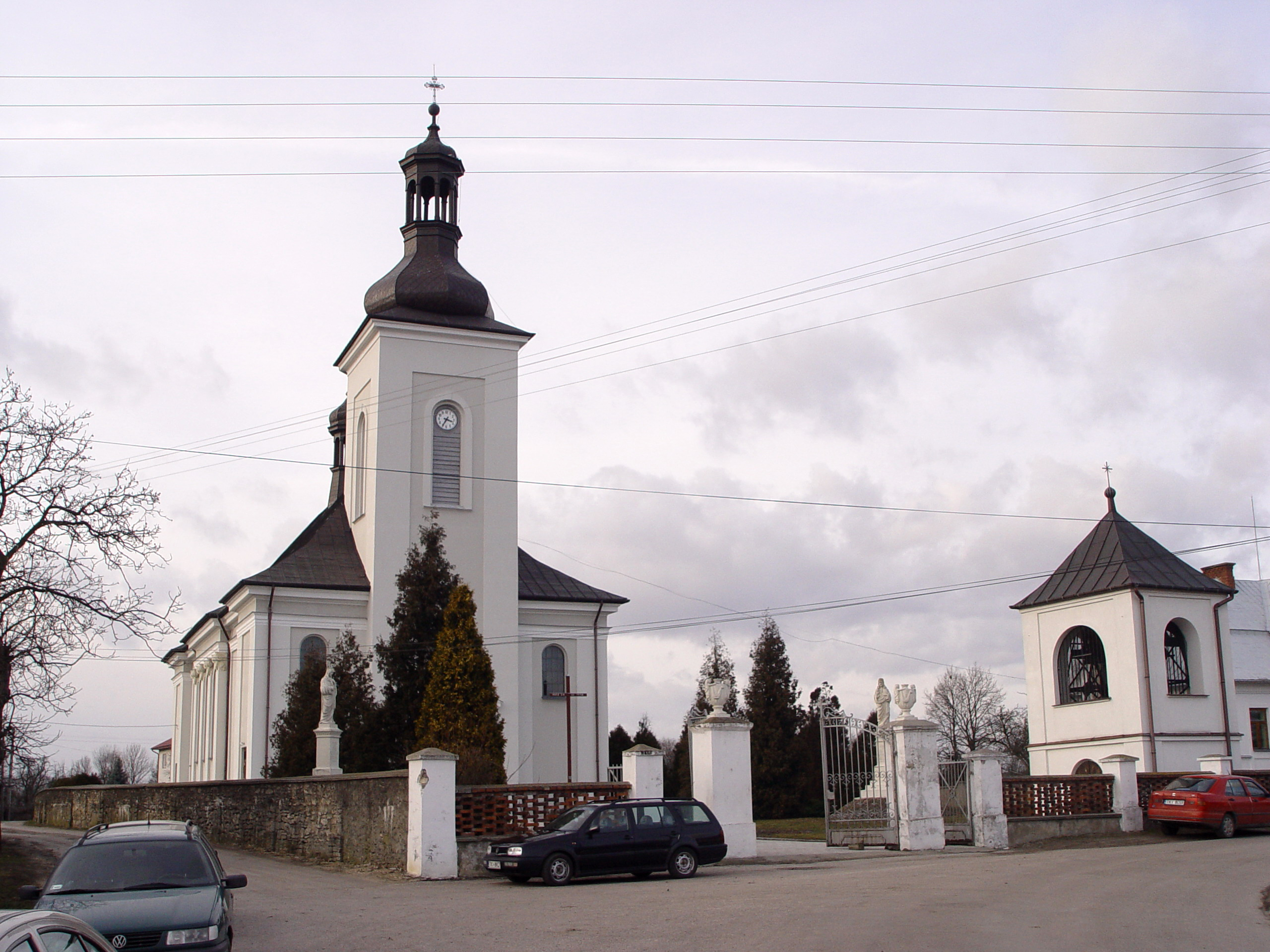
- Catholic church

- Location within Poland
- Coordinates: 50°32′41″N 20°50′4″E
- Country: Poland
- Voivodeship: Świętokrzyskie
- County: Busko
- Gmina: Gnojno
- Population: 400

Balice [baˈlit͡sɛ] is a village in the administrative district of Gmina Gnojno, within Busko County, Świętokrzyskie Voivodeship, in south-central Poland. It lies approximately 7 km (4 mi) south of Gnojno, 13 km (8 mi) north-east of Busko-Zdrój, and 41 km (25 mi) south of the regional capital Kielce.
