= Gorzakiew =

- Village
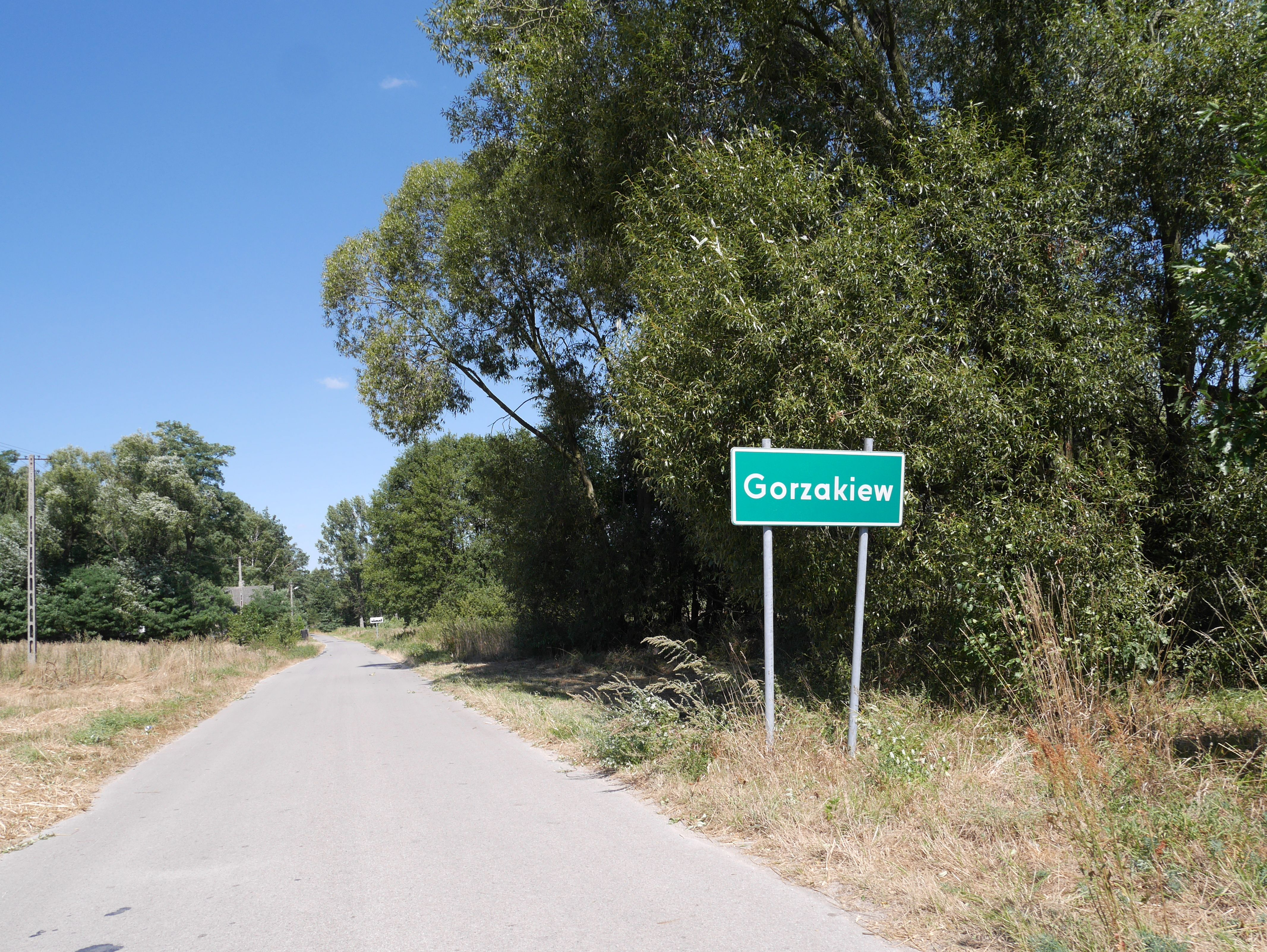

- Location within Poland
- Coordinates: 50°37′22″N 20°52′49″E
- Country: Poland
- Voivodeship: Świętokrzyskie
- County: Busko
- Gmina: Gnojno

Gorzakiew [ɡɔˈʐakʲɛf] is a village in the administrative district of Gmina Gnojno, within Busko County, Świętokrzyskie Voivodeship, in south-central Poland. It lies approximately 4 km (2 mi) north-east of Gnojno, 21 km (13 mi) north-east of Busko-Zdrój, and 35 km (22 mi) south-east of the regional capital Kielce.
