= Zofiówka, Busko County =

Zofiówka
- Village
- Location within Poland
- Coordinates: 50°36′11″N 20°55′17″E
- Country: Poland
- Voivodeship: Świętokrzyskie
- County: Busko
- Gmina: Gnojno

Zofiówka [zɔˈfjufka] is a village in the administrative district of Gmina Gnojno, within Busko County, Świętokrzyskie Voivodeship, in south-central Poland. It lies approximately 6 km (4 mi) east of Gnojno, 21 km (13 mi) north-east of Busko-Zdrój, and 38 km (24 mi) south-east of the regional capital Kielce.
