= Jarząbki, Świętokrzyskie Voivodeship =

Jarząbki
- Village
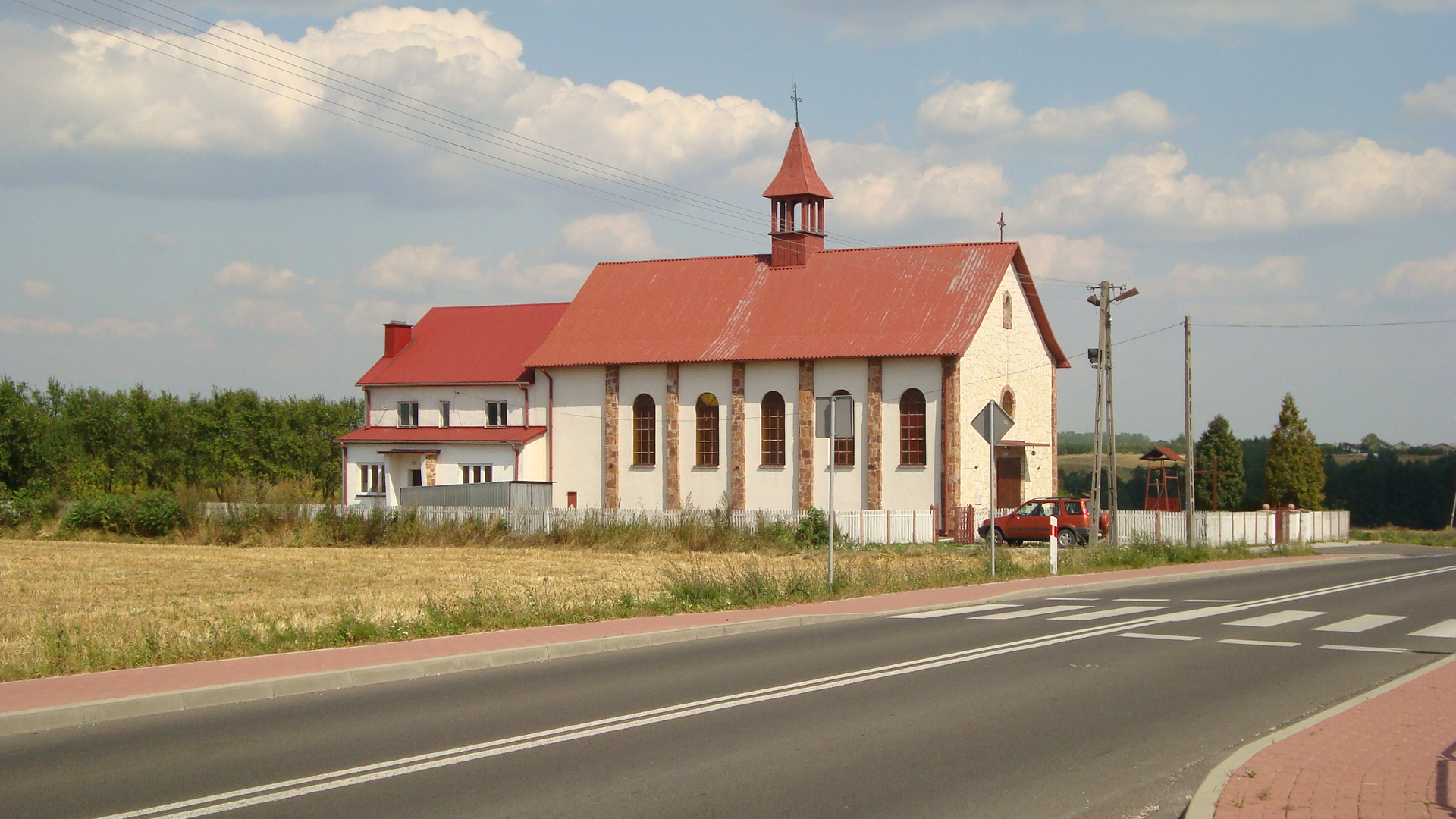
- Catholic church

- Location within Poland
- Coordinates: 50°35′13″N 20°55′30″E
- Country: Poland
- Voivodeship: Świętokrzyskie
- County: Busko
- Gmina: Gnojno

Jarząbki [jaˈʐɔmpki] is a village in the administrative district of Gmina Gnojno, within Busko County, Świętokrzyskie Voivodeship, in south-central Poland. It lies approximately 6 km (4 mi) east of Gnojno, 20 km (12 mi) north-east of Busko-Zdrój, and 40 km (25 mi) south-east of the regional capital Kielce.
