= Falki, Świętokrzyskie Voivodeship =

Falki
- Village
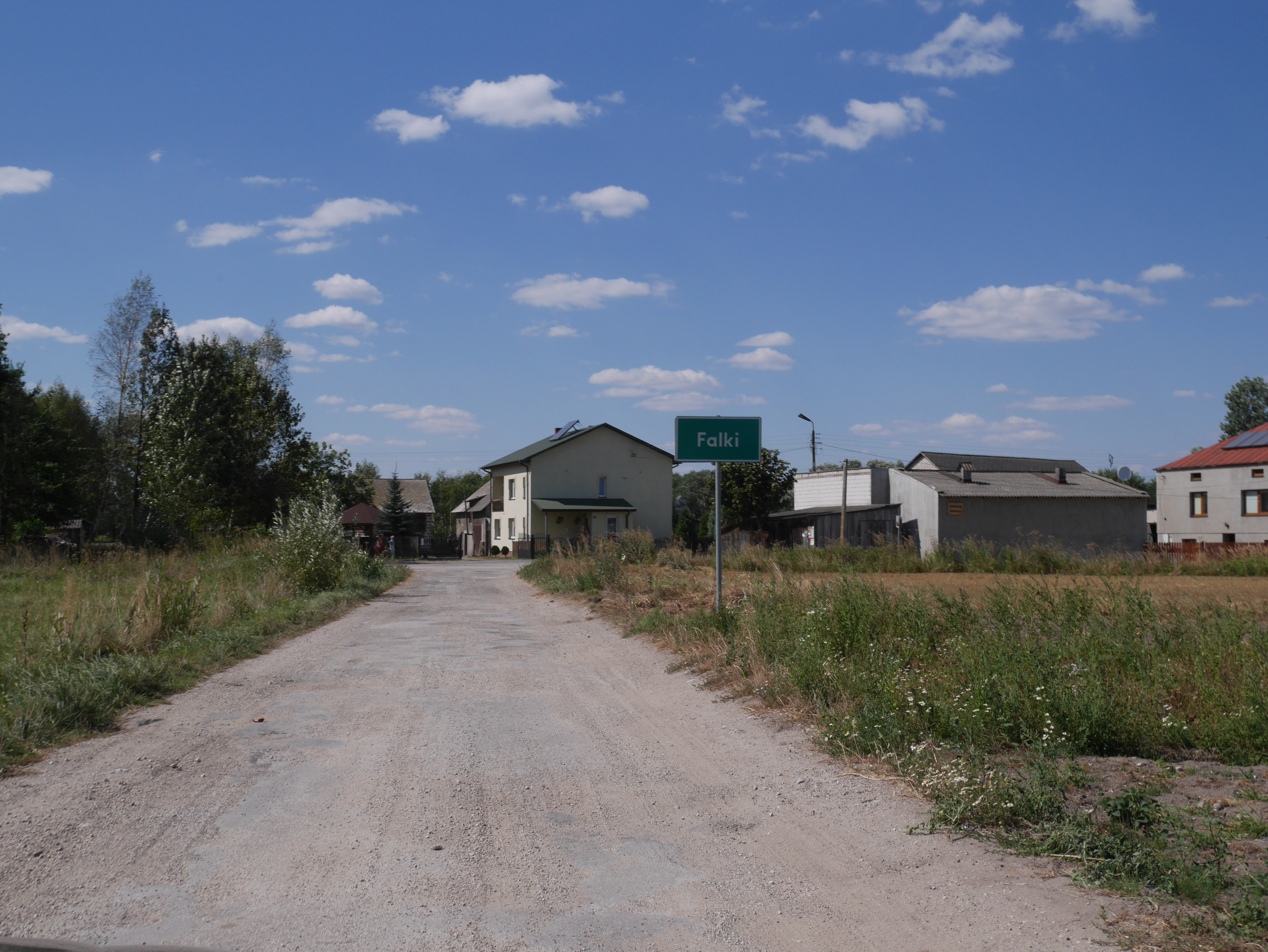

- Location within Poland
- Coordinates: 50°35′5″N 20°48′54″E
- Country: Poland
- Voivodeship: Świętokrzyskie
- County: Busko
- Gmina: Gnojno

Falki [ˈfalki] is a village in the administrative district of Gmina Gnojno, within Busko County, Świętokrzyskie Voivodeship, in south-central Poland. It lies approximately 3 km (2 mi) south-west of Gnojno, 15 km (9 mi) north-east of Busko-Zdrój, and 36 km (22 mi) south-east of the regional capital Kielce.
