= Battle of Studzianki =

1944 battle in Poland during WWII

Coordinates: 51°41′18″N 21°19′34″E

- Part of Operation Bagration of World War II
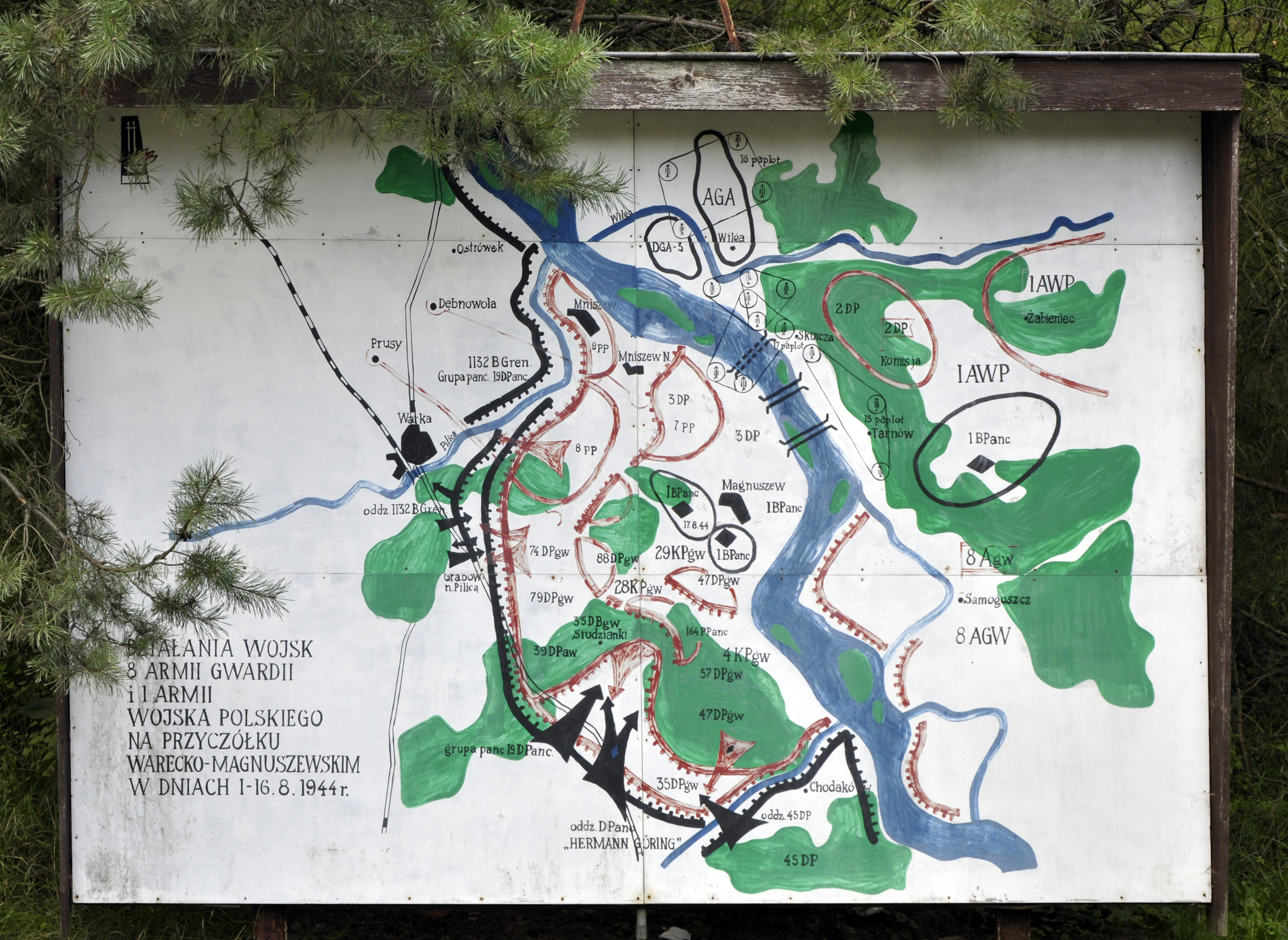
- Battle of Studzianki on the lower-left part of the map of the Magnuszew bridgehead
Date	August 9–16, 1944
Location	Studzianki, Poland
Result	Allied victory

Belligerents
Germany	Soviet Union; Poland

Commanders and leaders
Wilhelm Schmalz; Hans Källner	Ivan Kulagin; Jan Mierzycan

Strength
1st Fallschirm-Panzer Division Hermann Göring; 19th Panzer Division	Soviet 8th Guards Combined Arms Army; Polish 1st Armoured Brigade

The Battle of Studzianki was an August 1944 tank battle between elements of the Soviet 8th Guards Combined Arms Army aided by the Polish 1st Armoured Brigade in the defense of the Magnuszew bridgehead area south of Warsaw from armoured elements of the German 9th Army. The engagement was part of the Operation Bagration.

== Battle ==
The Soviet 2nd Guards Tank Army, employed as a cavalry mechanized group of the 1st Belorussian Front, was launched through the breach in the German 4th Panzer Army's front between Parczew and Chełm, and bypassing Lublin attempted to find a crossing over the Vistula. It was supported by the 1st Polish Army, including its 1st Armoured Brigade. In a hasty encounter battle, the 1st Armoured Brigade was located in the first echelon of the 2nd Tank Army. At the point where the army was able to occupy the Magnuszew bridgehead, the Polish brigade engaged advance elements of the German Fallschirm-Panzer Division 1 Hermann Göring of the Army Group North Ukraine, which had express orders to keep the Red Army from crossing the Vistula. The German attack intended to dislodge the Soviet engineers and the Polish troops providing support for them off the bridgehead.

On August 9, 1944, the Germans aided by an armoured element from the 19th Panzer Division captured the village of Grabnowola before attempting to push forward to destroy the forward elements of the Soviet 8th Guards Combined Arms Army. The Germans initially achieved some success against units of the 35th Guards Rifle Division and the 57th Guards Motor Rifle Division until an armoured counterattack by the Polish 3rd Tank Company pushed them back. On August 11, an attack by the Polish 1st Tank Company drove them from the village of Studzianki. Fierce fighting ensued as the German attack stalled with the 1st Company being forced to fight for the village more than seven times until, on the 15th, the German main force was encircled and destroyed. Remaining German forces continued to fight for another day, but retreated by August 17.

The battle was a complete failure for the Germans. Whilst their attack had initially achieved some success in the battle, pushing towards the bridgehead itself, it was then forced all the way back by the Polish armoured counterattack and was costly in terms of men and material. The Polish 1st Armoured Brigade destroyed or captured about 10 German tanks, 16 artillery guns and mortars, and 6 half-tracks, while losing 18 destroyed and 9 damaged tanks.

== Aftermath ==
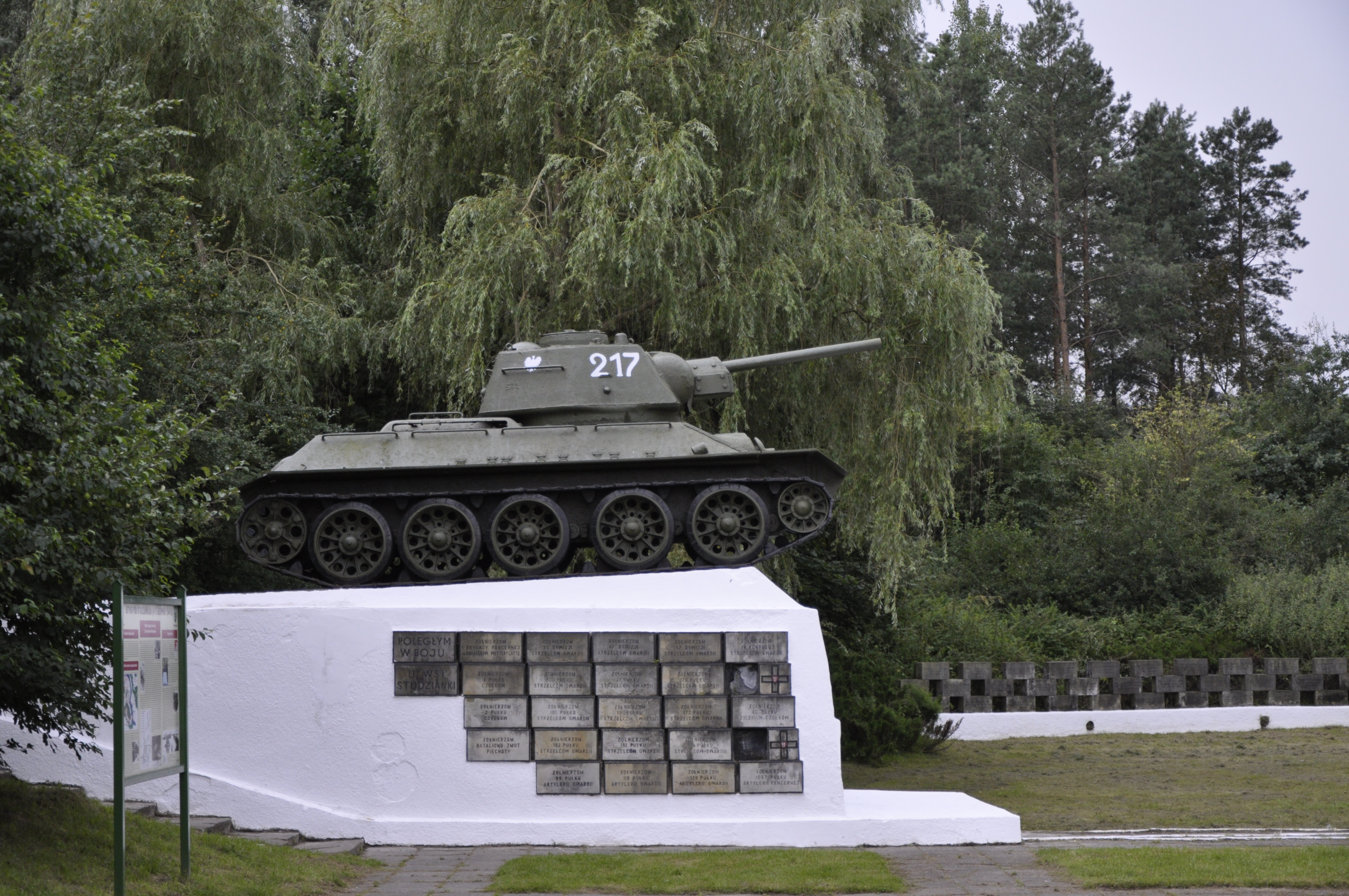
Monument in Studzianki Pancerne, with a T-34 tank that actually participated in the battle as part of the Polish 1st Armoured Brigade.

To commemorate the battle, in 1969 the name of the village Studzianki was changed to Studzianki Pancerne, the word pancerne meaning "armoured" in Polish. There is a small museum in the town focuses on the history of the battle.

The battle was depicted in the Polish novel and television series Four Tank-Men and a Dog and in a scenario in the video game World of Tanks.
