= Battle of Oździutycze =

1944 Polish-Ukrainian clash

- Part of the Massacres of the Poles in the Volhynia and Galicia during the Polish–Ukrainian ethnic conflict in the World War II
Date	29 February 1944
Location	Oździutycze, Włodzimierz County, Wołyń Voivodeship
Result	Ukrainian victory

Belligerents
Home Army	Ukrainian Insurgent Army (Ukraine) Kusch Units of the Ukrainian Self–Defense

Commanders and leaders
Stanisław Piaszczyński	Hryhoriy Kovalchuk

Units involved
27th Volhynian Infantry Division: Battalion “Łuna”; Battalion “Trzask”; Battalion “Grzyms”	Western Operational Group: 3rd Operational Group “Lysonia”; 16th Tactical District “Seret”; Company “Siromantsi”

Strength
Unknown	Unknown

Casualties and losses
7–20 killed 20 wounded 2 captured	Unknown

The Battle of Oździutycze (Polish: Bitwa pod Oździutyczami, Ukrainian: Бій під Озютичамі; 29 February 1944) was fought between the “Łuna”, “Trzask” and “Grzyms” battalions in the Polish 27th Volhynian Infantry Division of the Home Army under the command of Stanisław Piaszczyński, against the “Siromantsi” company of the 16th tactical district “Seret” in the 3rd Operational Group “Lysonia” of the Ukrainian Insurgent Army and Kusch Units of the Ukrainian Self–Defense under the command of Hryhoriy Kovalchuk in the Włodzimierz County of the Wołyń Voivodeship.

== Background ==
In the area between Włodzimierz Wołyński and Łuck, the Ukrainian Insurgent Army created a system of fortresses to support the units operating in the central and western parts of Volhynia. One such fortress was the village of Oździutycze, threatening the "Gromada" grouping. Reports about the concentration of Ukrainian Insurgent Army units in this area prompted Major Stanislaw Piaszczyński "Pogrom" to decide to attack. Three battalions were appointed to carry out the operation: 1st Battalion of 45 pp "Gzymsa", 1st Battalion of 24 pp "Łuna" and 3rd Battalion of 50 pp "Trzaska", under the command of Major "Pogrom". The plan was to strike from the north-west and north.

== Battle ==
On 28 February 1944, in the evening, I/45th pp "Gzymsa" set off from Rzewuszki along the right bank of the Turia River towards Oździutycze, and I/24th pp "Łuna" from Wolczak. The combined forces met in a forest in front of Leżów. On 29 February in the morning the column was fired upon by an UPA patrol, which withdrew to Oździutycze, warning the village crew. On the same day the III/50th pp "Trzaska" moved from Czerniów, reaching the Klementynów area. The battalions of "Gromada" and "Łuna" developed for the attack had to cross a kilometre-long snowy plain. The village was heavily fortified with a brick mill and an Orthodox church, sheltered by entanglements and shooting ditches.

The Polish troops met intense fire from the church tower, the mill and mortars, suffering heavy losses. On the left wing, an attempt was made to break through the entanglements, but without adequate fire support the troops had to retreat. The "Łuna" platoon occupied the windmill, but intense enemy fire forced them to retreat under cover of smoke. At this time, German aircraft appeared over the battlefield and shelled the Polish units visible in the snow. Forced to retreat, the Polish units withdrew towards the woods where the enemy took up pursuit, halted by the 'Gzyms' battalion.

The "Trzaska" battalion, delayed in its attack due to lack of communication with Major "Pogrom", failed to support the "Łuna" battalion, which could not break through the enemy's defences. The "Trzaska" unit also suffered losses under heavy fire and withdrew under cover of smoke to the forest, from where it conducted an effective fire.

According to the Polish historian Grzegorz Motyka, the Polish armed units lost approximately 20 men killed, 20 men wounded and 2 men were captured, who were questioned and they told what tasks of the Home Army were about. A different opinion is shared by another Polish historians Władysław and Ewa Siemaszko, they writes about 7 men killed.

== Aftermath ==
The Polish armed units retreated and the military base was successfully defended by the Ukrainian Insurgent Army. After the battle, the dead bodies of the fallen Polish soldiers in the combat were taken and buried in the village of Zasmyki. However, as the time passed, this Ukrainian base and center was destroyed in 23 March by the Soviet partisans under the command of Gregoriy Kovalyev.
