= Raczyce =

Raczyce may refer to the following places in Poland:

- Raczyce, Jawor County in Lower Silesian Voivodeship (south-west Poland)
- Raczyce, Ząbkowice County in Lower Silesian Voivodeship (south-west Poland)
- Raczyce, Świętokrzyskie Voivodeship (south-central Poland)
- Raczyce, Greater Poland Voivodeship (west-central Poland)
