= Janowice Raczyckie =

- Village
- Location within Poland
- Coordinates: 50°34′36″N 20°49′37″E
- Country: Poland
- Voivodeship: Świętokrzyskie
- County: Busko
- Gmina: Gnojno

Janowice Raczyckie [janɔˈvit͡sɛ raˈt͡ʂɨt͡skʲɛ] is a village in the administrative district of Gmina Gnojno, within Busko County, Świętokrzyskie Voivodeship, in south-central Poland. It lies approximately 4 km (2 mi) south-west of Gnojno, 15 km (9 mi) north-east of Busko-Zdrój, and 38 km (24 mi) south-east of the regional capital Kielce.
