= Bugaj, Busko County =

Bugaj
- Village
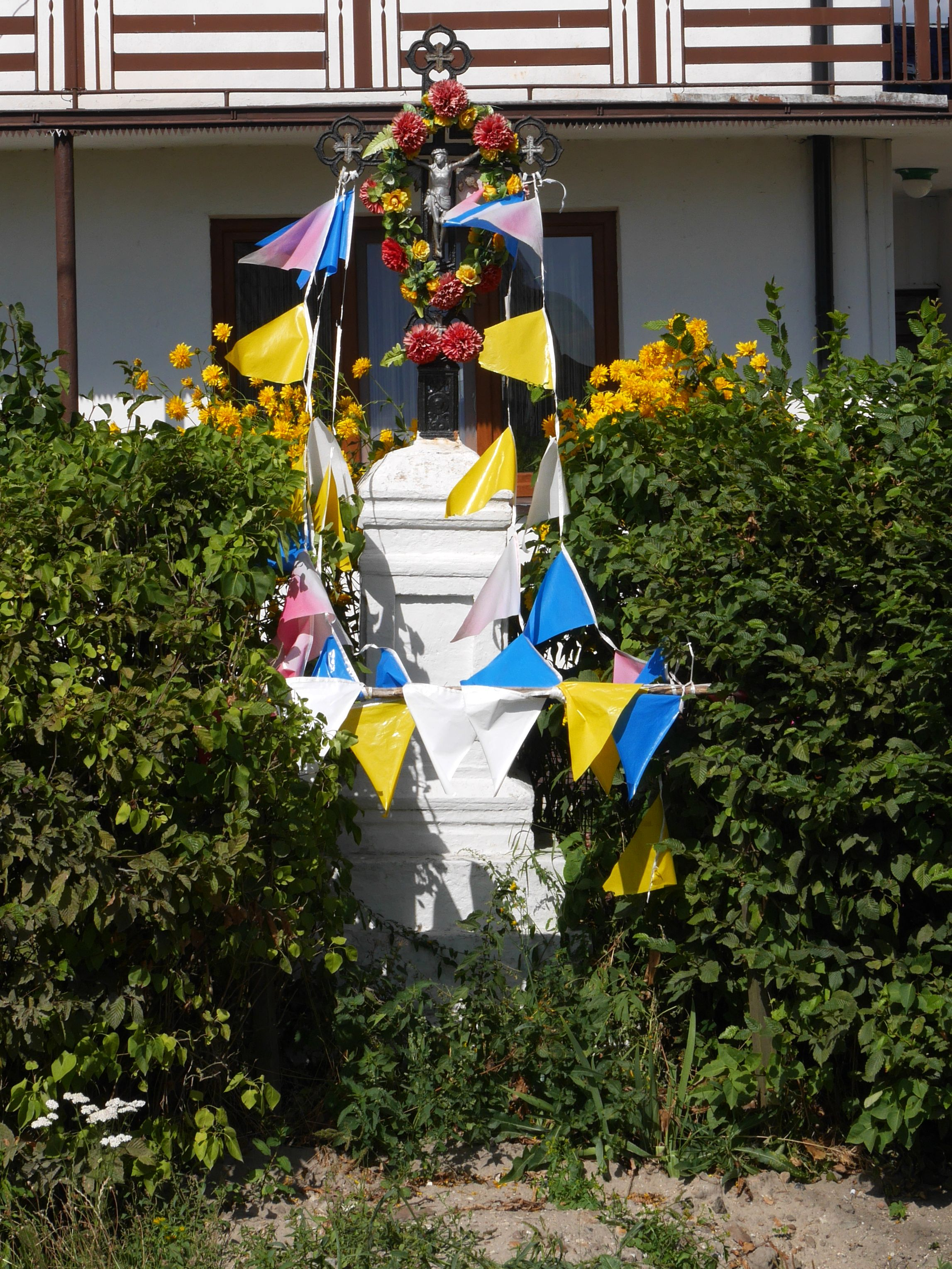

- Location within Poland
- Coordinates: 50°33′5″N 20°48′4″E
- Country: Poland
- Voivodeship: Świętokrzyskie
- County: Busko
- Gmina: Gnojno
- Population (approx.): 150

Bugaj [ˈbuɡai̯] is a village in the administrative district of Gmina Gnojno, within Busko County, Świętokrzyskie Voivodeship, in south-central Poland. It lies approximately 7 km (4 mi) south-west of Gnojno, 12 km (7 mi) north-east of Busko-Zdrój, and 40 km (25 mi) south of the regional capital Kielce.
