= Januszowice =

Januszowice may refer to the following places:

- Januszowice, Gmina Słomniki in Lesser Poland Voivodeship (south Poland)
- Januszowice, Gmina Zielonki in Lesser Poland Voivodeship (south Poland)
- Januszowice, Busko County in Świętokrzyskie Voivodeship (south-central Poland)
- Januszowice, Pińczów County in Świętokrzyskie Voivodeship (south-central Poland)
