= Płośnia =

- Village
- Location within Poland
- Coordinates: 50°38′N 20°54′E
- Country: Poland
- Voivodeship: Świętokrzyskie
- County: Busko
- Gmina: Gnojno

Płośnia [ˈpwɔɕɲa] is a village in the administrative district of Gmina Gnojno, within Busko County, Świętokrzyskie Voivodeship, in south-central Poland. It lies approximately 6 km (4 mi) north-east of Gnojno, 23 km (14 mi) north-east of Busko-Zdrój, and 35 km (22 mi) south-east of the regional capital Kielce.
