= Studzianki Pancerne =

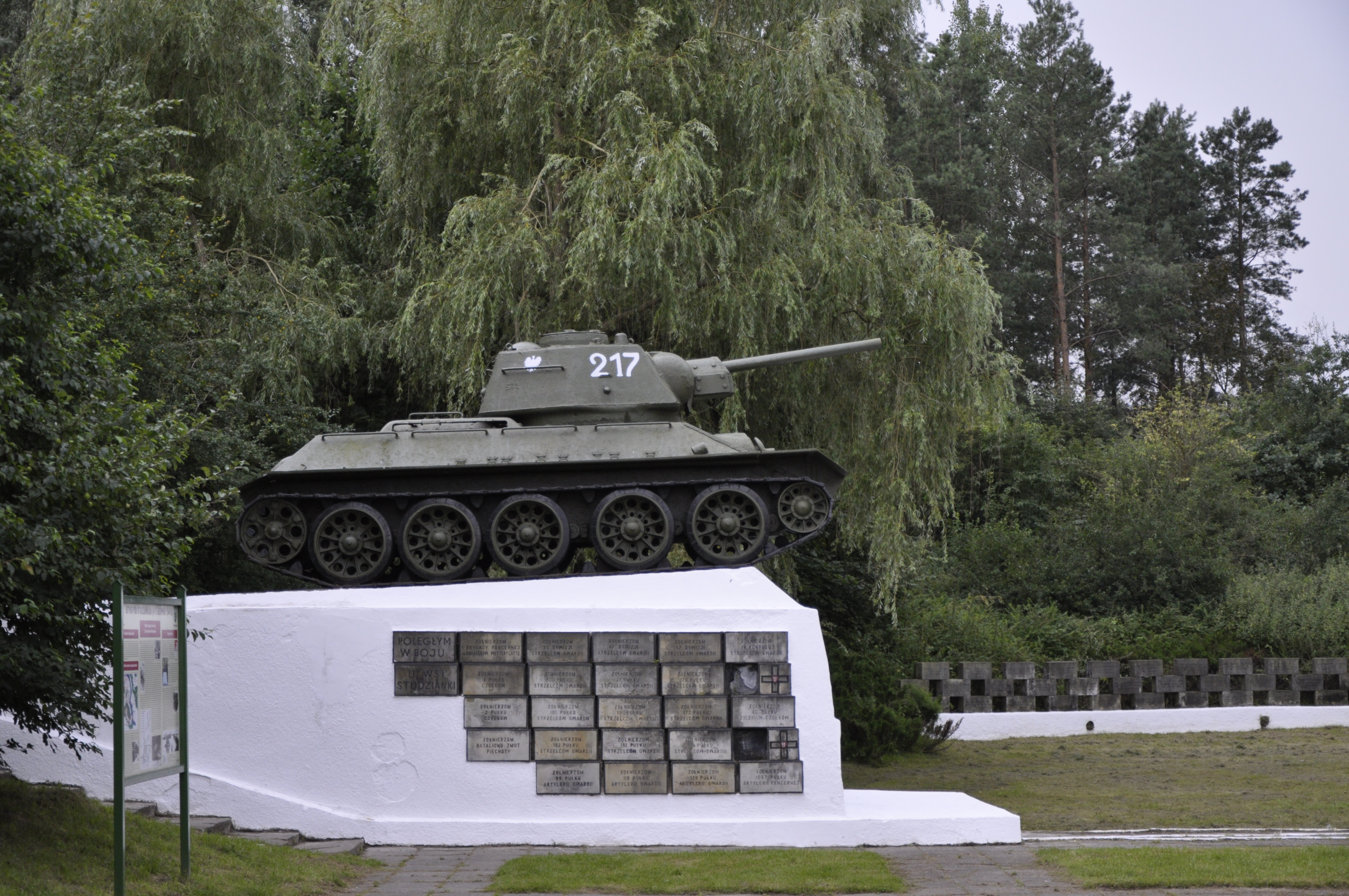
- Memorial to the fallen in the battle of Studzianki

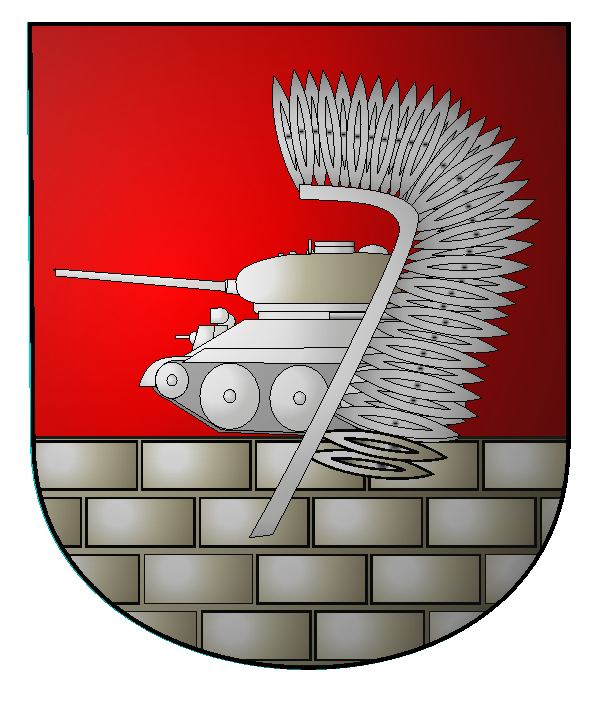
- Coat of arms

- Location within Poland
- Coordinates: 51°41′18″N 21°19′34″E
- Country: Poland
- Voivodeship: Masovian
- County: Kozienice
- Gmina: Głowaczów

Population (2006)
  - Total: 190
- Time zone: UTC+1 (CET)
  - Summer (DST): UTC+2 (CEST)
- Area code: +48 48
- Car plates: WKZ

Studzianki Pancerne [stuˈd͡ʑaŋki panˈt͡sɛrnɛ] (until 1969 Studzianki) is a village in Poland, in the Masovian Voivodeship, near Kozienice and Głowaczów. The village was a battlefield of a major armoured engagement that took place there between August 9 and August 16 of 1944, battle of Studzianki.

During what became known as the Battle of Studzianki, the Soviet 8th Army, aided by elements of the Polish 1st Armoured Brigade of the 1st Belorussian Front, defeated an armoured counter-attack carried out by three German divisions, including the infamous Fallschirm-Panzer Division 1 Hermann Göring. To commemorate the battle, in 1969 the name of the village was changed to include the word Pancerne ('armoured' in Polish). Studzianki Pancerne was the first small village to get a coat of arms in the post-war era, the coat of arms was designed by Szymon Kobyliński.
