= Wola Zofiowska =

- Village
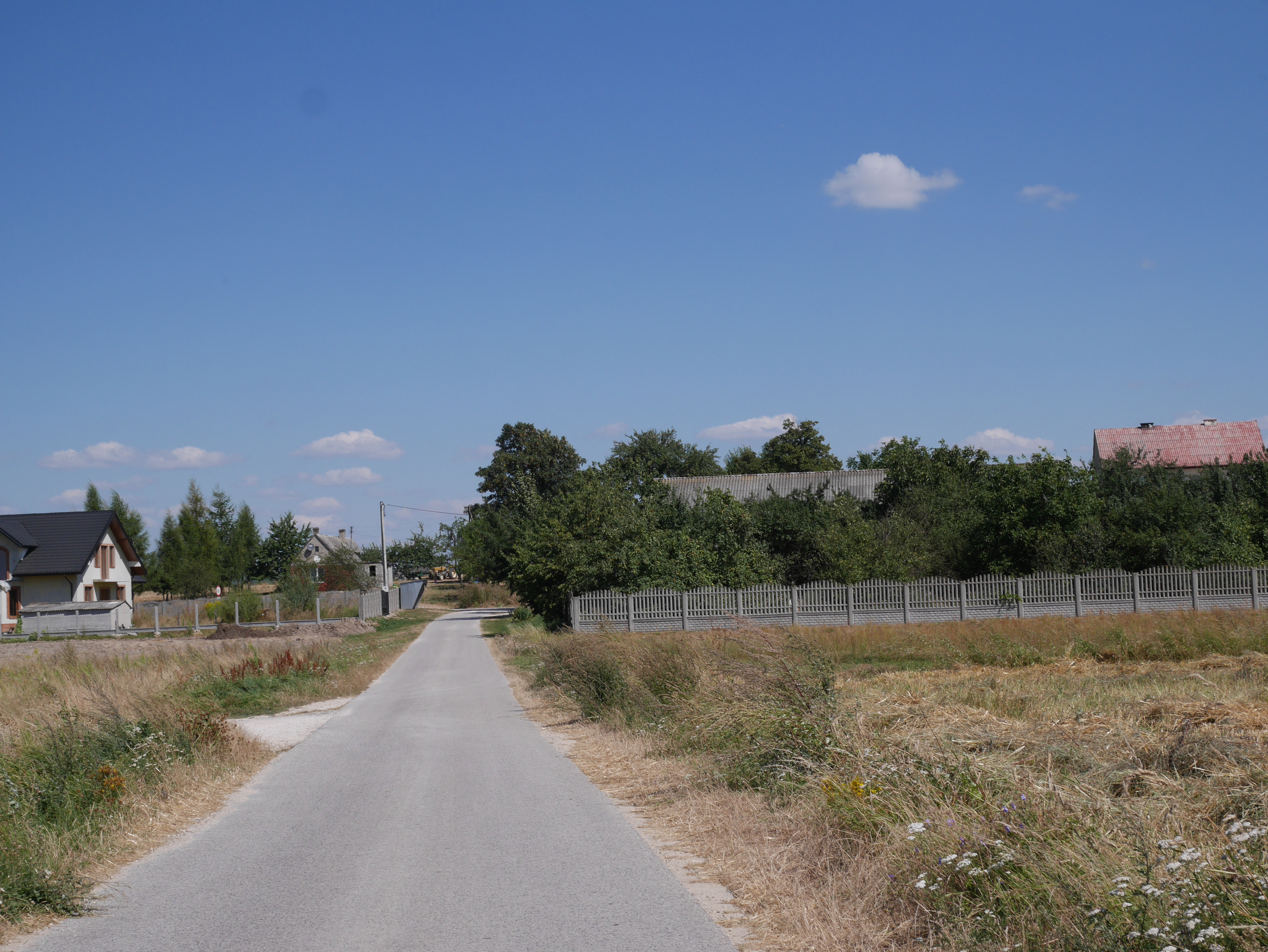

- Location within Poland
- Coordinates: 50°35′37″N 20°54′14″E
- Country: Poland
- Voivodeship: Świętokrzyskie
- County: Busko
- Gmina: Gnojno

Wola Zofiowska [ˈvɔla zɔˈfjɔfska] is a village in the administrative district of Gmina Gnojno, within Busko County, Świętokrzyskie Voivodeship, in south-central Poland. It lies approximately 5 km (3 mi) east of Gnojno, 20 km (12 mi) north-east of Busko-Zdrój, and 38 km (24 mi) south-east of the regional capital Kielce.
