= Emilów =

- Village
- Location within Poland
- Coordinates: 51°39′N 21°20′E
- Country: Poland
- Voivodeship: Masovian
- County: Kozienice
- Gmina: Głowaczów

Emilów [ɛˈmiluf] is a village in the administrative district of Gmina Głowaczów, within Kozienice County, Masovian Voivodeship, in east-central Poland.
