= Michałów, Kozienice County =

Village in Gmina Głowaczów, Poland

Michałów
- Village
- Location within Poland
- Coordinates: 51°39′13″N 21°21′04″E
- Country: Poland
- Voivodeship: Masovian
- County: Kozienice
- Gmina: Głowaczów

Michałów [miˈxawuf] is a village in the administrative district of Gmina Głowaczów, within Kozienice County, Masovian Voivodeship, in east-central Poland.
