= Gmina Głowaczów =

Gmina Głowaczów Głowaczów Commune
- Gmina
- Flag Coat of arms
- Interactive map of Gmina Głowaczów
- Coordinates (Głowaczów): 51°37′16″N 21°19′8″E
- Country: Poland
- Voivodeship: Masovian
- County: Kozienice
- Seat: Głowaczów

Area
  - Total: 186.26 km^{2} (71.92 sq mi)

Population (2006)
  - Total: 7,292
  - Density: 39.15/km^{2} (101.4/sq mi)
- Website: http://www.glowaczow.pl/

Gmina Głowaczów is a rural gmina (administrative district) in Kozienice County, Masovian Voivodeship, in east-central Poland. Its seat is the village of Głowaczów, which lies approximately 18 kilometres (11 mi) west of Kozienice and 70 km (43 mi) south of Warsaw.

The gmina covers an area of 186.26 square kilometres (71.9 sq mi), and as of 2006 its total population is 7,292.

== Villages ==
Gmina Głowaczów contains the villages and settlements of Adamów, Bobrowniki, Brzóza, Cecylówka, Cecylówka-Brzózka, Chodków, Dąbrówki, Emilów, Głowaczów, Grabnowola, Helenów, Henryków, Ignacówka, Ignacówka Bobrowska, Jasieniec, Klementynów, Kosny, Leżenice, Lipa, Lipska Wola, Łukawa, Łukawska Wola, Maciejowice, Mariampol, Marianów, Michałów, Miejska Dąbrowa, Moniochy, Podmieście, Przejazd, Rogożek, Sewerynów, Stanisławów, Stawki, Studnie, Studzianki Pancerne, Ursynów, Wólka Brzózka and Zieleniec.

== Neighbouring gminas ==
Gmina Głowaczów is bordered by the gminas of Grabów nad Pilicą, Jastrzębia, Jedlińsk, Kozienice, Magnuszew, Pionki and Stromiec.
