= Ignacówka, Masovian Voivodeship =

Ignacówka
- Village
- Location within Poland
- Coordinates: 51°34′N 21°18′E
- Country: Poland
- Voivodeship: Masovian
- County: Kozienice
- Gmina: Głowaczów

Ignacówka [iɡnaˈt͡sufka] is a village in the administrative district of Gmina Głowaczów, within Kozienice County, Masovian Voivodeship, in east-central Poland.
