= Dąbrówki, Gmina Głowaczów =

Dąbrówki
- Village
- Location within Poland
- Coordinates: 51°40′17″N 21°18′46″E
- Country: Poland
- Voivodeship: Masovian
- County: Kozienice
- Gmina: Głowaczów
- Population: 60

Dąbrówki (Polish pronunciation: [dɔmˈbrufkʲi]) is a village in the administrative district of Gmina Głowaczów, within Kozienice County, Masovian Voivodeship, in east-central Poland.
