= Bobrowniki, Masovian Voivodeship =

Bobrowniki
- Village
- Location within Poland
- Coordinates: 51°35′57″N 21°17′24″E
- Country: Poland
- Voivodeship: Masovian
- County: Kozienice
- Gmina: Głowaczów
- Population: 480

Bobrowniki [bɔbrɔvˈniki] is a village in the administrative district of Gmina Głowaczów, within Kozienice County, Masovian Voivodeship, in east-central Poland.
