= Klementynów =

Klementynów may refer to the following places:

- Klementynów, Łódź Voivodeship (central Poland)
- Klementynów, Lublin Voivodeship (east Poland)
- Klementynów, Masovian Voivodeship (east-central Poland)
