= Helenów, Kozienice County =

Helenów
- Village
- Location within Poland
- Coordinates: 51°38′33″N 21°14′31″E
- Country: Poland
- Voivodeship: Masovian
- County: Kozienice
- Gmina: Głowaczów

Helenów [xɛˈlɛnuf] is a village in the administrative district of Gmina Głowaczów, within Kozienice County, Masovian Voivodeship, in east-central Poland.
