= Raczyce, Świętokrzyskie Voivodeship =

Raczyce
- Village
- Location within Poland
- Coordinates: 50°34′20″N 20°53′20″E
- Country: Poland
- Voivodeship: Świętokrzyskie
- County: Busko
- Gmina: Gnojno

Raczyce [raˈt͡ʂɨt͡sɛ] is a village in the administrative district of Gmina Gnojno, within Busko County, Świętokrzyskie Voivodeship, in south-central Poland. It lies approximately 5 km (3 mi) south-east of Gnojno, 17 km (11 mi) north-east of Busko-Zdrój, and 40 km (25 mi) south-east of the regional capital Kielce.
