= Ignacówka Bobrowska =

- Village
- Location within Poland
- Coordinates: 51°33′41″N 21°16′52″E
- Country: Poland
- Voivodeship: Masovian
- County: Kozienice
- Gmina: Głowaczów

Ignacówka Bobrowska [iɡnaˈt͡sufka bɔˈbrɔfska] is a village in the administrative district of Gmina Głowaczów, within Kozienice County, Masovian Voivodeship, in east-central Poland.
