= Ruda, Busko County =

Ruda
- Village
- Location within Poland
- Coordinates: 50°32′54″N 20°55′02″E
- Country: Poland
- Voivodeship: Świętokrzyskie
- County: Busko
- Gmina: Gnojno

Ruda [ˈruda] is a village in the administrative district of Gmina Gnojno, within Busko County, Świętokrzyskie Voivodeship, in south-central Poland.
