= Gmina Gnojno =

Gmina Gnojno Gnojno Commune
- Gmina
- Coat of arms
- Interactive map of Gmina Gnojno
- Coordinates (Gnojno): 50°36′11″N 20°50′40″E
- Country: Poland
- Voivodeship: Świętokrzyskie
- County: Busko
- Seat: Gnojno

Area
  - Total: 95.66 km^{2} (36.93 sq mi)

Population (2006)
  - Total: 4,735
  - Density: 49.50/km^{2} (128.2/sq mi)
- Website: http://www.gnojno.gminy.com.pl

Gmina Gnojno is a rural gmina (administrative district) in Busko County, Świętokrzyskie Voivodeship, in south-central Poland. Its seat is the village of Gnojno, which lies approximately 18 kilometres (11 mi) north-east of Busko-Zdrój and 35 km (22 mi) south-east of the regional capital Kielce.

The gmina covers an area of 95.66 square kilometres (36.9 sq mi), and as of 2006 its total population is 4,735.

== Villages ==
Gmina Gnojno contains the villages and settlements of Balice, Bugaj, Falki, Glinka, Gnojno, Gorzakiew, Grabki Małe, Janowice Poduszowskie, Janowice Raczyckie, Januszowice, Jarząbki, Kostera, Maciejowice, Płośnia, Poręba, Pożogi, Raczyce, Ruda, Rzeszutki, Skadla, Wola Bokrzycka, Wola Zofiowska, Wólka Bosowska, Zagrody, Zawada and Zofiówka.

== Neighbouring gminas ==
Gmina Gnojno is bordered by the gminas of Busko-Zdrój, Chmielnik, Pierzchnica, Stopnica, Szydłów and Tuczępy.
