= Lipa, Kozienice County =

Lipa
- Village
- Location within Poland
- Coordinates: 51°38′7″N 21°16′46″E
- Country: Poland
- Voivodeship: Masovian
- County: Kozienice
- Gmina: Głowaczów
- Population: 220

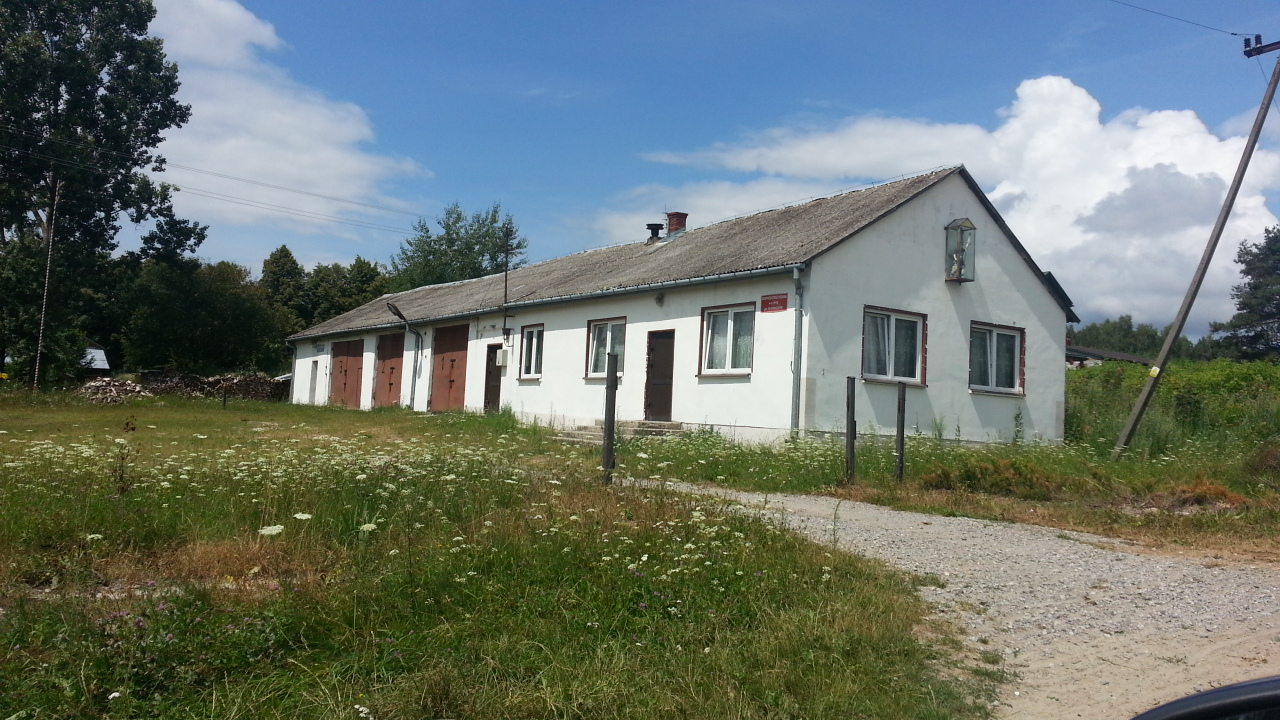
The volunteer fire department building in lipa.

Lipa [ˈlipa] is a village in the administrative district of Gmina Głowaczów, within Kozienice County, Masovian Voivodeship, in east-central Poland.
