= Marianów, Gmina Głowaczów =

Marianów
- Village
- Location within Poland
- Coordinates: 51°33′19″N 21°23′40″E
- Country: Poland
- Voivodeship: Masovian
- County: Kozienice
- Gmina: Głowaczów

Marianów [maˈrjanuf] is a village in the administrative district of Gmina Głowaczów, within Kozienice County, Masovian Voivodeship, in east-central Poland.
