= Chodków =

- Village
- Location within Poland
- Coordinates: 51°40′7″N 21°23′7″E
- Country: Poland
- Voivodeship: Masovian
- County: Kozienice
- Gmina: Głowaczów
- Population: 71

Chodków [ˈxɔtkuf] is a village in the administrative district of Gmina Głowaczów, within Kozienice County, Masovian Voivodeship, in east-central Poland.
