= Adamów, Kozienice County =

Adamów
- Village
- Location within Poland
- Coordinates: 51°38′N 21°23′E
- Country: Poland
- Voivodeship: Masovian
- County: Kozienice
- Gmina: Głowaczów

Adamów [aˈdamuf] is a village in the administrative district of Gmina Głowaczów, within Kozienice County, Masovian Voivodeship, in east-central Poland.
