= Jasieniec, Kozienice County =

Jasieniec
- Village
- Location within Poland
- Coordinates: 51°39′24″N 21°16′27″E
- Country: Poland
- Voivodeship: Masovian
- County: Kozienice
- Gmina: Głowaczów

Jasieniec [jaˈɕɛɲɛt͡s] is a village in the administrative district of Gmina Głowaczów, within Kozienice County, Masovian Voivodeship, in east-central Poland.
