= Brzóza =

- Village
- Location within Poland
- Coordinates: 51°36′N 21°21′E
- Country: Poland
- Voivodeship: Masovian
- County: Kozienice
- Gmina: Głowaczów
- Population: 1,100
- Website: www.brzoza.ir.pl

Brzóza [ˈbʐuza] is a village in the administrative district of Gmina Głowaczów, within Kozienice County, Masovian Voivodeship, in east-central Poland.
