= Pożogi =

- Village
- Location within Poland
- Coordinates: 50°36′N 20°50′E
- Country: Poland
- Voivodeship: Świętokrzyskie
- County: Busko
- Gmina: Gnojno

Pożogi [pɔˈʐɔɡi] is a village in the administrative district of Gmina Gnojno, within Busko County, Świętokrzyskie Voivodeship, in south-central Poland. It lies approximately 17 km (11 mi) north-east of Busko-Zdrój and 35 km (22 mi) south-east of the regional capital Kielce.
