= Januszowice, Busko County =

Januszowice
- Village
- Location within Poland
- Coordinates: 50°34′56″N 20°51′59″E
- Country: Poland
- Voivodeship: Świętokrzyskie
- County: Busko
- Gmina: Gnojno

Januszowice [januʂɔˈvit͡sɛ] is a village in the administrative district of Gmina Gnojno, within Busko County, Świętokrzyskie Voivodeship, in south-central Poland. It lies approximately 3 km (2 mi) south-east of Gnojno, 17 km (11 mi) north-east of Busko-Zdrój, and 38 km (24 mi) south-east of the regional capital Kielce.
