= Henryków, Kozienice County =

Henryków
- Village
- Location within Poland
- Coordinates: 51°38′43″N 21°15′50″E
- Country: Poland
- Voivodeship: Masovian
- County: Kozienice
- Gmina: Głowaczów

Henryków (Polish pronunciation: [xɛnˈrɨkuf]) is a village in the administrative district of Gmina Głowaczów, within Kozienice County, Masovian Voivodeship, in east-central Poland.
