= Cecylówka-Brzózka =

- Village
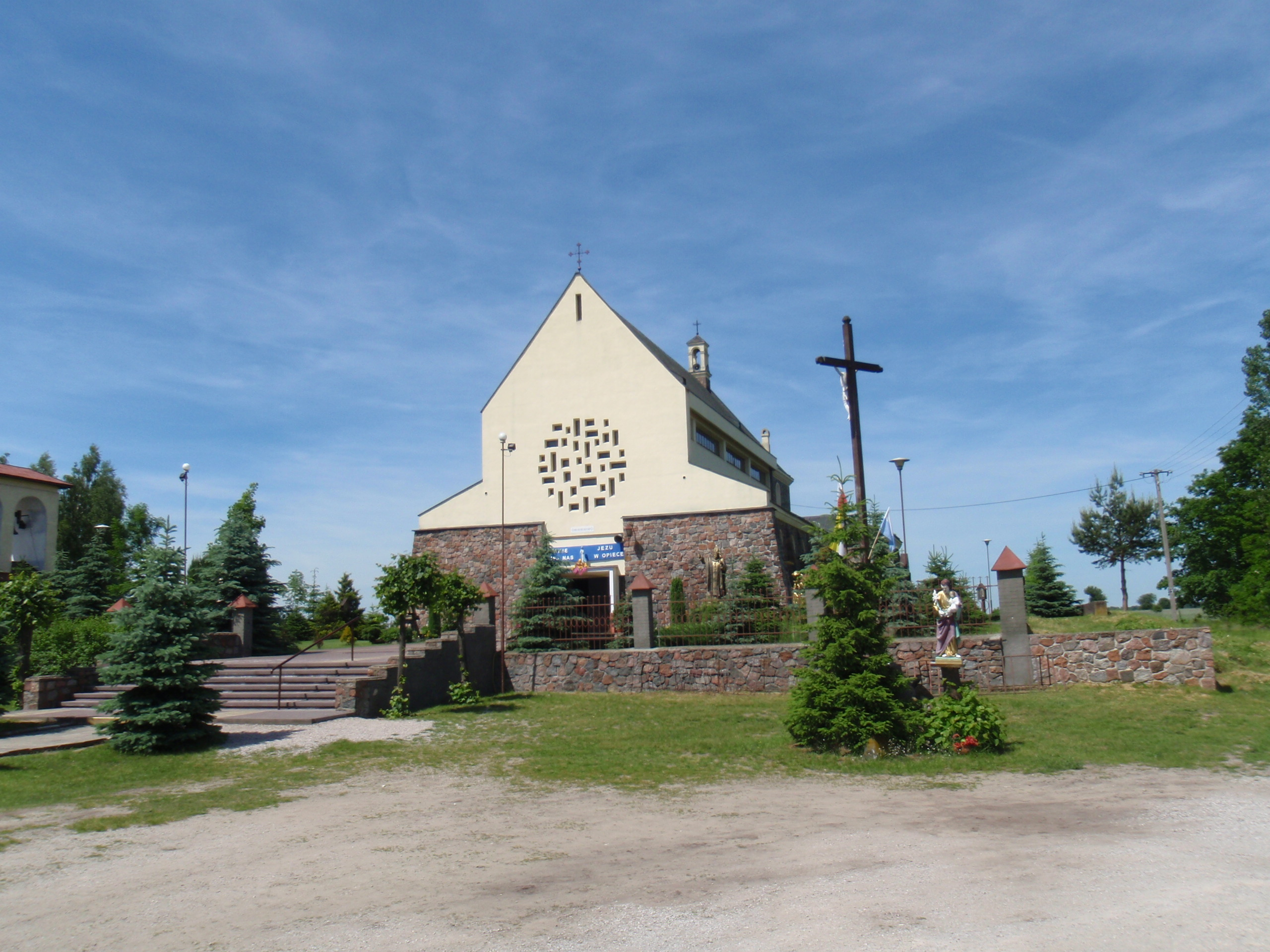
- Church in Cecylówka Brzózka

- Location within Poland
- Coordinates: 51°33′00″N 21°21′28″E
- Country: Poland
- Voivodeship: Masovian
- County: Kozienice
- Gmina: Głowaczów

Cecylówka-Brzózka [t͡sɛt͡sɨˈlufka ˈbʐuska] is a village in the administrative district of Gmina Głowaczów, within Kozienice County, Masovian Voivodeship, in east-central Poland.
