= Zieleniec, Kozienice County =

Zieleniec
- Village
- Location within Poland
- Coordinates: 51°36′N 21°14′E
- Country: Poland
- Voivodeship: Masovian
- County: Kozienice
- Gmina: Głowaczów

Zieleniec [ʑɛˈlɛɲɛt͡s] is a village in the administrative district of Gmina Głowaczów, within Kozienice County, Masovian Voivodeship, in east-central Poland.
