= Łukawa, Masovian Voivodeship =

Łukawa
- Village
- Location within Poland
- Coordinates: 51°31′22″N 21°15′8″E
- Country: Poland
- Voivodeship: Masovian
- County: Kozienice
- Gmina: Głowaczów

Łukawa [wuˈkava] is a village in the administrative district of Gmina Głowaczów, within Kozienice County, Masovian Voivodeship, in east-central Poland.
