= Stanisławów, Kozienice County =

Stanisławów
- Village
- Location within Poland
- Coordinates: 51°34′17″N 21°23′42″E
- Country: Poland
- Voivodeship: Masovian
- County: Kozienice
- Gmina: Głowaczów

Stanisławów [staniˈswavuf] is a village in the administrative district of Gmina Głowaczów, within Kozienice County, Masovian Voivodeship, in east-central Poland.
