= Maciejowice, Świętokrzyskie Voivodeship =

Maciejowice
- Village
- Location within Poland
- Coordinates: 50°33′55″N 20°52′19″E
- Country: Poland
- Voivodeship: Świętokrzyskie
- County: Busko
- Gmina: Gnojno

Maciejowice [mat͡ɕɛjɔˈvit͡sɛ] is a village in the administrative district of Gmina Gnojno, within Busko County, Świętokrzyskie Voivodeship, in south-central Poland. It lies approximately 5 km (3 mi) south-east of Gnojno, 16 km (10 mi) north-east of Busko-Zdrój, and 40 km (25 mi) south-east of the regional capital Kielce.
