= Podmieście, Gmina Głowaczów =

Podmieście
- Village
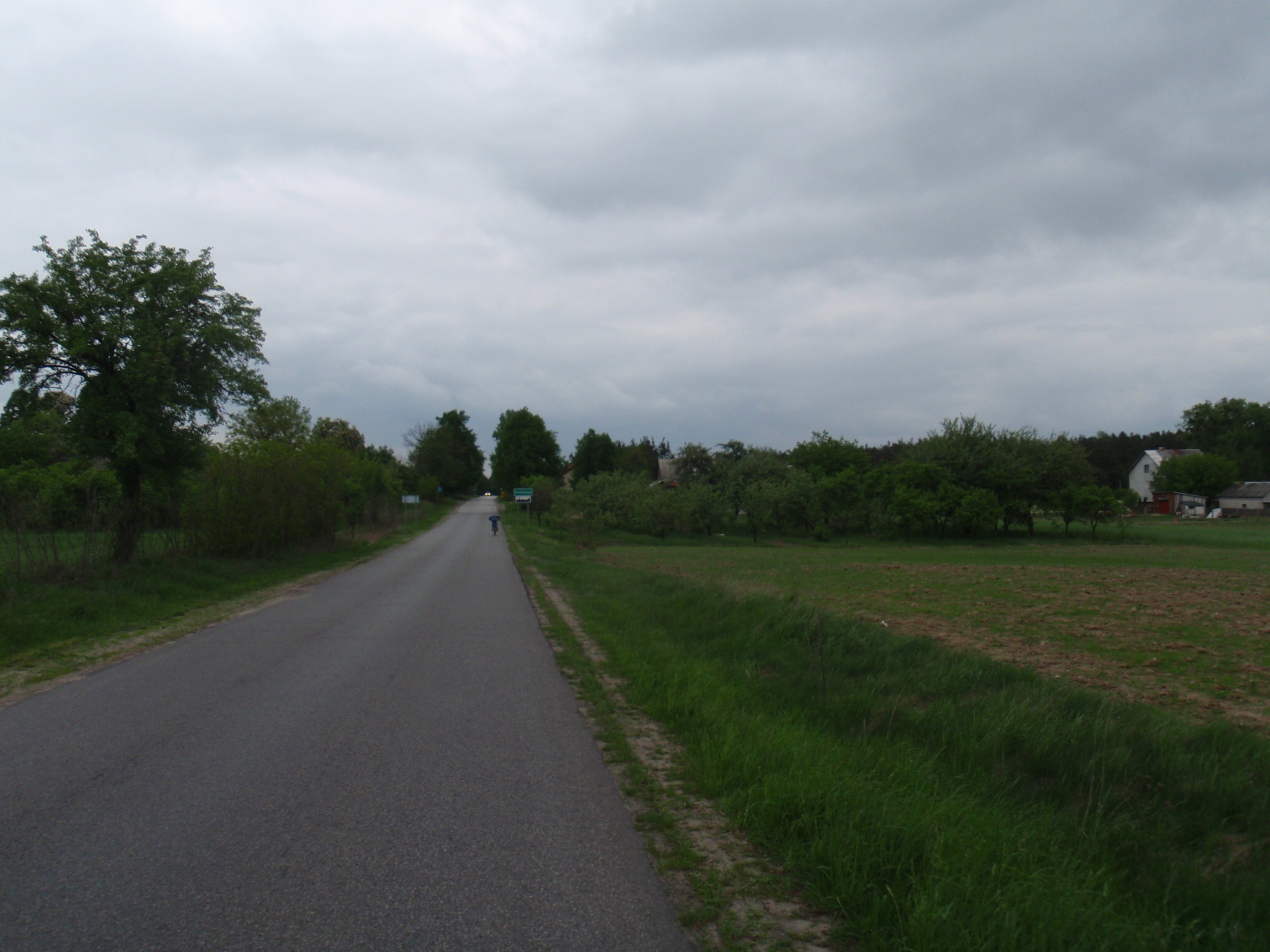
- Street of Podmiescie gmina Glowaczow

- Location within Poland
- Coordinates: 51°39′13″N 21°21′4″E
- Country: Poland
- Voivodeship: Masovian
- County: Kozienice
- Gmina: Głowaczów

Podmieście [pɔdˈmjɛɕt͡ɕɛ] is a village in the administrative district of Gmina Głowaczów, within Kozienice County, Masovian Voivodeship, in east-central Poland.
