= Głowaczów, Masovian Voivodeship =

Głowaczów
- Town
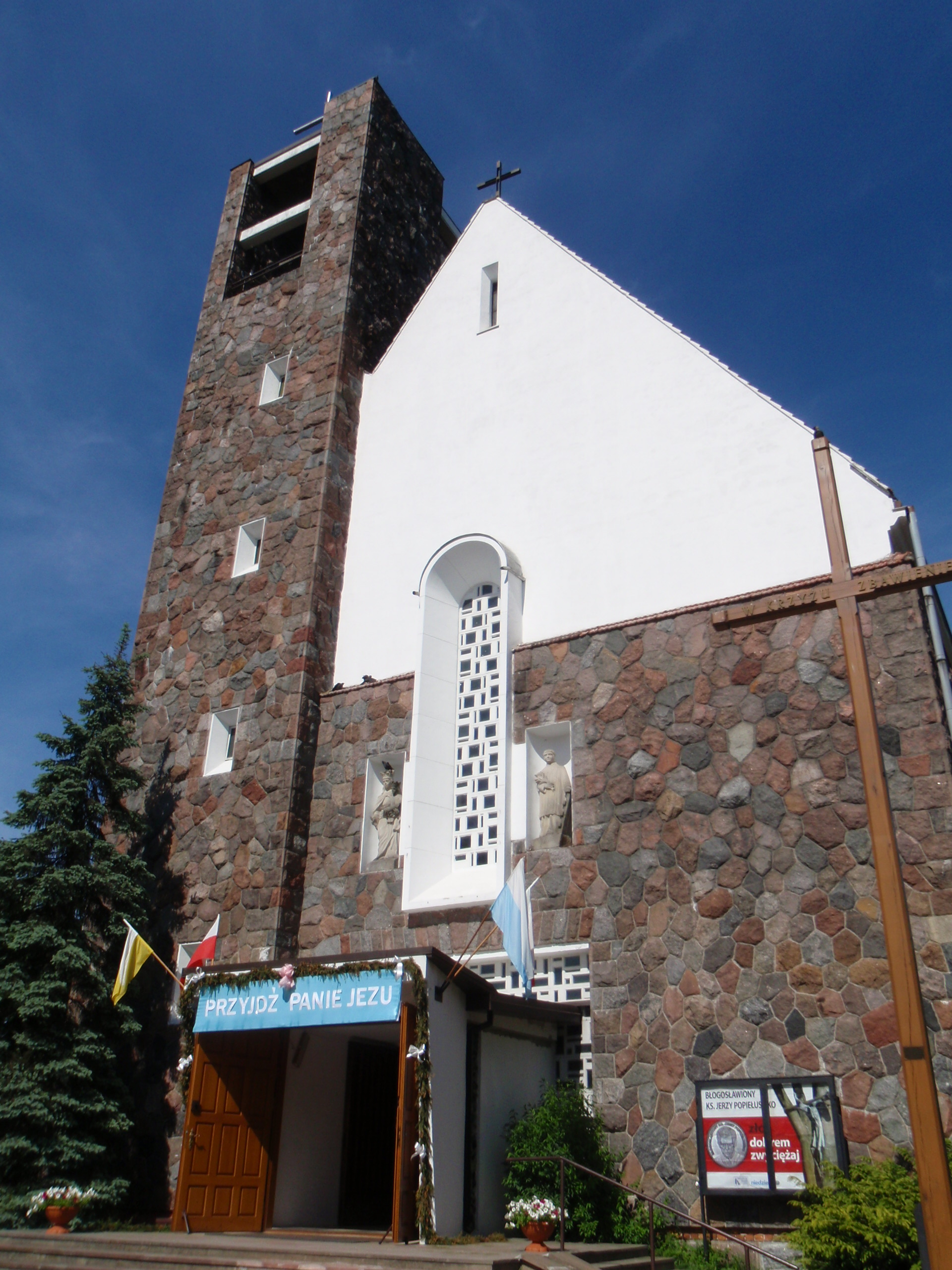
- Saint Lawrence Church

- Flag Coat of arms

- Location within Poland
- Coordinates: 51°37′N 21°19′E
- Country: Poland
- Voivodeship: Masovian
- County: Kozienice
- Gmina: Głowaczów
- Founded: 1445
- Town rights: 1445

Government
  - Mayor: Hubert Czubaj
  - Deputy Mayor: Robert Kowalczyk

Population (2024)
  - Total: 826
- Time zone: UTC+1 (CET)
  - Summer (DST): UTC+2 (CEST)
- Postal code: 26-903
- Vehicle registration: WKZ

Głowaczów [ɡwɔˈvat͡ʂuf] is a town in Kozienice County, Masovian Voivodeship, in east-central Poland. It is the seat of the gmina (administrative district) called Gmina Głowaczów.

== History ==
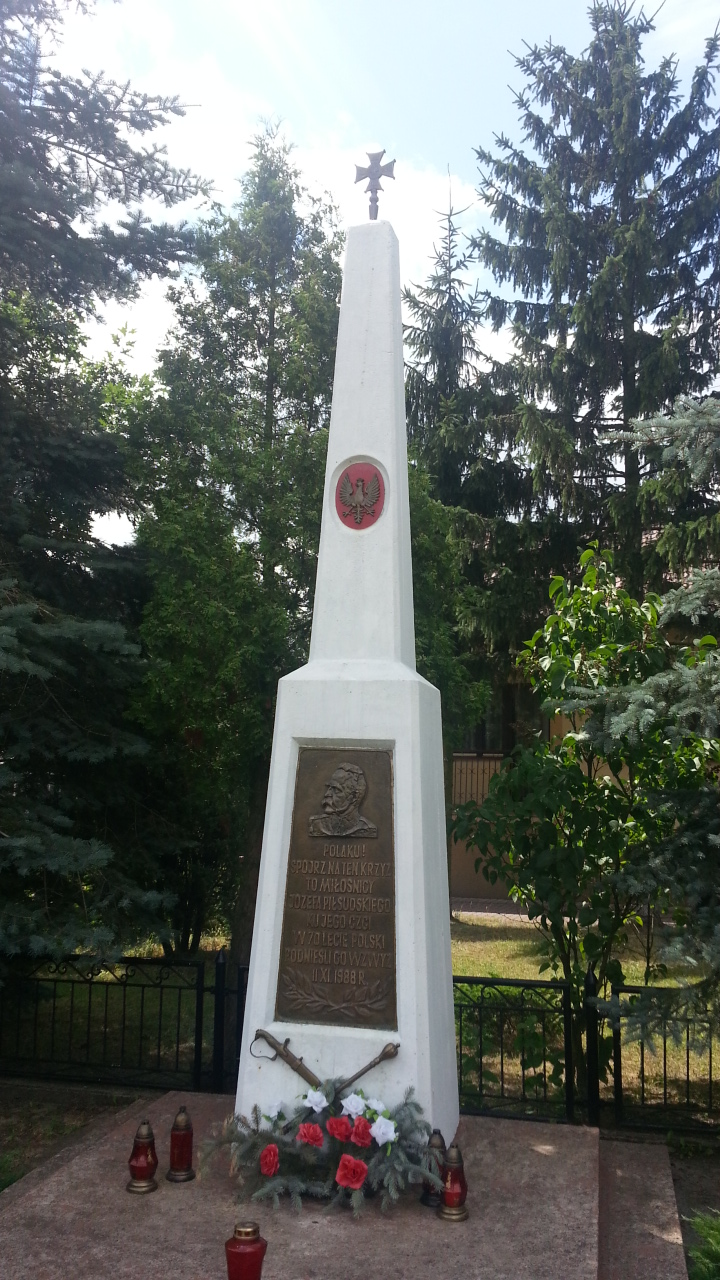
Memorial to Józef Piłsudski from 1988

Głowaczów was founded and granted town rights in 1445 by a nobleman named Sędziwój Leżeński Głowacz (Nałęcz coat of arms), and later on, it belonged to the families of Leżeński, Boski and Ostroróg. The town with its two churches (one from 1390, another from 1445) was destroyed by Swedish invaders in the deluge (1655). New church was built in 1675, to be destroyed by Germans in 1944. Głowaczów was administratively located in the Sandomierz Voivodeship in the Lesser Poland Province until 1795 (see Partitions of Poland). In the 19th century, it was part of Russian-controlled Congress Poland (1815-1915). In the second half of the 17th century, Głowaczów emerged as a local center of Jewish culture. Here, on February 15, 1864, one of battles of the January Uprising took place, and in 1869, the Russians stripped it of its town charter. In 1921, already in Second Polish Republic’s Kielce Voivodeship, Głowaczów had 2271 inhabitants, including 1411 Jews.

During the German invasion of Poland, which started World War II in September 1939, several skirmishes between the advancing Wehrmacht and the retreating units of Armia Prusy took place here. The village was partly destroyed, and in the spring 1940, all residents of Głowaczów were forced to leave their houses, as German authorities built airforce training facilities. Its Jewish residents were murdered in late 1942 in Treblinka extermination camp.
