= Maciejowice, Kozienice County =

Maciejowice
- Village
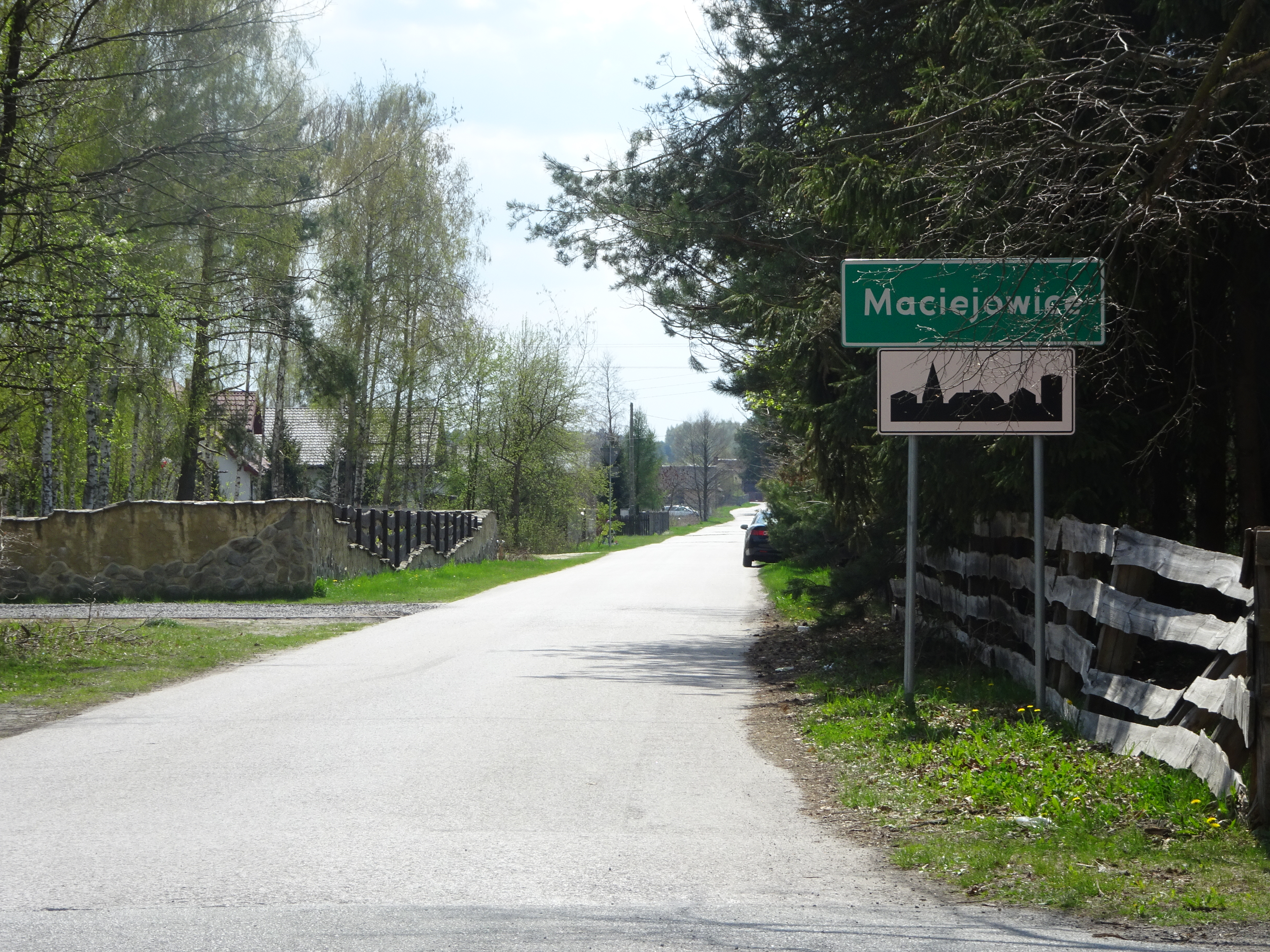

- Location within Poland
- Coordinates: 51°34′41″N 21°25′3″E
- Country: Poland
- Voivodeship: Masovian
- County: Kozienice
- Gmina: Głowaczów

Maciejowice [mat͡ɕɛjɔˈvit͡sɛ] is a village in the administrative district of Gmina Głowaczów, within Kozienice County, Masovian Voivodeship, in east-central Poland.
