= Gnojno, Świętokrzyskie Voivodeship =

Gnojno
- Village
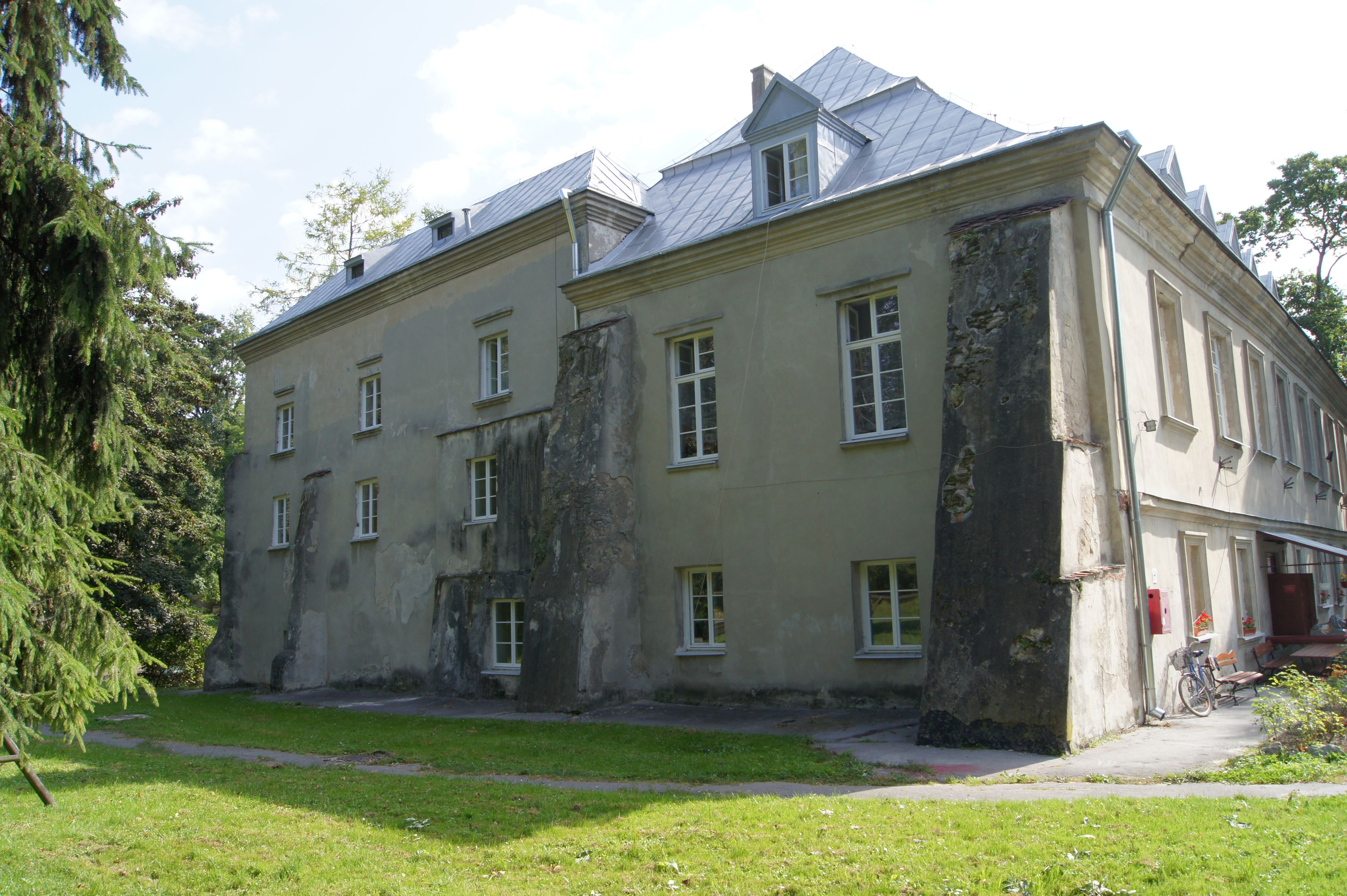

- Coat of arms

- Location within Poland
- Coordinates: 50°36′11″N 20°50′40″E
- Country: Poland
- Voivodeship: Świętokrzyskie
- County: Busko
- Gmina: Gnojno

Gnojno [ˈɡnɔi̯nɔ] is a village in Busko County, Świętokrzyskie Voivodeship, in south-central Poland. It is the seat of the gmina (administrative district) called Gmina Gnojno. It lies approximately 18 km (11 mi) north-east of Busko-Zdrój and 35 km (22 mi) south-east of the regional capital Kielce.
