= Śladków =

Śladków may refer to the following places in Poland:

- Śladków Duży
- Śladków Górny
- Śladków Mały
- Śladków Podleśny
- Śladków Rozlazły
