= Jasień, Gmina Chmielnik =

Jasień
- Village
- Location within Poland
- Coordinates: 50°36′53″N 20°42′18″E
- Country: Poland
- Voivodeship: Świętokrzyskie
- County: Kielce
- Gmina: Chmielnik
- Population: 190

Jasień [ˈjaɕɛɲ] is a village in the administrative district of Gmina Chmielnik, within Kielce County, Świętokrzyskie Voivodeship, in south-central Poland. It lies approximately 4 km (2 mi) west of Chmielnik and 31 km (19 mi) south of the regional capital Kielce.
