= Borzykowa, Świętokrzyskie Voivodeship =

Borzykowa
- Village
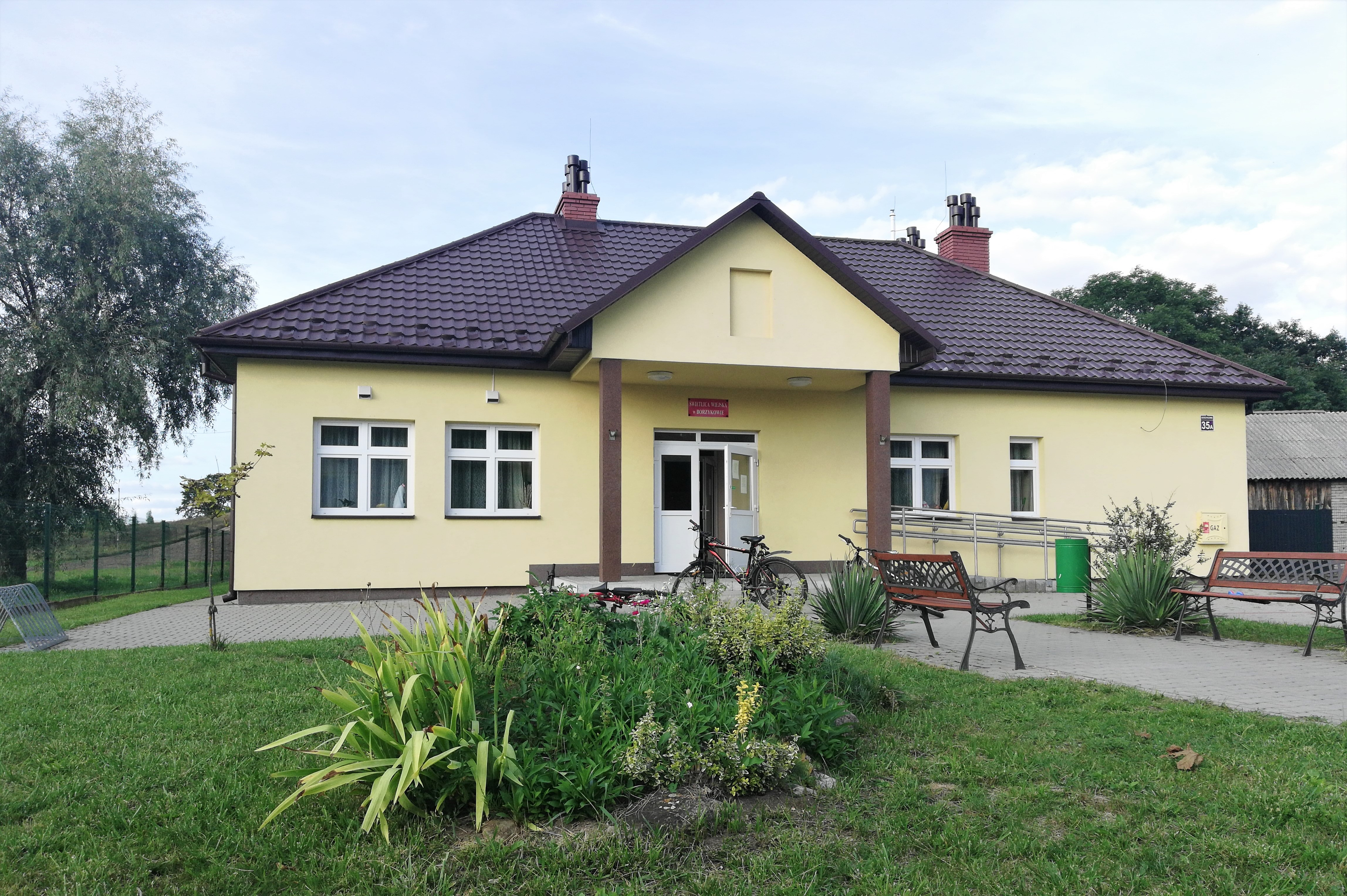

- Location within Poland
- Coordinates: 50°33′17″N 20°46′10″E
- Country: Poland
- Voivodeship: Świętokrzyskie
- County: Kielce
- Gmina: Chmielnik
- Population: 320

Borzykowa [bɔʐɨˈkɔva] is a village in the administrative district of Gmina Chmielnik, within Kielce County, Świętokrzyskie Voivodeship, in south-central Poland. It lies approximately 7 km (4 mi) south of Chmielnik and 39 km (24 mi) south of the regional capital Kielce.
