= Celiny, Gmina Chmielnik =

Celiny
- Village
- Location within Poland
- Coordinates: 50°39′8″N 20°41′47″E
- Country: Poland
- Voivodeship: Świętokrzyskie
- County: Kielce
- Gmina: Chmielnik
- Population: 340

Celiny [t͡sɛˈlinɨ] is a village in the administrative district of Gmina Chmielnik, within Kielce County, Świętokrzyskie Voivodeship, in south-central Poland. It lies approximately 6 km (4 mi) north-west of Chmielnik and 27 km (17 mi) south of the regional capital Kielce.
