= Zrecze Duże =

- Village
- Location within Poland
- Coordinates: 50°36′27″N 20°48′5″E
- Country: Poland
- Voivodeship: Świętokrzyskie
- County: Kielce
- Gmina: Chmielnik

Zrecze Duże [ˈzrɛt͡ʂɛ ˈduʐɛ] is a village in the administrative district of Gmina Chmielnik, within Kielce County, Świętokrzyskie Voivodeship, in south-central Poland. It lies approximately 4 km (2 mi) east of Chmielnik and 34 km (21 mi) south-east of the regional capital Kielce.
