= Szyszczyce, Kielce County =

Szyszczyce
- Village
- Location within Poland
- Coordinates: 50°35′11″N 20°46′25″E
- Country: Poland
- Voivodeship: Świętokrzyskie
- County: Kielce
- Gmina: Chmielnik
- Population: 260

Szyszczyce [ʂɨʂˈt͡ʂɨt͡sɛ] is a village in the administrative district of Gmina Chmielnik, within Kielce County, Świętokrzyskie Voivodeship, in south-central Poland. It lies approximately 4 km (2 mi) south-east of Chmielnik and 35 km (22 mi) south of the regional capital Kielce.
