= Suskrajowice =

- Village
- Location within Poland
- Coordinates: 50°33′33″N 20°47′14″E
- Country: Poland
- Voivodeship: Świętokrzyskie
- County: Kielce
- Gmina: Chmielnik
- Population: 120

Suskrajowice [suskrajɔˈvit͡sɛ] is a village in the administrative district of Gmina Chmielnik, within Kielce County, Świętokrzyskie Voivodeship, in south-central Poland. It lies approximately 7 km (4 mi) south-east of Chmielnik and 38 km (24 mi) south of the regional capital Kielce.
