= Grabowiec, Świętokrzyskie Voivodeship =

Grabowiec
- Village
- Location within Poland
- Coordinates: 50°40′7″N 20°38′40″E
- Country: Poland
- Voivodeship: Świętokrzyskie
- County: Kielce
- Gmina: Chmielnik
- Population: 310

Grabowiec [ɡraˈbɔvjɛt͡s] is a village in the administrative district of Gmina Chmielnik, within Kielce County, Świętokrzyskie Voivodeship, in south-central Poland. It lies approximately 10 km (6 mi) north-west of Chmielnik and 24 km (15 mi) south of the regional capital Kielce.
