= Suliszów =

Suliszów may refer to the following places:

- Suliszów, Opole Voivodeship (south-west Poland)
- Suliszów, Kielce County in Świętokrzyskie Voivodeship (south-central Poland)
- Suliszów, Sandomierz County in Świętokrzyskie Voivodeship (south-central Poland)
