= Kotlice, Świętokrzyskie Voivodeship =

Kotlice
- Village
- Location within Poland
- Coordinates: 50°33′57″N 20°47′10″E
- Country: Poland
- Voivodeship: Świętokrzyskie
- County: Kielce
- Gmina: Chmielnik
- Population: 120

Kotlice [kɔˈtlit͡sɛ] is a village in the administrative district of Gmina Chmielnik, within Kielce County, Świętokrzyskie Voivodeship, in south-central Poland. It lies approximately 6 km (4 mi) south-east of Chmielnik and 38 km (24 mi) south of the regional capital Kielce.
