= Zrecze Chałupczańskie =

- Village
- Location within Poland
- Coordinates: 50°36′4″N 20°48′0″E
- Country: Poland
- Voivodeship: Świętokrzyskie
- County: Kielce
- Gmina: Chmielnik
- Population: 170 (2,013)

Zrecze Chałupczańskie [ˈzrɛt͡ʂɛ xawupˈt͡ʂaɲskʲɛ] is a village in the administrative district of Gmina Chmielnik, within Kielce County, Świętokrzyskie Voivodeship, in south-central Poland. It lies approximately 4 km (2 mi) east of Chmielnik and 34 km (21 mi) south of the regional capital Kielce.
