= Minostowice =

- Village
- Location within Poland
- Coordinates: 50°39′39″N 20°40′21″E
- Country: Poland
- Voivodeship: Świętokrzyskie
- County: Kielce
- Gmina: Chmielnik
- Population: 210

Minostowice [minɔstɔˈvit͡sɛ] is a village in the administrative district of Gmina Chmielnik, within Kielce County, Świętokrzyskie Voivodeship, in south-central Poland. It lies approximately 8 km (5 mi) north-west of Chmielnik and 25 km (16 mi) south of the regional capital Kielce.
