= Łagiewniki, Kielce County =

Łagiewniki
- Village
- Location within Poland
- Coordinates: 50°37′30″N 20°48′7″E
- Country: Poland
- Voivodeship: Świętokrzyskie
- County: Kielce
- Gmina: Chmielnik
- Population: 590

Łagiewniki [waɡʲɛvˈniki] is a village in the administrative district of Gmina Chmielnik, within Kielce County, Świętokrzyskie Voivodeship, in south-central Poland. It lies approximately 4 km (2 mi) east of Chmielnik and 32 km (20 mi) south-east of the regional capital Kielce.
