= Holendry, Gmina Chmielnik =

Holendry
- Village
- Location within Poland
- Coordinates: 50°36′5″N 20°41′21″E
- Country: Poland
- Voivodeship: Świętokrzyskie
- County: Kielce
- Gmina: Chmielnik
- Population: 110

Holendry [xɔˈlɛndrɨ] is a village in the administrative district of Gmina Chmielnik, within Kielce County, Świętokrzyskie Voivodeship, in south-central Poland. It lies approximately 5 km (3 mi) west of Chmielnik and 32 km (20 mi) south of the regional capital Kielce.
