= Piotrkowice, Kielce County =

Piotrkowice
- Village
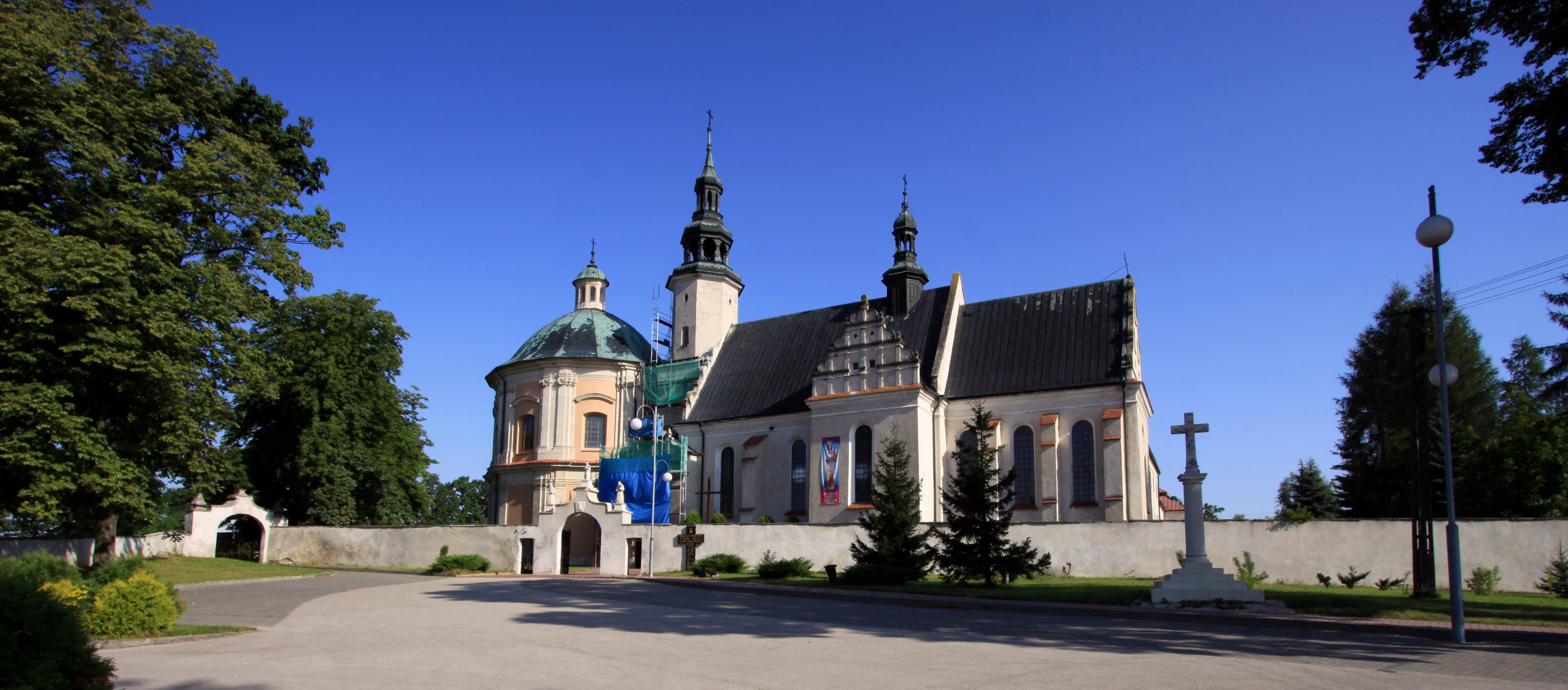
- Sanctuary of Our Lady of Loretto

- Coat of arms

- Location within Poland
- Coordinates: 50°40′7″N 20°40′17″E
- Country: Poland
- Voivodeship: Świętokrzyskie
- County: Kielce
- Gmina: Chmielnik
- Highest elevation: 300 m (980 ft)
- Lowest elevation: 280 m (920 ft)
- Population (approx.): 480

Piotrkowice [pjɔtrkɔˈvit͡sɛ] is a village in the administrative district of Gmina Chmielnik, within Kielce County, Świętokrzyskie Voivodeship, in south-central Poland. It lies approximately 9 km (6 mi) north-west of Chmielnik and 25 km (16 mi) south of the regional capital Kielce.

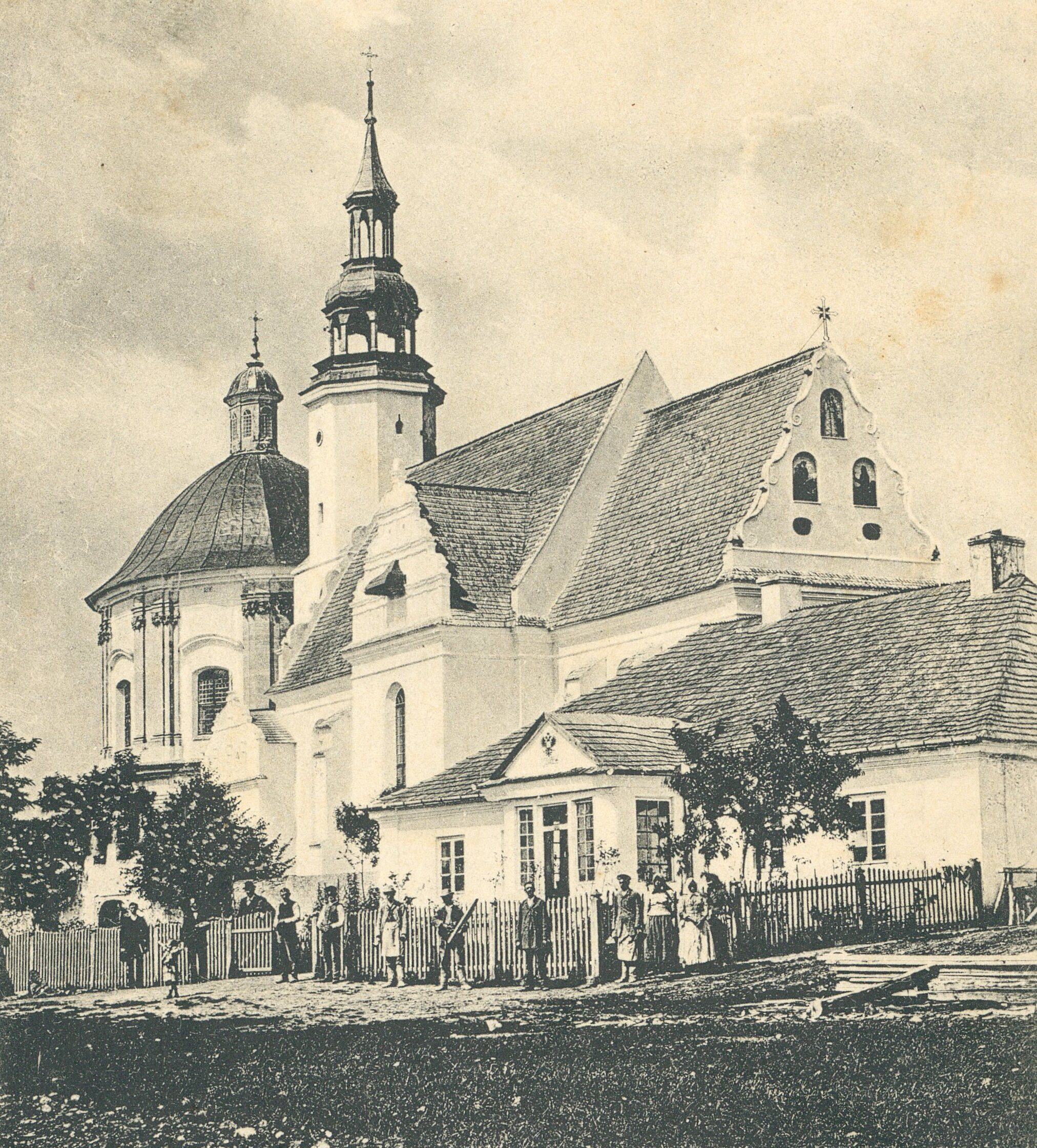
Church before 1906
