= Lugi (disambiguation) =

The Lugi were a people of northern Scotland c. 150 AD.

Lugi may also refer to:

- Lugii, a people of southern Poland ca. 100 BC–300 AD
- Ługi (disambiguation), various settlements in Poland
- Lugi HF, a handball team in Lund, Sweden
- Lugi Rugbyklubb, a rugby union club in Lund, Sweden
