= Raynov =

Raynov (Bulgarian: Райнов), or Raynova (Bulgarian: Райнова), is a surname of Bulgarian origin. Notable people with this surname include:

- Bogomil Raynov (1919–2007), Bulgarian writer
- Martin Raynov (born 1992), Bulgarian footballer
- Yvanka B. Raynova (born 1959), Bulgarian philosopher
