= Sukhovolia =

Sukhovolia (Ukrainian: Суховоля) may refer several places in Ukraine:

- Sukhovolia, Chervonohrad Raion, Lviv Oblast, village in Chervonohrad Raion
- Sukhovolia, Lviv Raion, Lviv Oblast, village in Lviv Raion
- Sukhovolia, Zolochiv Raion, Lviv Oblast, village in Zolochiv Raion
- Sukhovolia, Rivne Oblast, village in Varash Raion
- Sukhovolia, Volyn Oblast, village in Lutsk Raion
- Sukhovolia, Zviahel Raion, Zhytomyr Oblast, village in Zviahel Raion
- Sukhovolia, Zhytomyr Raion, Zhytomyr Oblast, village in Zhytomyr Raion

== See also ==
- Suchowola (disambiguation)
