= Stanisław Wyspiański Memorial =

Monument in Warsaw, Poland

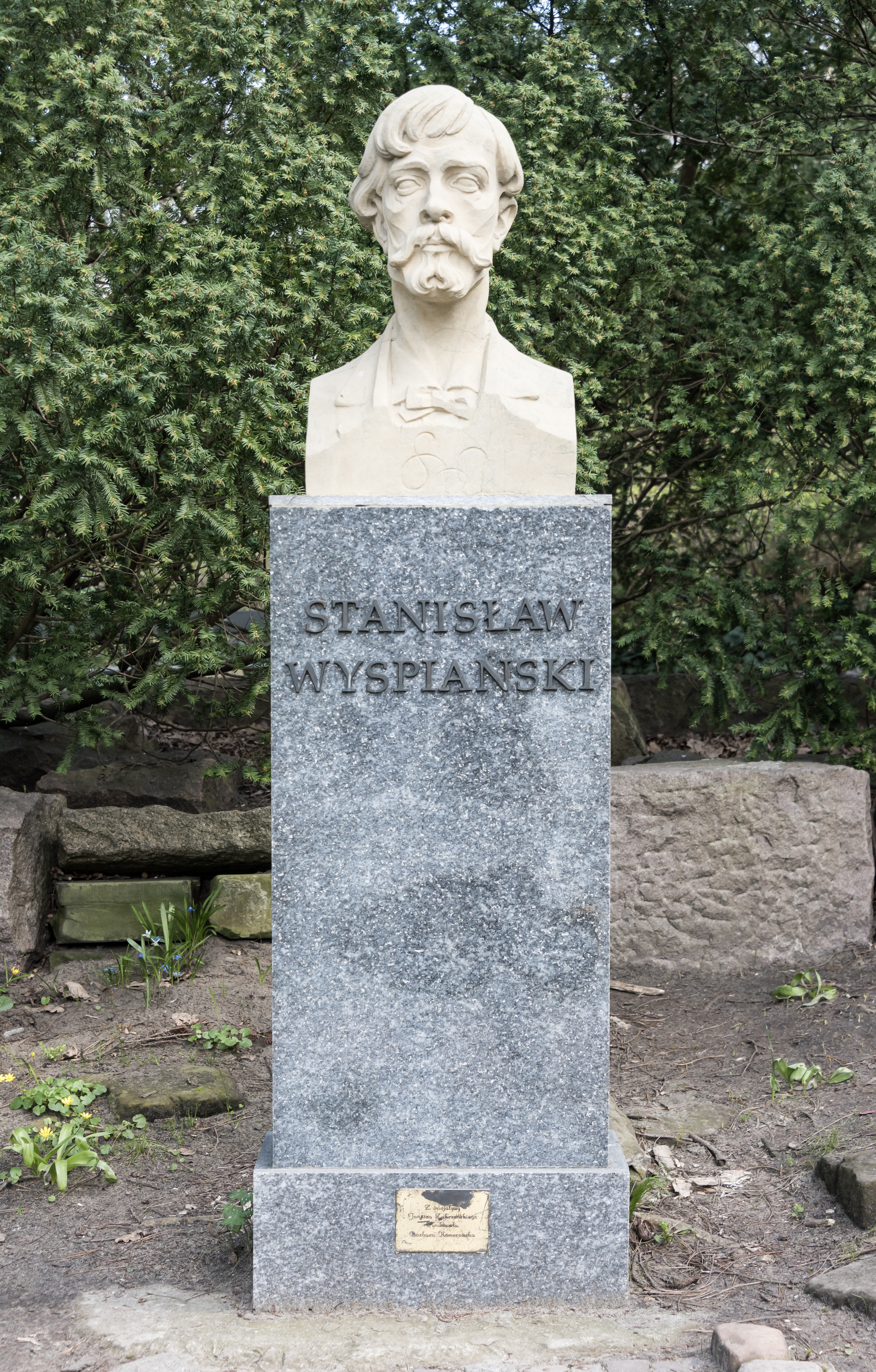
- The sculpture in 2023
- Interactive map of Stanisław Wyspiański Memorial
- Location: Royal Baths Park, Downtown, Warsaw, Poland
- Coordinates: 52°12′47.5″N 21°02′12.5″E
- Designer: Apolinary Głowiński
- Type: Bust
- Material: Gypsum
- Opening date: 2004
- Dedicated to: Stanisław Wyspiański

The Stanisław Wyspiański Memorial (Polish: Pomnik Stanisława Wyspiańskiego), also known as the bust of Stanisław Wyspiański (Polish: Popiersie Stanisława Wyspiańskiego), is a gypsum bust sculpture in Warsaw, Poland, placed in the Royal Baths Park, within the neighbourhood of Ujazdów, in the Downtown district. It is dedicated to Stanisław Wyspiański, a 19th-century playwright, painter and poet, who, created a series of symbolic, national dramas within the artistic philosophy of the Young Poland movement. The monument is a replica of a 1928 wooden sculpture by Apolinary Głowiński, and was unveiled in 2004.

== History ==
The sculpture is a replica of a wooden bust by Apolinary Głowiński from 1928, for which, he was awarded a medal for best portrait at the Charity Salon of the Zachęta National Gallery of Art. Głowiński based it on Wyspiański's self-portraits, while keeping it in the style of Art Nouveau movement. It was proposed by actor Janusz Zakrzeński, and unveiled in 2004.

== Design ==
The monument includes a gypsum bust of Stanisław Wyspiański, made in the Art Nouveau style, with characteristic to it sculpture of hair and facial features. On the chrst is engraved Wyspiański's signature is engraved on the chest, in form of his initials S. W. It is placed on a stone pedestal with a square base, and inscription which reads: Stanisław Wyspiański. The monument is located in the Royal Baths Park, in an alley to the north of the Royal Baths Amphitrite, and next to the Lower South Pond.
