= Lubania, Świętokrzyskie Voivodeship =

Lubania
- Village
- Location within Poland
- Coordinates: 50°37′43″N 20°46′47″E
- Country: Poland
- Voivodeship: Świętokrzyskie
- County: Kielce
- Gmina: Chmielnik
- Population: 260

Lubania [luˈbaɲa] is a village in the administrative district of Gmina Chmielnik, within Kielce County, Świętokrzyskie Voivodeship, in south-central Poland. It lies approximately 3 km (2 mi) north-east of Chmielnik and 31 km (19 mi) south of the regional capital Kielce.
