= Ciecierze =

- Village
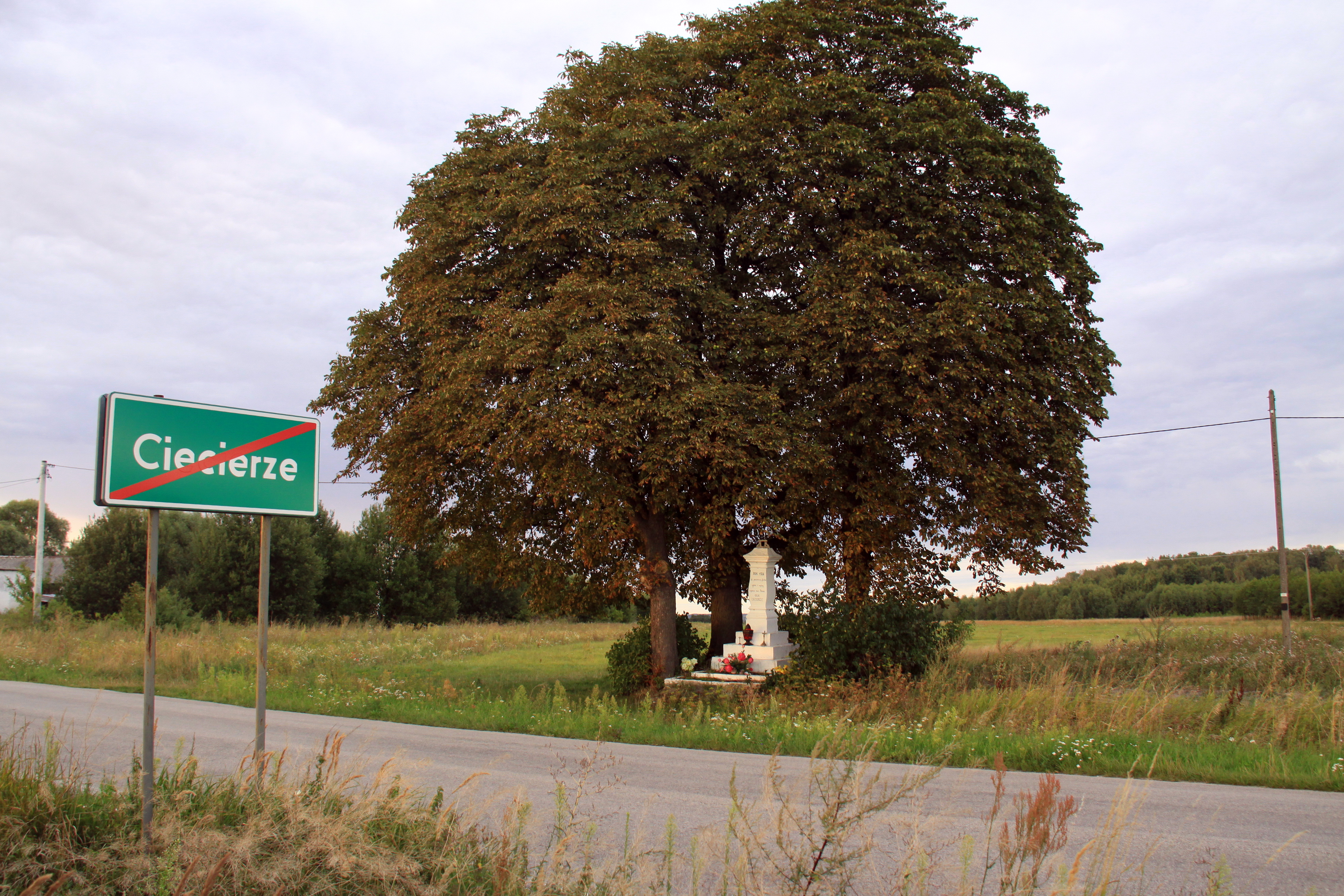

- Location within Poland
- Coordinates: 50°35′33″N 20°45′54″E
- Country: Poland
- Voivodeship: Świętokrzyskie
- County: Kielce
- Gmina: Chmielnik
- Population: 80

Ciecierze [t͡ɕɛˈt͡ɕɛʐɛ] is a village in the administrative district of Gmina Chmielnik, within Kielce County, Świętokrzyskie Voivodeship, in south-central Poland. It lies approximately 3 km (2 mi) south-east of Chmielnik and 34 km (21 mi) south of the regional capital Kielce.
