= Synagogue in Chmielnik =

Historical synagogue in Poland

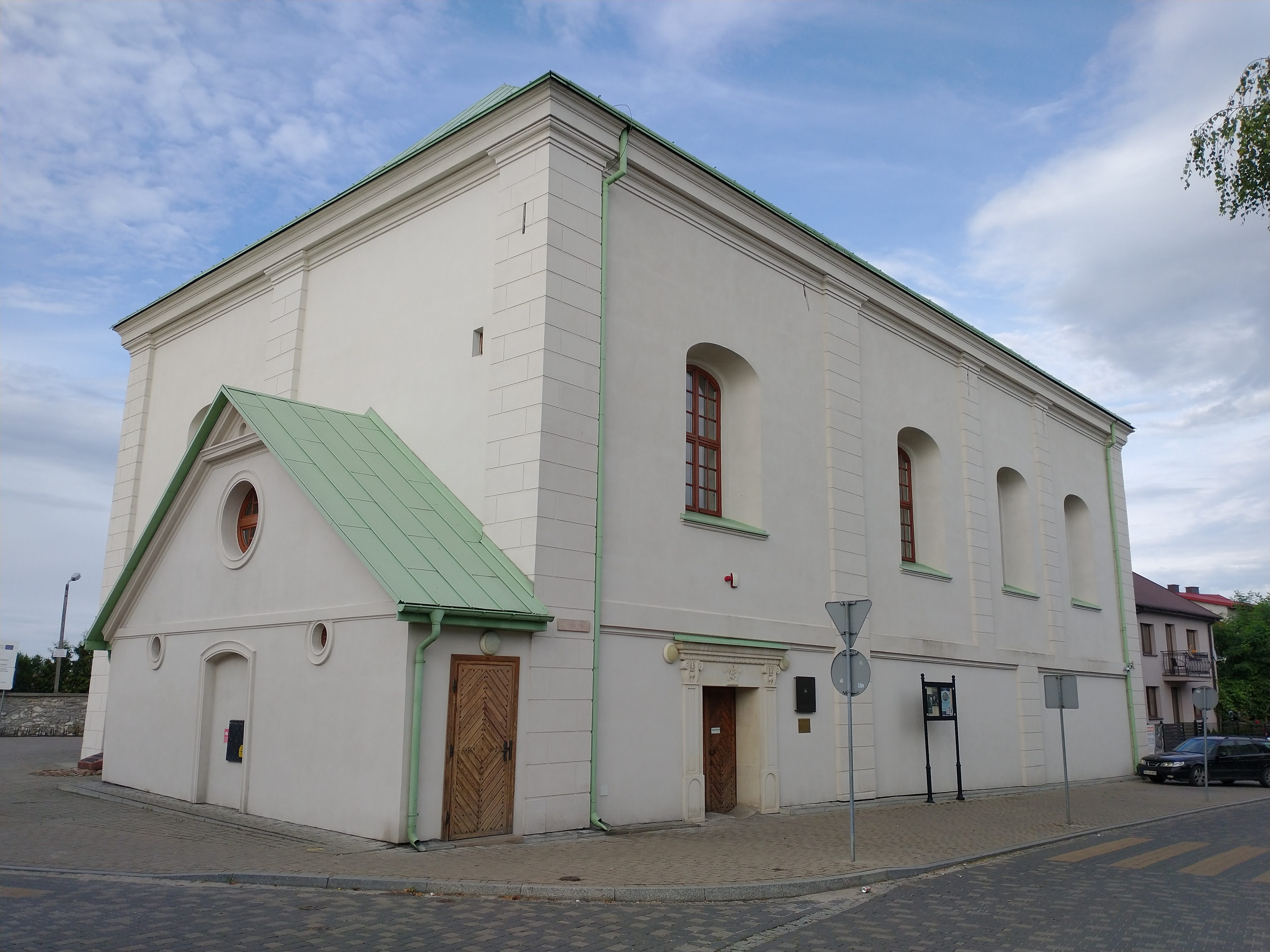
- Synagogue after renovation (2014)

- Location within Świętokrzyskie Voivodeship Location within Poland

Religion
- Affiliation: Orthodox Judaism
- Status: Educational and Museum Centre “Świętokrzyski Sztetl”

Location
- Location: Chmielnik, Świętokrzyskie Voivodeship, Poland
- Country: Poland
- Interactive map of Synagogue in Chmielnik
- Coordinates: 50.6155°N 20.7518°E

Architecture
- Type: Synagogue
- Completed: 18th century

The Synagogue in Chmielnik is a historic synagogue located in Chmielnik, Świętokrzyskie Voivodeship, Poland at Wspólna Street no. 14 , approximately 300 meters north of the town square.

== History ==
The synagogue was originally built in the 18th century. On 18 April 1630, the town owner Krzysztof Gołuchowski granted Jewish residents a charter:

...granting unto the said Old-Law adherents leave to dwell therein, to establish diverse trades, vineyards, taverns and buildings, and at length to erect a synagogue and schools upon the plots.

After a major fire in 1876, the building was rebuilt; the roof form, façade articulation, and interior decoration were altered. During World War II, in 1942, German occupying forces devastated the interior and converted the synagogue into a warehouse. At that time a wooden ceiling was installed in the main prayer hall and the women’s gallery balustrade was dismantled. After the war, the building continued to be used as a grain warehouse.

== Renovation and present use ==
In 2008 a decision was made to restore the synagogue. The project was designed by Nizio Design International. The restored building now functions as the interactive Educational and Museum Centre “Świętokrzyski Shtetl”, presenting several centuries of Jewish history in Chmielnik and the life of a typical pre-war shtetl.

The concept is based on two contrasting volumes:

- a metal cube inside the synagogue symbolising light — coexistence of Poles and Jews before the war, with a rooftop stage used for concerts, theatre and exhibitions;
- an external structure known as the House of Shadow, symbolising the Holocaust.

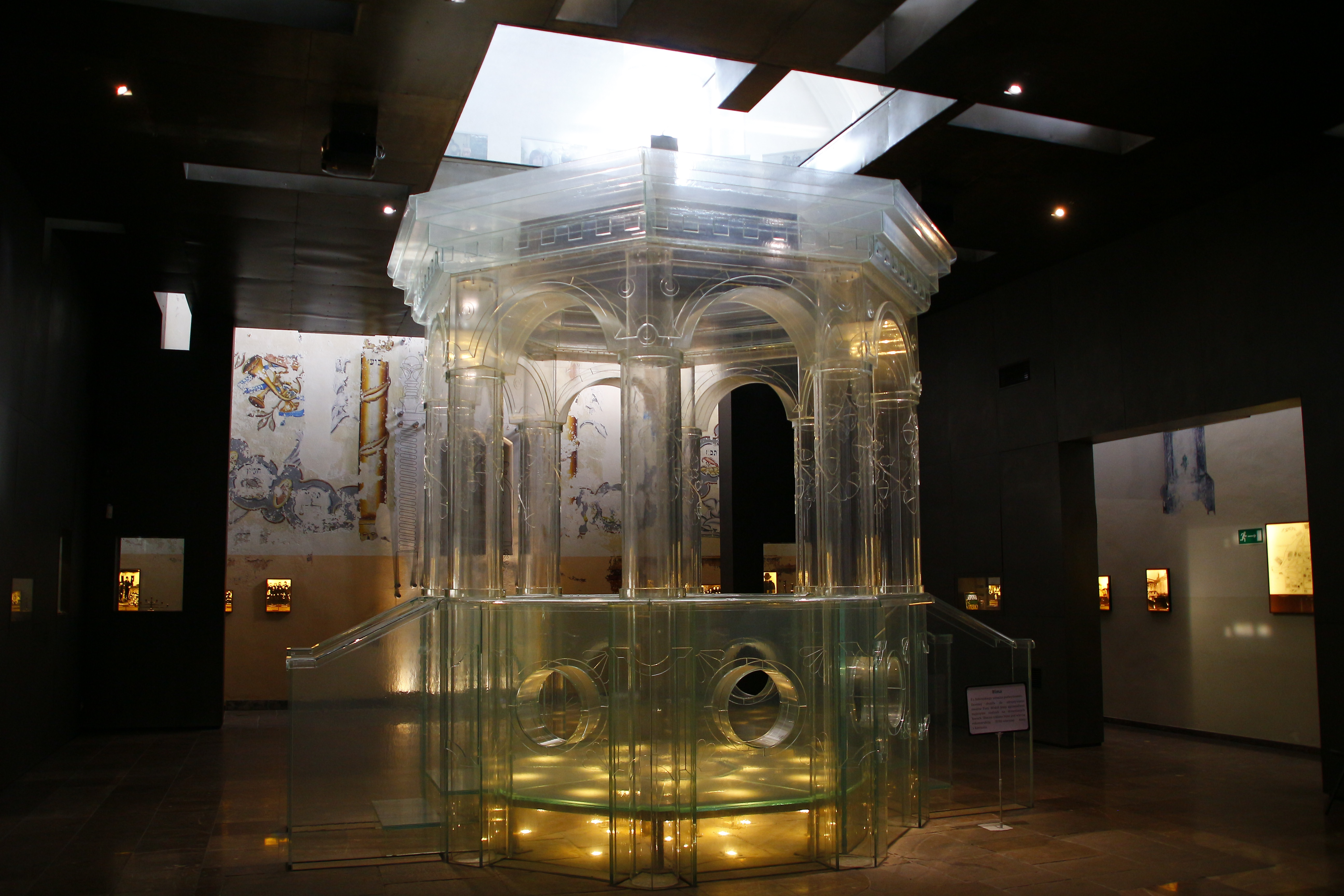
Glass bimah reconstructed in the main prayer hall.

In the former prayer hall, an 18th-century glass bimah was reconstructed, recalling the pre-war arrangement of the interior.

The total cost of the project and surrounding site development was approximately 7 million PLN, of which 4 million PLN came from the Regional Operational Programme 2007–2013. Since January 2014 the centre has been open to visitors as an interactive museum.

== Architecture ==
The masonry building, constructed of stone and brick, is oriented east–west and stands on a rectangular plan with internal dimensions of approximately 15.0 × 29.5 metres. The main prayer hall is set several steps below ground level. To the west it was preceded by a vestibule and a room of the kahal (Jewish communal authority). Above them ran a women’s gallery open to the main hall, accessed by two external wooden staircases from the west.

The whole structure is covered by a hipped roof. The single, rectangular prayer hall is topped by a four-part vault with geometric stucco decoration: three bays over the hall and a wider fourth bay over the gallery. Although most of the original furnishings were destroyed during World War II, Baroque capitals and fragments of stucco survive.

The Holy Ark was set in a niche on the eastern wall within a stucco frame. A free-standing octagonal stone bimah, richly decorated in the form of a pavilion, stood in the centre of the hall.

== Heritage status ==
The synagogue is entered in the register of historic monuments of the Świętokrzyskie Voivodeship as:

- No. A.275 of 8 February 1958 and 21 February 1966 — “Synagogue, Wspólna Street 14, Chmielnik (built 1630; devastated 1942).”
