= Gmina Chmielnik, Świętokrzyskie Voivodeship =

Gmina Chmielnik Chmielnik Commune
- Gmina
- Coat of arms

- Location within Poland Location within Europe
- Coordinates (Chmielnik): 50°36′42″N 20°44′59″E
- Country: Poland
- Voivodeship: Świętokrzyskie
- County: Kielce County
- Seat: Chmielnik

Area
  - Total: 142.87 km^{2} (55.16 sq mi)

Population (2006)
  - Total: 11,568
  - Density: 80.969/km^{2} (209.71/sq mi)
  - Urban: 4,005
  - Rural: 7,563
- Website: http://www.chmielnik.com

Gmina Chmielnik is an urban-rural gmina (administrative district) in Kielce County, Świętokrzyskie Voivodeship, in south-central Poland. Its seat is the town of Chmielnik, which lies approximately 32 kilometres (20 mi) south of the regional capital Kielce.

The gmina covers an area of 142.87 square kilometres (55.2 sq mi), and as of 2006 its total population is 11,568 (out of which the population of Chmielnik amounts to 4,005, and the population of the rural part of the gmina is 7,563).

The gmina contains parts of the protected areas called Nida Landscape Park and Szaniec Landscape Park.

== Villages ==
Apart from the town of Chmielnik, Gmina Chmielnik contains the villages and settlements of Borzykowa, Celiny, Chomentówek, Ciecierze, Grabowiec, Holendry, Jasień, Kotlice, Łagiewniki, Lipy, Lubania, Ługi, Minostowice, Piotrkowice, Przededworze, Sędziejowice, Śladków Duży, Śladków Mały, Suchowola, Suliszów, Suskrajowice, Szyszczyce, Zrecze Chałupczańskie, Zrecze Duże and Zrecze Małe.

== Neighbouring gminas ==
Gmina Chmielnik is bordered by the gminas of Busko-Zdrój, Gnojno, Kije, Morawica, Pierzchnica and Pińczów.
