= Suchowola, Kielce County =

Suchowola
- Village
- Location within Poland
- Coordinates: 50°37′56″N 20°44′51″E
- Country: Poland
- Voivodeship: Świętokrzyskie
- County: Kielce
- Gmina: Chmielnik
- Population: 520

Suchowola [suxɔˈvɔla] is a village in the administrative district of Gmina Chmielnik, within Kielce County, Świętokrzyskie Voivodeship, in south-central Poland. It lies approximately 3 km (2 mi) north of Chmielnik and 30 km (19 mi) south of the regional capital Kielce.
