= Przededworze =

- Village
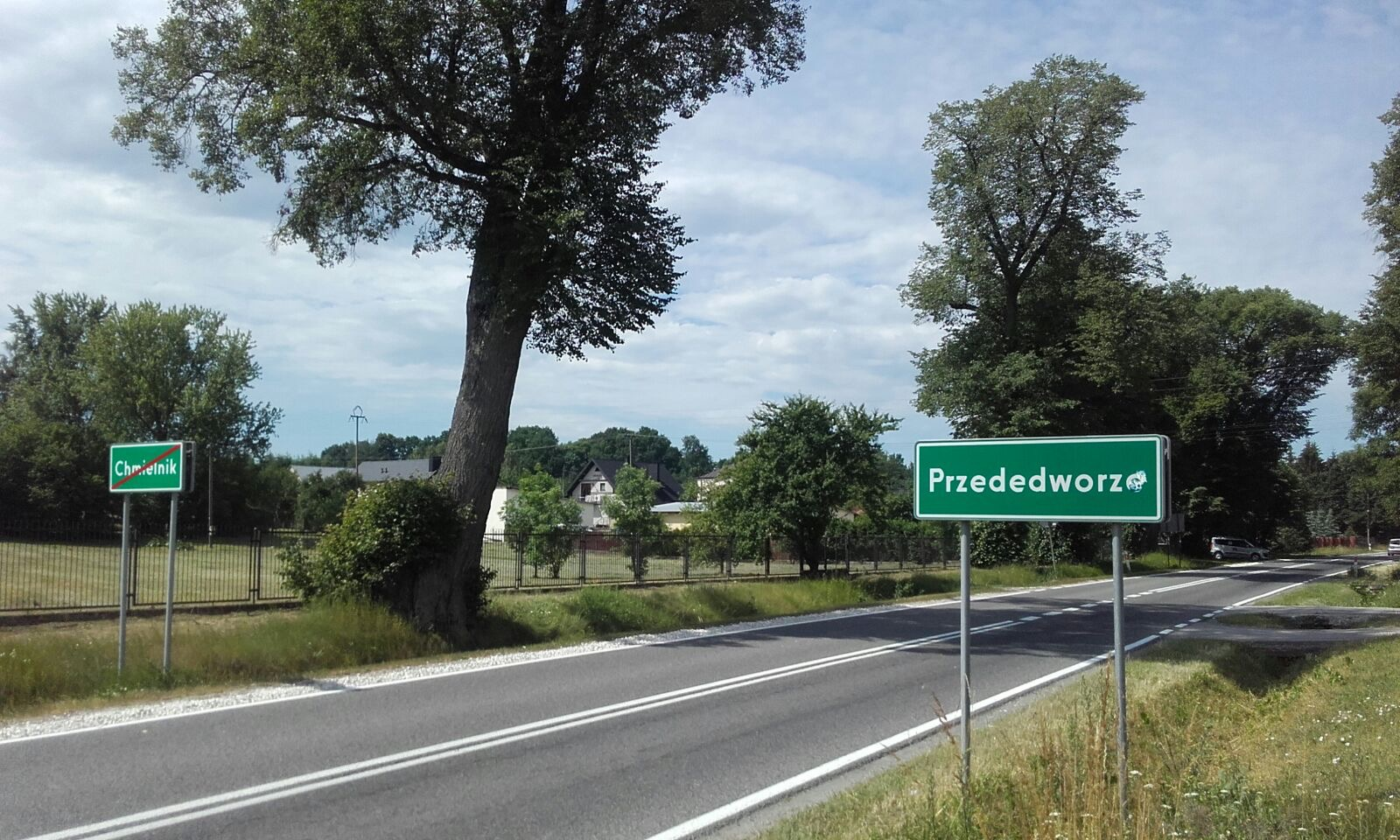

- Location within Poland
- Coordinates: 50°36′39″N 20°43′37″E
- Country: Poland
- Voivodeship: Świętokrzyskie
- County: Kielce
- Gmina: Chmielnik
- Population: 726

Przededworze [pʂɛdɛdˈvɔʐɛ] is a village in the administrative district of Gmina Chmielnik, within Kielce County, Świętokrzyskie Voivodeship, in south-central Poland. It lies approximately 2 km (1 mi) west of Chmielnik and 32 km (20 mi) south of the regional capital Kielce.
