= Suchowola (disambiguation) =

Suchowola may refer to the following places:

- Suchowola, Łódź Voivodeship (central Poland)
- Suchowola, Radzyń County in Lublin Voivodeship (east Poland)
- Suchowola in Podlaskie Voivodeship (north-east Poland)
- Suchowola, Zamość County in Lublin Voivodeship (east Poland)
- Suchowola, Busko County in Świętokrzyskie Voivodeship (south-central Poland)
- Suchowola, Kielce County in Świętokrzyskie Voivodeship (south-central Poland)
- Suchowola, Staszów County in Świętokrzyskie Voivodeship (south-central Poland)
