= Melchior Buliński =

Polish priest and historian

Very Reverend Melchior Buliński
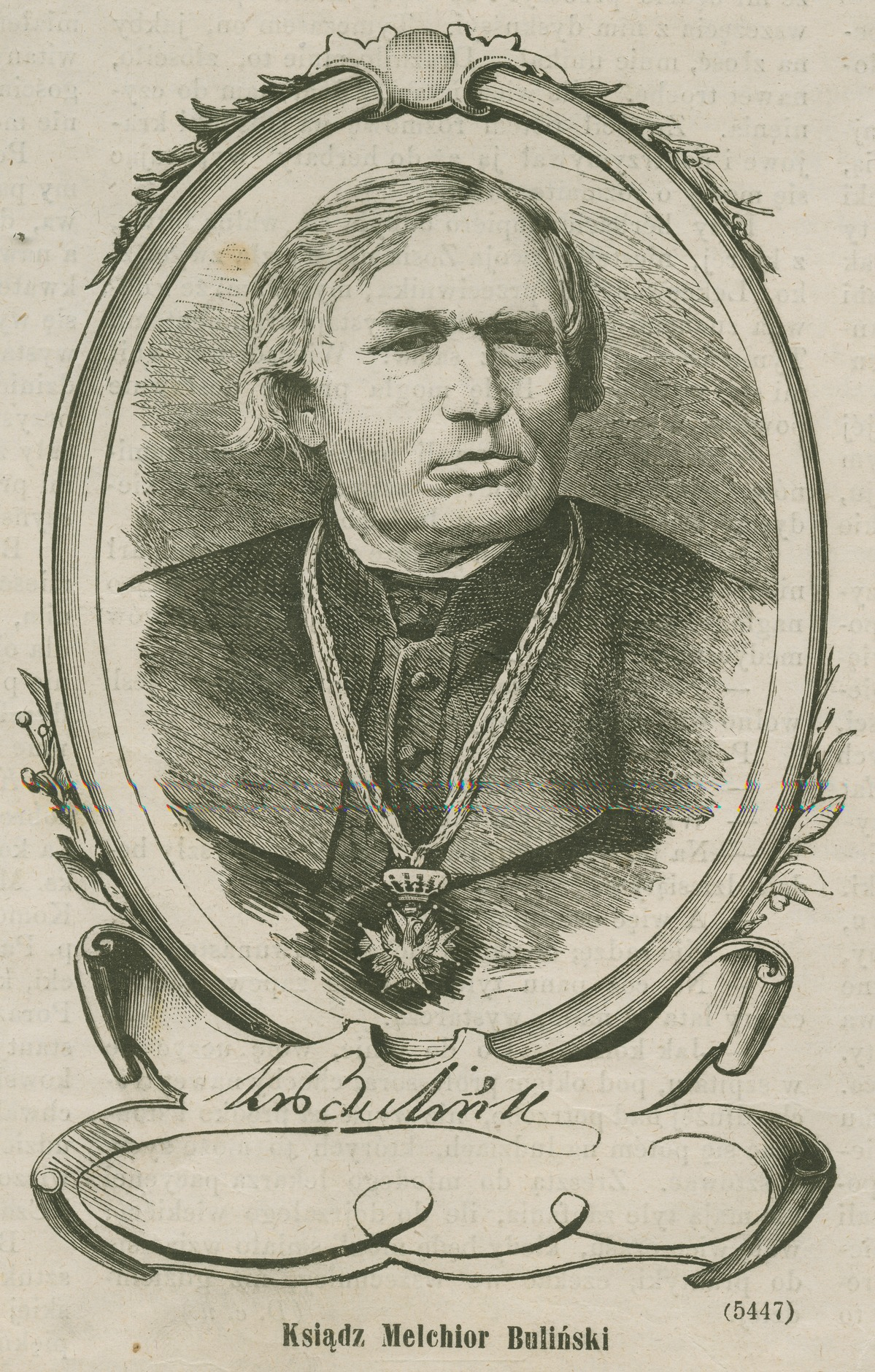

Personal details
- Born: 1810 Chmielnik, Duchy of Warsaw
- Died: 22 May 1877 (aged 66–67) Sandomierz
- Occupation: Priest, professor
- Education: Cand. theol.
- Alma mater: Theological Academy in Warsaw

Melchior Buliński (1810–1877) was a Polish priest and historian. He is known for his works about the history of the Catholic Church in Poland.

== Biography ==
Buliński was born in Chmielnik in 1810. His father was an impoverished worker at the church in Chmielnik, and Buliński had to rely on the assistance of the parish priest in order to acquire an education. He received his education at seminaries in Sandomierz and Warsaw. He then lectured on church history, first as a professor in Sandomierz, and then at the Theological Academy in Warsaw until its closure in 1867. He became a canon of Sandomierz in 1859.

Buliński died on 22 May 1877 in Sandomierz. His monograph on the city of Sandomierz was published posthumously. His biography is also in the Polish Biographical Dictionary.

== Works ==
=== Books ===
- (1860) Historya kościoła powszechnego
- (1874) Historya kościoła Polskiego
- (1879) Monografija miasta Sandomierza

== Gallery ==
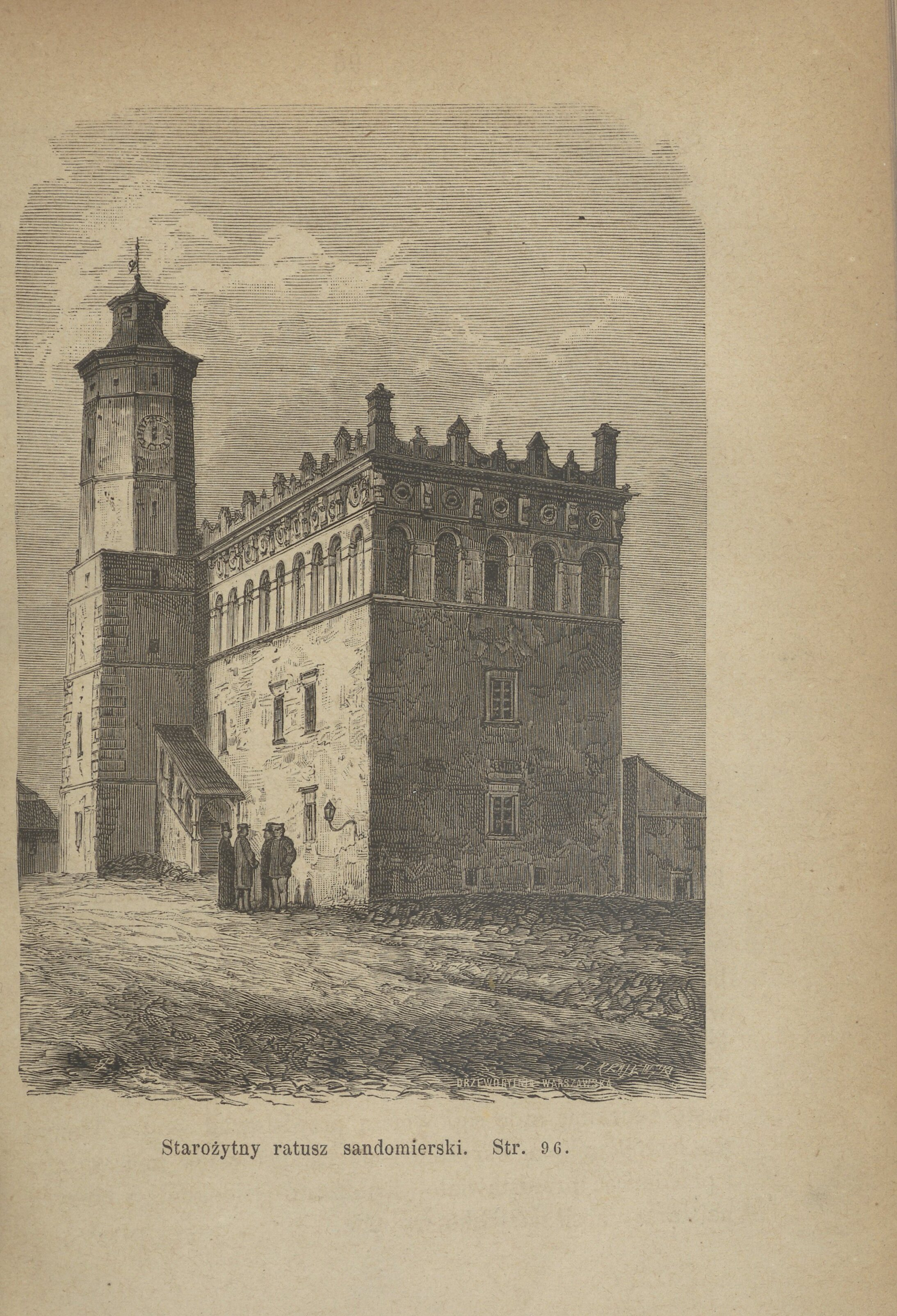
Sandomierz Town Hall, Monografija miasta Sandomierza

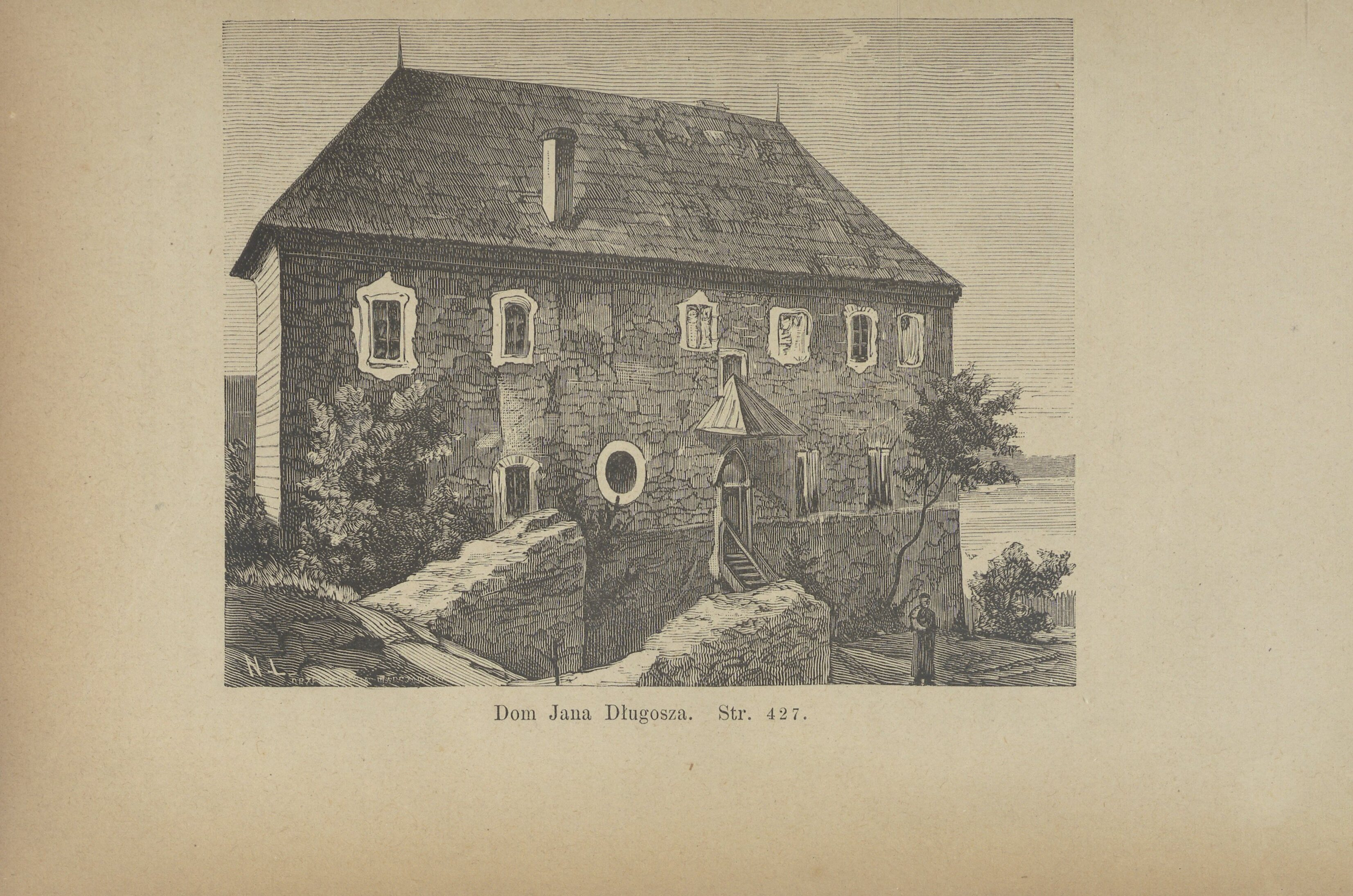
Długosz House, Monografija miasta Sandomierza

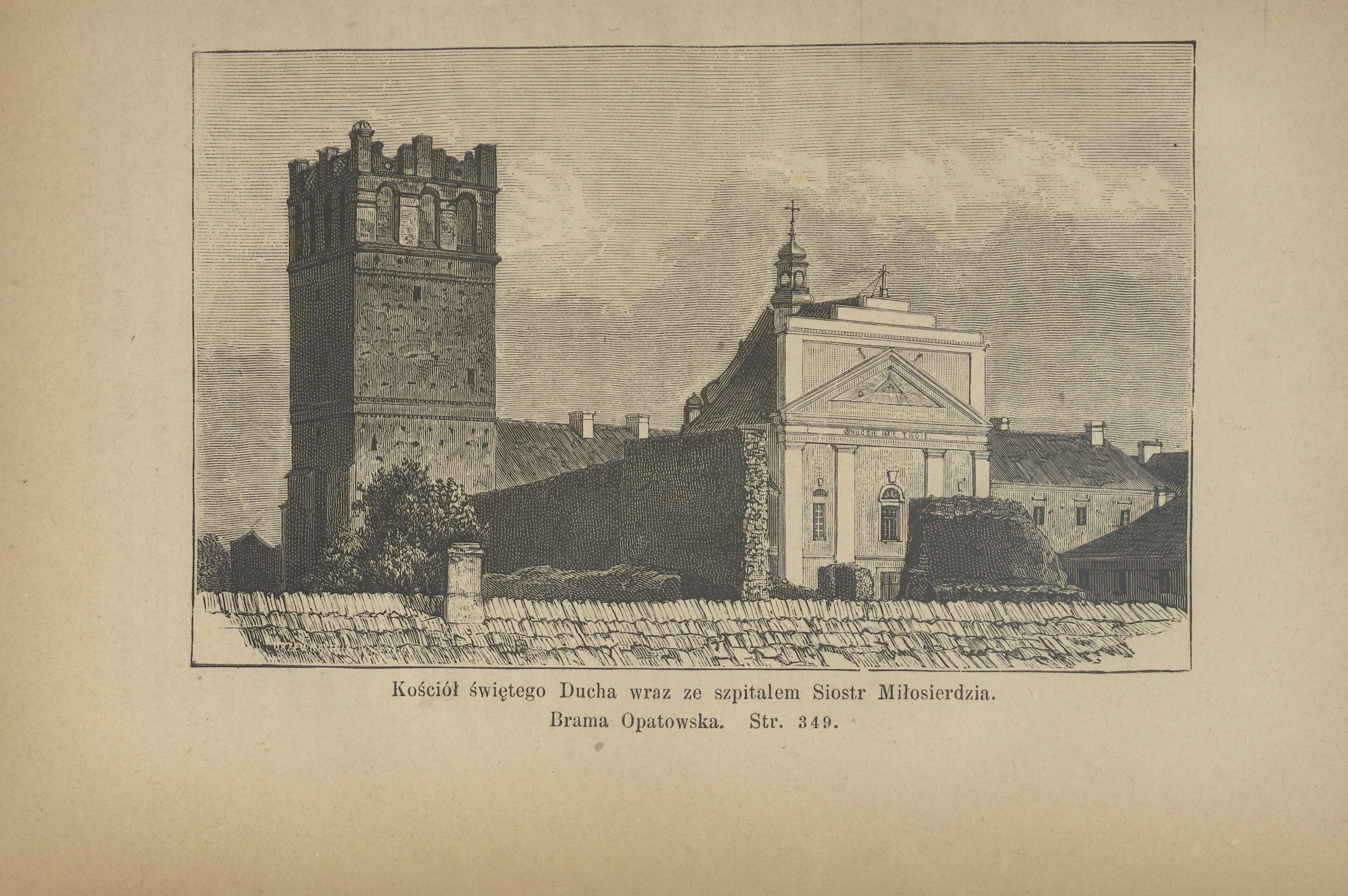
Opatow Gate, Monografija miasta Sandomierza

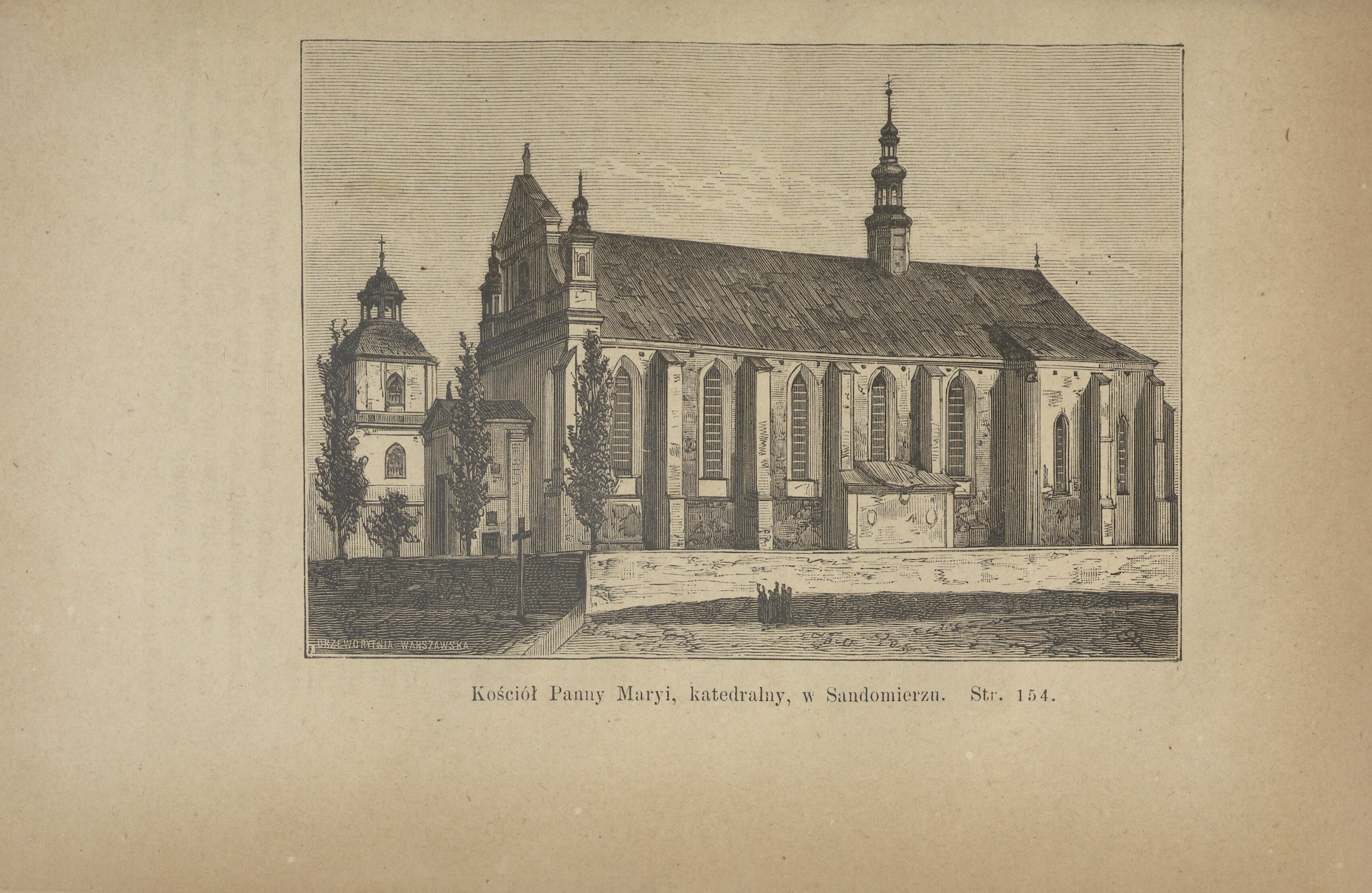
Sandomierz Cathedral, Monografija miasta Sandomierza
