= Śladków Duży =

- Village
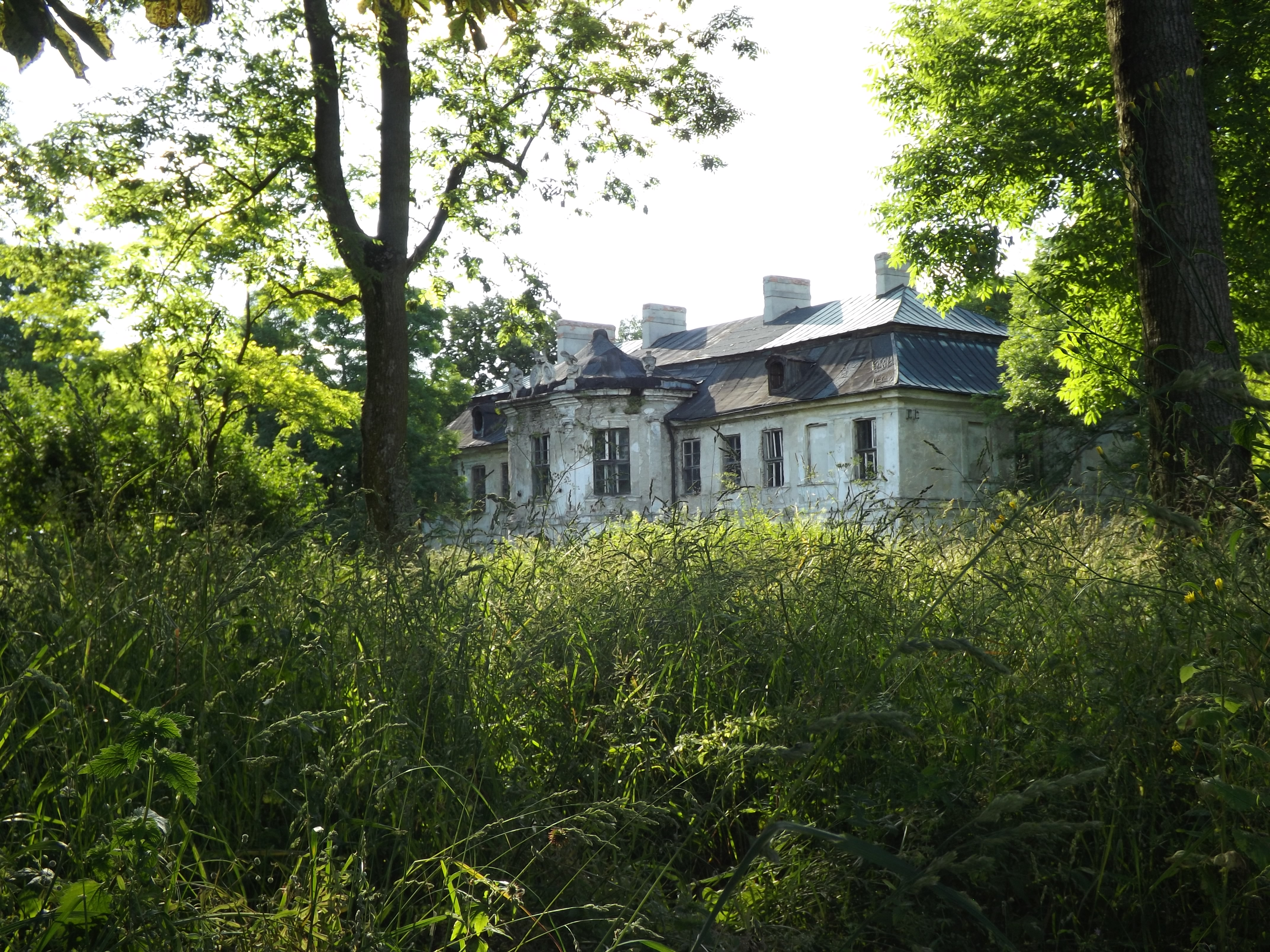
- Palace

- Location within Poland
- Coordinates: 50°34′49″N 20°42′23″E
- Country: Poland
- Voivodeship: Świętokrzyskie
- County: Kielce
- Gmina: Chmielnik
- Population: 450

Śladków Duży [ˈɕlatkuf ˈduʐɨ] is a village in the administrative district of Gmina Chmielnik, within Kielce County, Świętokrzyskie Voivodeship, in south-central Poland. It lies approximately 5 km (3 mi) south-west of Chmielnik and 35 km (22 mi) south of the regional capital Kielce.
