= Suliszów, Kielce County =

Suliszów
- Village
- Location within Poland
- Coordinates: 50°38′44″N 20°40′13″E
- Country: Poland
- Voivodeship: Świętokrzyskie
- County: Kielce
- Gmina: Chmielnik
- Population: 180

Suliszów [suˈliʂuf] is a village in the administrative district of Gmina Chmielnik, within Kielce County, Świętokrzyskie Voivodeship, in south-central Poland. It lies approximately 7 km (4 mi) north-west of Chmielnik and 27 km (17 mi) south of the regional capital Kielce.
