= Ługi, Kielce County =

Ługi
- Village
- Location within Poland
- Coordinates: 50°39′17″N 20°43′50″E
- Country: Poland
- Voivodeship: Świętokrzyskie
- County: Kielce
- Gmina: Chmielnik
- Population: 200

Ługi [ˈwuɡi] is a village in the administrative district of Gmina Chmielnik, within Kielce County, Świętokrzyskie Voivodeship, in south-central Poland. It lies approximately 5 km (3 mi) north of Chmielnik and 27 km (17 mi) south of the regional capital Kielce.
