= Śladków Mały =

- Village
- Location within Poland
- Coordinates: 50°34′45″N 20°44′35″E
- Country: Poland
- Voivodeship: Świętokrzyskie
- County: Kielce
- Gmina: Chmielnik
- Population: 460

Śladków Mały [ˈɕlatkuf ˈmawɨ] is a village in the administrative district of Gmina Chmielnik, within Kielce County, Świętokrzyskie Voivodeship, in south-central Poland. It lies approximately 4 km (2 mi) south of Chmielnik and 35 km (22 mi) south of the regional capital Kielce.
