= Lipy, Świętokrzyskie Voivodeship =

Lipy
- Village
- Location within Poland
- Coordinates: 50°37′56″N 20°46′04″E
- Country: Poland
- Voivodeship: Świętokrzyskie
- County: Kielce
- Gmina: Chmielnik

Lipy [ˈlipɨ] is a village in the administrative district of Gmina Chmielnik, within Kielce County, Świętokrzyskie Voivodeship, in south-central Poland.
