= Ługi =

Ługi may refer to:

- Ługi, Lower Silesian Voivodeship (south-west Poland)
- Ługi, Sieradz County in Łódź Voivodeship (central Poland)
- Ługi, Zgierz County in Łódź Voivodeship (central Poland)
- Ługi, Kielce County in Świętokrzyskie Voivodeship (south-central Poland)
- Ługi, Opatów County in Świętokrzyskie Voivodeship (south-central Poland)
- Ługi, Mława County in Masovian Voivodeship (east-central Poland)
- Ługi, Zwoleń County in Masovian Voivodeship (east-central Poland)
- Ługi, Słupca County in Greater Poland Voivodeship (west-central Poland)
- Ługi, Śrem County in Greater Poland Voivodeship (west-central Poland)
- Ługi, Złotów County in Greater Poland Voivodeship (west-central Poland)
- Ługi, Nowa Sól County in Lubusz Voivodeship (west Poland)
- Ługi, Strzelce-Drezdenko County in Lubusz Voivodeship (west Poland)
- Ługi, Pomeranian Voivodeship (north Poland)
