= Yvanka B. Raynova =

Bulgarian philosopher

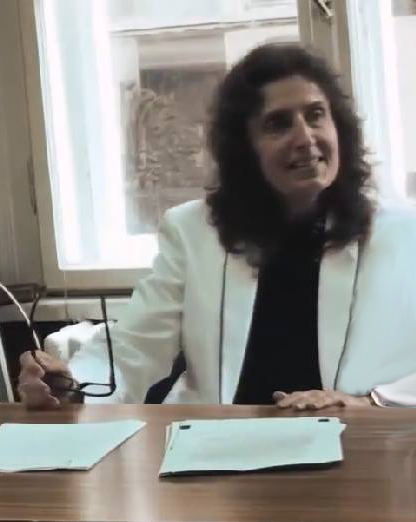
- Yvanka B. Raynova in 2014
- Born: Yvanka B. Raynova; 16 October 1959 (age 66); Sofia, Bulgaria

Philosophical work
- Era: Contemporary philosophy
- Region: Western Philosophy
- School: Phenomenology, Hermeneutics
- Institutions: Sorbonne, Sofia University, Bulgarian Academy of Sciences
- Main interests: Contemporary philosophy, value philosophy, gender studies, religious studies, intercultural philosophy

Yvanka B. Raynova (Bulgarian: Иванка Б. Райнова; born 16 October 1959) is a Bulgarian philosopher, feminist, editor, translator, and publisher. She is full professor of contemporary philosophy at the Institute of Philosophy and Sociology at the Bulgarian Academy of Sciences and director of the Institute for Axiological Research in Vienna. She elaborated a post-personalist hermeneutic phenomenology based on some gnostic ideas. Her works include studies on continental philosophy, phenomenology, hermeneutics, axiology (value theory), feminist philosophy, intercultural philosophy, religious studies, and translation studies.

== Education and career ==
Raynova studied Germanic Languages and Literature at the Sorbonne and Philosophy at Humboldt University and Sofia University, where she earned in 1984 her master's degrees in Philosophy and in French Studies. From 1984 to 1989 she was assistant professor in French Studies in charge of the Philosophy Translation Program at the Department of Foreign Languages of Sofia University. In 1989 she earned a Ph.D. in philosophy from the Institute of Philosophy at the Bulgarian Academy of Sciences, where she became Junior research fellow. The same year she founded the Bulgarian Society for French Philosophy and Culture – Société Bulgare de Philosophie et de Culture de Langue Française.

After her habilitation in 1996, she was appointed senior research fellow and became Chair of the Department for Contemporary European Philosophy and Gender Studies and head of the Bulgarian Phenomenological Center. She was scientific secretary of the Institute of Philosophy from 1995 to 1997. In addition to her Phenomenology courses at Sofia University, she set up in 1995 a seminar and invited lecturer program on "Phenomenology and Post-Phenomenology" of the Institute of Philosophy, and organized in 2004 the first International Conference on Phenomenology and Hermeneutics at Goethe Institut – Sofia. After fellowships at Vienna University and the Austrian Academy of Sciences, she became in 1999 co-founder and director of the Institut für Axiologische Forschungen (Institute of Axiological Research). In 2006 she received a second doctoral title – Dr. phil. – from Vienna University. Since 2009 she has participated in the Austrian academic program "University meets Public", teaching philosophy courses in different high schools in Vienna. In 2013 she earned the highest doctoral degree – D.Sc., Doctor of Sciences in Philosophy – from the newly founded Institute for the Study of Societies and Knowledge of the Bulgarian Academy of Sciences, where she was appointed full professor.

== Work ==
Translations and editorial activities

The early writings and research of Raynova had a special impact on Bulgarian philosophy and culture, as she was the first to introduce contemporary French and German philosophers, unknown at the time in the Bulgarian academia, like Simone Weil, Simone de Beauvoir, Edith Stein, Maurice Merleau-Ponty and Paul Ricoeur, and to translate original texts of these and other authors into Bulgarian. Among her most important translations into Bulgarian are Jean-Paul Sartre's Being and Nothingness and Paul Ricoeur's The Conflict of Interpretations. She was also the first to open the field of Feminist philosophy in Bulgaria by publishing an extensive essay on Simone de Beauvoir in 1988 and organizing ten years later the first conference on Feminist philosophy in Sofia in which took part well known Western feminists like Alison Jaggar, Herta Nagl-Docekal, Cornelia Klinger, Hedwig Meyer-Wilmes a.o.

After the fall of Communism she became chief editor of the book series "Philosophers of the 20th Century" at the publisher "Nauka I Izkustvo", and "Contemporary Philosophers" at EA, where she compiled the translation programs and edited herself some key figures of Western philosophy, including Jean-Paul Sartre, Hans-Georg Gadamer, Paul Ricoeur, Jacques Derrida, Jean Baudrillard, Jean-Francois Lyotard, Simone de Beauvoir, Richard Rorty a. o.

After the foundation of the Institute for Axiological Research in Vienna in 1999, Raynova became chief editor of its book series and journals, including the Peter Lang series "Philosophie, Phänomenologie und Hermeneutik der Werte" ("Philosophy, Phenomenology and Value Hermeneutics") and Labyrinth: An International Journal of Philosophy, Value Theory and Sociocultural Hermeneutics, as well as program director of Axia Academic Publishers.

Post-personalism, phenomenology, and comparative hermeneutics

Since the beginning of her career, Raynova used the methods of comparative hermeneutics in combination with a new methodological and critical approach that she launched under the neologism of "post-personalism." This perspective was elaborated in her first monograph From existential philosophy to post-personalism (1992) in the context of a detailed hermeneutic comparison of French personalism and existential philosophy. She explores in this book the question of Personalism is a form of Existentialism, as claimed Emmanuel, or, on the contrary, of existential philosophy is a variant of personalism, as asserted by Jean Lacroix and Nikolai Berdyaev. By the means of an analysis of their common topics Raynova shows their specific methodological differences and issues, hence she offers more exact definitions of both currents as well as a new methodology enabling clearer distinctions between the different contemporary philosophical schools.

Trying to overcome some dilemmas of contemporary philosophy, she propounds in conclusion "post-personalism" as a complex methodological alternative based on the following principles: the deconstruction of the conceptions of the personal existence and impersonal being reinterpreted in direction of the Urgrund as a supra-personal ground of being; the existence of a plurality of monadic centers; the personal evolution as a transformation through the free choice of a continuous conversion, i.e. a profound transformation of values and moral attitudes. This methodology is applied in her next book From Husserl to Ricoeur (1993). By retracing the different stages of Husserl's work, which passes from the project of the elaboration of "philosophy as science" (egology) to philosophy as a "general science of mind" (science of the life world), Raynova recovers the critical receptions of this projects in the post-Husserlian thought and analyses the major transformations of the phenomenological approach to human being – the philosophical anthropology, the phenomenology of life, the fundamental ontology, the existential philosophy, neo-thomism and neo-Protestant phenomenology, French personalism, and hermeneutic phenomenology. Thus she shows how the transfigurations of the phenomenological approach passes from the conception of human being as a philosophical object to the conception of being (where Dasein is the "privileged" being) as a fundamental question of philosophy, ending in multiple rivalizing interpretations of subjectivity and unveiling the limits of phenomenology.

As a possible overcoming of this situation Raynova suggests a post-personalist deconstruction of the life world which deconstructs it not as subjectivity but as a center and as a starting point of philosophy. Some of these subjects has been subsequently discussed in interviews with eminent philosophers, published in her book Philosophy at the End of the 20th century (1995), and were later scrutinized in the context of the social and political implications of the phenomenological movement in her book Être et être libre: deux passions des philosophes phénoménologiques (2010). The post-personalist critical methodology was implemented also in her monograph Jean-Paul Sartre, the philosopher without God (1995) where she proposes a reinterpretation of Sartre's philosophical evolution by revisiting the axiological effects of his radical rejection of the hypothesis about God. The question about God and hence the questions if phenomenology can be elaborated as religious philosophy or only as a hermeneutic philosophy of religion are at the core of Raynova's discussions with Paul Ricoeur in Between the Said and the Unsaid (2009). Since 2000 Ricoeur's philosophy became the main subject-matter of her writings where she argues, in contrast to the mainstream interpretations, that there are some important differences in the perspectives of Ricoeur's early phenomenology and his later philosophical works.

== Honors and awards ==
In 1983 Raynova became the First Prize in the National Philosophy Competition from the Bulgarian Ministry of Education and the Council of Higher Education. She was granted in 1996 the Paul Celan Fellowship at the Institut für die Wissenschaften vom Menschen in Vienna. In 1997 she has been visiting scholar at Vienna University and from 1998 to 1999 visiting fellow at the Austrian Academy of Sciences. For her translations of Jean-Paul Sartre's Being and Nothingness and Paul Ricoeur's The Conflict of Interpretations she was awarded the Bulgarian Union of Translators and the National Publishing Center's Translation Award in the field of Humanities. Her monograph Sein, Sinn und Werte: Phänomenologische und hermeneutische Perspektiven des europäischen Denkens (Peter Lang: Frankfurt a.M., 2017) was distinguished as "the highest theoretical achievement in 2017" of the Institute for Philosophy and Sociology and was awarded in 2020 the Prize for extremely important monograph of national importance by the Bulgarian Academy of Sciences.

== Selected bibliography ==
Books

- The Abyss of the Self and the Reflections of the Absolute. A Contribution to the Hermeneutics of the Phenomenological Value Theories (Bezdnata na samostta i otblyasatsite na absolyutnoto). Vienna: Axia Academic Publishers, 2019: ISBN 978-3-903-06827-8
- Sein, Sinn und Werte. Phänomenologische und hermeneutische Perspektiven des europäischen Denkens. Peter Lang: Frankfurt am Main, 2017: ISBN 978-3-631-70591-9
- Between the Said and the Unsaid. In Conversation with Paul Ricoeur. vol.1. Peter Lang: Frankfurt am Main, 2009: ISBN 978-3-631-52452-7
- Etre et être-libre: Deux passions des philosophies phénoménologiques. Peter Lang: Frankfurt am Main, 2010: ISBN 978-3-631-59686-9
- Feministische Philosophie in europäischem Kontext. Gender Debatten zwischen "Ost" und "West". Wien, Köln, Weimar: Böhlau. 2010: ISBN 978-3-205-78495-1
- Philosophy at the End of the 20th Century (Filosofiata v kraia na XX vek) Pleven: EA, 1995: ISBN 954-450-035-9
- Jean-Paul Sartre, the Philosopher without God (Zhan-Pol Sartr, filosofyt bez Bog). Pleven: EA, 1995: ISBN 954-450-036-7
- From Husserl to Ricoeur: The phenomenological approach to Human Being (Ot Huserl do Rikior: Fenomenologicheskiat podhod kym choveka). Sofia: Sofia University Press, 1993: ISBN 954-07-0168-6
- From Existential Philosophy to Post-Personalism (Ot ekzistencialnata filoSofia kym postpersonalizma). Sofia: Apis 90, 1992: ISBN 954-514-003-8

Edited books

- ''Community, Praxis, and Values in a Postmetaphysical Age. Studies on Exclusion and Social Integration in Feminist Theory and Contemporary Philosophy. Vienna: Axia Academic Publishers, 2015: ISBN 978-3-903068-15-5
- Being and Knowledge in Postmetaphysical Context (with V. Petrov). Vienna: IAF, 2008: ISBN 978-3-902295-06-4
- Das integrale und das gebrochene Ganze. Zum 100. Geburtstag von Leo Gabriel. (with S. Moser), Frankfurt: Peter Lang, 2005: ISBN 978-3-631-51254-8
- Simone de Beauvoir: 50 Jahre nach dem Anderen Geschlecht (with S. Moser). Vienna: IAF, 1999; 2. Ed., Frankfurt am Main: Peter Lang, 2004: ISBN 978-3-631-50866-4
- Rethinking Modernity: Philosophy, Values, Gender. Vienna: IAF, 2002: ISBN 3-902295-00-7
- Die feministische Philosophie: Perspektiven und Debatten (with S. Berka and S. Moser). Sofia: Naouka i Iskousvo, 2000.

Studies and articles in English

- "Civil Society and 'Women's Movements' in Post-Communist Europe. An Appraisal 25 Years after the Fall of the Berlin Wall," in Yvanka B. Raynova (ed.) Community, Praxis, and Values in a Postmetaphysical Age. Studies on Exclusion and Social Integration in Feminist Theory and Contemporary Philosophy. Vienna: Axia Academic Publishers, 2015, pp. 184–204.
- "Human Rights, Women's Rights, Gender Mainstreaming, and Diversity: The Language Question," in Yvanka B. Raynova (ed.). Community, Praxis, and Values in a Postmetaphysical Age. Studies on Exclusion and Social Integration in Feminist Theory and Contemporary Philosophy. Vienna: Axia Academic Publishers, 2015, pp. 38–89.
- "Main Trends in the Reception of Phenomenology, Existential Philosophy, and Hermeneutics in Bulgaria." In: T. Batuleva (Ed.). Philosophical Receptions: Transmissions, Affinities and Originality. Sofia: Publishing House "St. Ivan Rilski", 2014, pp. 118–156.
- "European Values – A Kind of 'Terror' or a Chance for Union?" In: A. Gungov, K. Mamdani (eds.). Rights and values in an Expanding Europe: A Mutual Enrichment Through Different Traditions. Sofia: St. Kliment Ohridski University Press, 2011, pp. 9–27.
- "Paul Ricoeur". In: Hans R. Sepp, Lester Embree (Ed.). Handbook of Phenomenological Aesthetics (Contributions To Phenomenology, vol. 59), Springer, 2010, pp. 291–294.
- "All that gives us to think." In: A. Wiercinski (Ed.) Between Suspicion and Sympathy. Paul Ricoeur’s Unstable Equilibrium. The Hermeneutic Press, Toronto, 2003, pp. 670–696.
- "Jean-Paul Sartre: A profound Revision of Husserlian Phenomenology." In: A.-T. Tymieniecka (Ed.), Phenomenology World Wide. Foundations – Expanding Dynamics – Life-Engagements, Dordrecht: Kluwer Academic Publishers, 2002, pp. 323–335.
- "Maurice Merleau-Ponty's Tourning Point and the Ethics of Responsibility". In: D. H. Davis (Ed.) Merleau-Ponty's Later Works and Their Practical Implications: The Dehiscence of Responsibility. Humanity Books, Prometheus Press, New York, 2001, pp. 225–251.
- "'The Human "Animal': Prolegomenon to a Phenomenology of Monstrousness.- I “.- In: A.-T. Tymienecka (Ed.), The Human “Animal”, Analecta Husserliana, Vol. LVII, Kluwer Academic Publishers, 1998, pp. 107–116.
- "Visions from the ashes: The philosophical life in Bulgaria from 1945 to 1992" (Co-author W. McBride). In: Philosophy and Political Change in Eastern Europe, The Monist Library of Philosophy, La Salle, Illinois, 1993, pp. 103–134.
