= Chmielnik, Świętokrzyskie Voivodeship =

Chmielnik
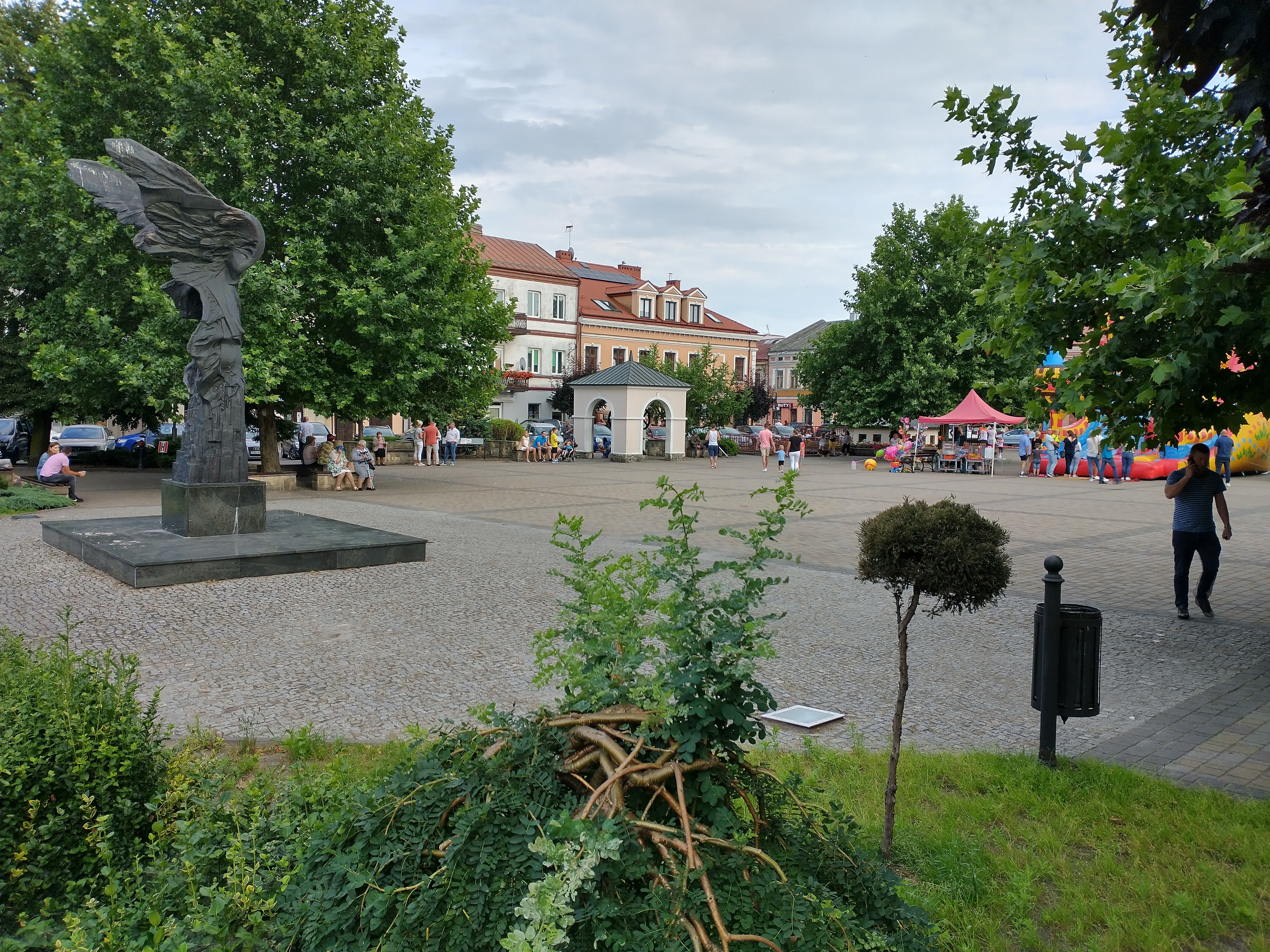
- Market Square in Chmielnik

- Coat of arms

- Location within Poland
- Coordinates: 50°36′42″N 20°44′59″E
- Country: Poland
- Voivodeship: Świętokrzyskie
- County: Kielce
- Gmina: Chmielnik
- Town rights: 1551

Government
  - Mayor: Paweł Wójcik (PiS)

Area
  - Total: 7.9 km^{2} (3.1 sq mi)
- Elevation: 240 m (790 ft)

Population (31 December 2021)
  - Total: 3,557
  - Density: 450/km^{2} (1,200/sq mi)
- Time zone: UTC+1 (CET)
  - Summer (DST): UTC+2 (CEST)
- Postal code: 26-020
- Area code: +48 41
- Car plates: TKI
- Website: http://www.chmielnik.com

Chmielnik [ˈxmʲɛlɲik] is a town in Kielce County, Świętokrzyskie Voivodeship, Poland. As of December 2021, it has a population of 3,557, and lies in historic Lesser Poland. The name of the town is derived from hop (Polish: chmiel).

== History ==
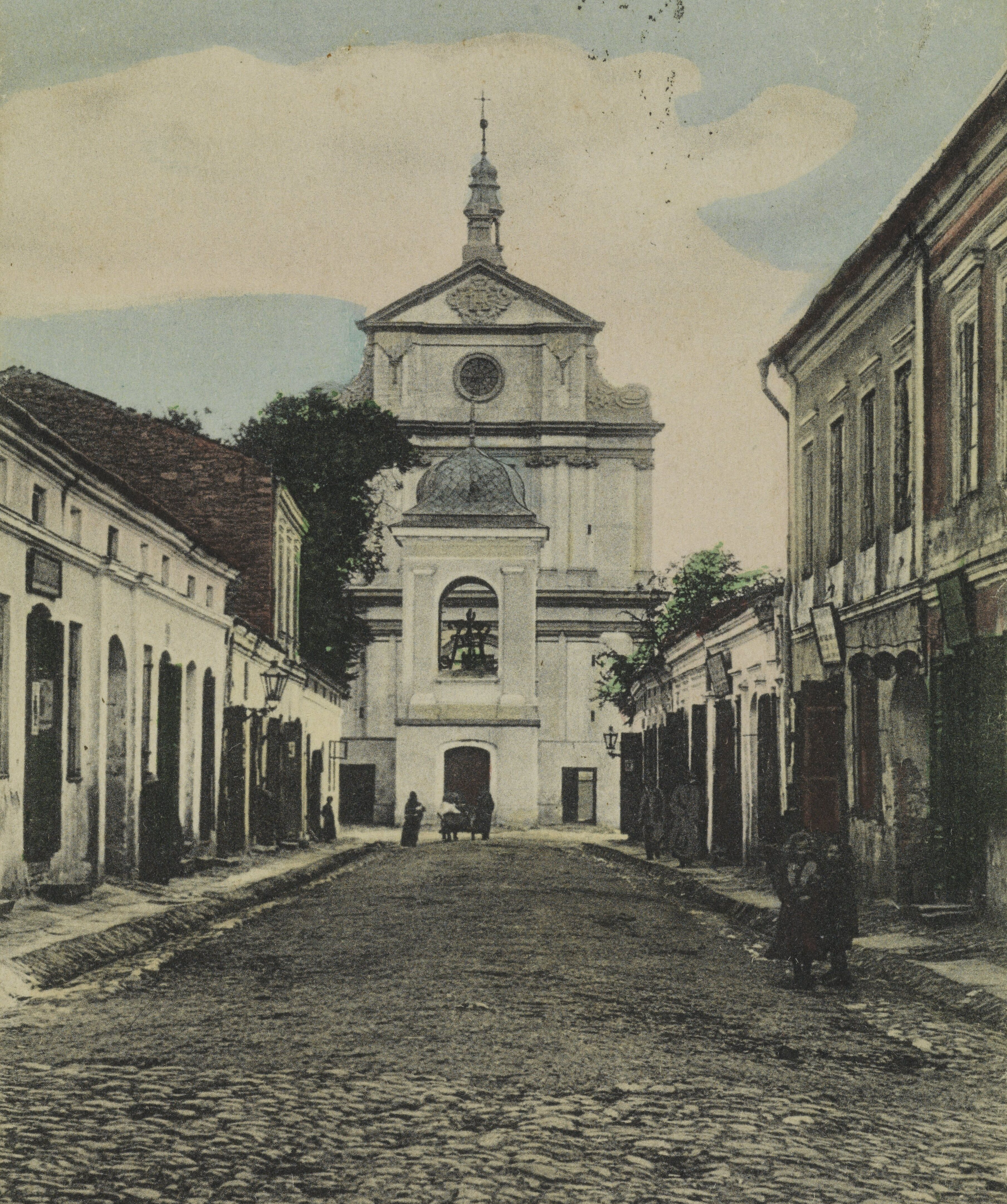
View of the church before 1908

Chmielnik was first mentioned in connection with the Battle of Chmielnik with Mongols and Tatars fought in the area in 1241 (see Mongol invasion of Poland). The Mongols and the Tatars were opposed near the settlement by Polish knights from the provinces of Sandomierz and Kraków. In the town there is a monument dedicated to this battle. At the beginning the settlement was a property of the dukes of Sandomierz, but in the 13th century it became owned by the Odrowąż family. The oldest monument in the town is the Church of Holy Trinity together with a church graveyard from around 1356. Later on Chmielnik belonged to the Oleśnicki family who made efforts to grant it town charter. In 1551 Chmielnik was granted Magdeburg town rights by king Sigismund II Augustus, hereby formally becoming a town. In 1580 king Stephen Báthory granted the town a privilege of organizing more fairs. At the beginning of the 17th century the ownership of the town was transferred to the Gołuchowski family.

In the 16th and 17th centuries the town was a major centre of Polish Protestants (Calvinists and the Polish Brethren). On the basis of privilege granted by Krzysztof Gołuchowski in the second part of the 17th century the town was populated by Sephardi Jews expelled from Spain. They built a synagogue in 1638 and took over houses and shops of the Polish Brethren expelled from the town in 1658. In 1787 Chmielnik became a property of the Chłapowski family. After the Third Partition of Poland the town was taken by the Habsburg Empire (1795). In the years 1809–1815 it was in the Duchy of Warsaw, later in the Russian-controlled Congress Poland (1815–1915). In 1829 Dezydery, the last of the Chłapowski family, sold the town to Kazimierz Tański, a Polish general who participated in the Kościuszko Uprising and Polish national liberation struggles in the early 19th century. It was in the hands of this family until 1945. On January 20, 1864 a battle of the Polish January Uprising against the Russians was fought in Chmielnik.

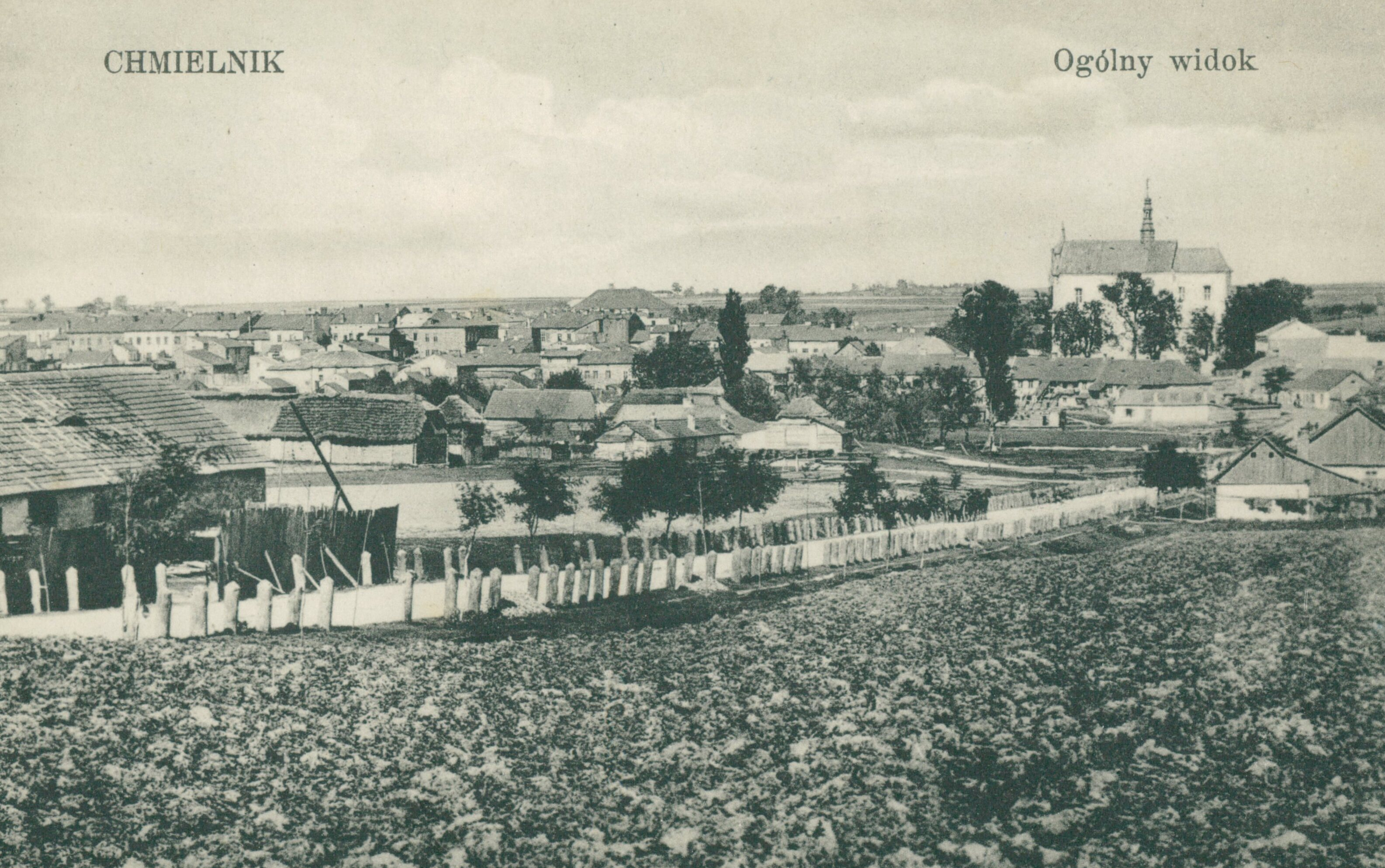
General view before 1920

Before the Second World War, over 80% of the 12,000 inhabitants were Jews. After capturing the town in 1939 the Germans slowly discriminated against the Polish and Jewish population, which swelled during the war as Jews fled from other towns arrived at Chmielnik. Over several months Germans transported Jews to concentration camps, mainly Treblinka, where they were exterminated. The Germans also deported over 1,600 people for forced labor, and, still in Chmielnik, carried out executions of Poles and Jews from the town as well as from other places. The Polish resistance movement was active in the area, secret Polish teaching was organized.

Just after the war, only four Jewish residents residing in the town had survived. The remaining Holocaust survivors emigrated, mostly to Israel, Canada and the United States. There is renewed interest in Chmielnik's Jewish heritage although no Jew has lived there for decades. The synagogue has been renovated and transformed into a museum to the memory of the Jews of the region. A historic mikveh was discovered in the basement of an adjacent building, and a restoration is planned to make it another heritage site.

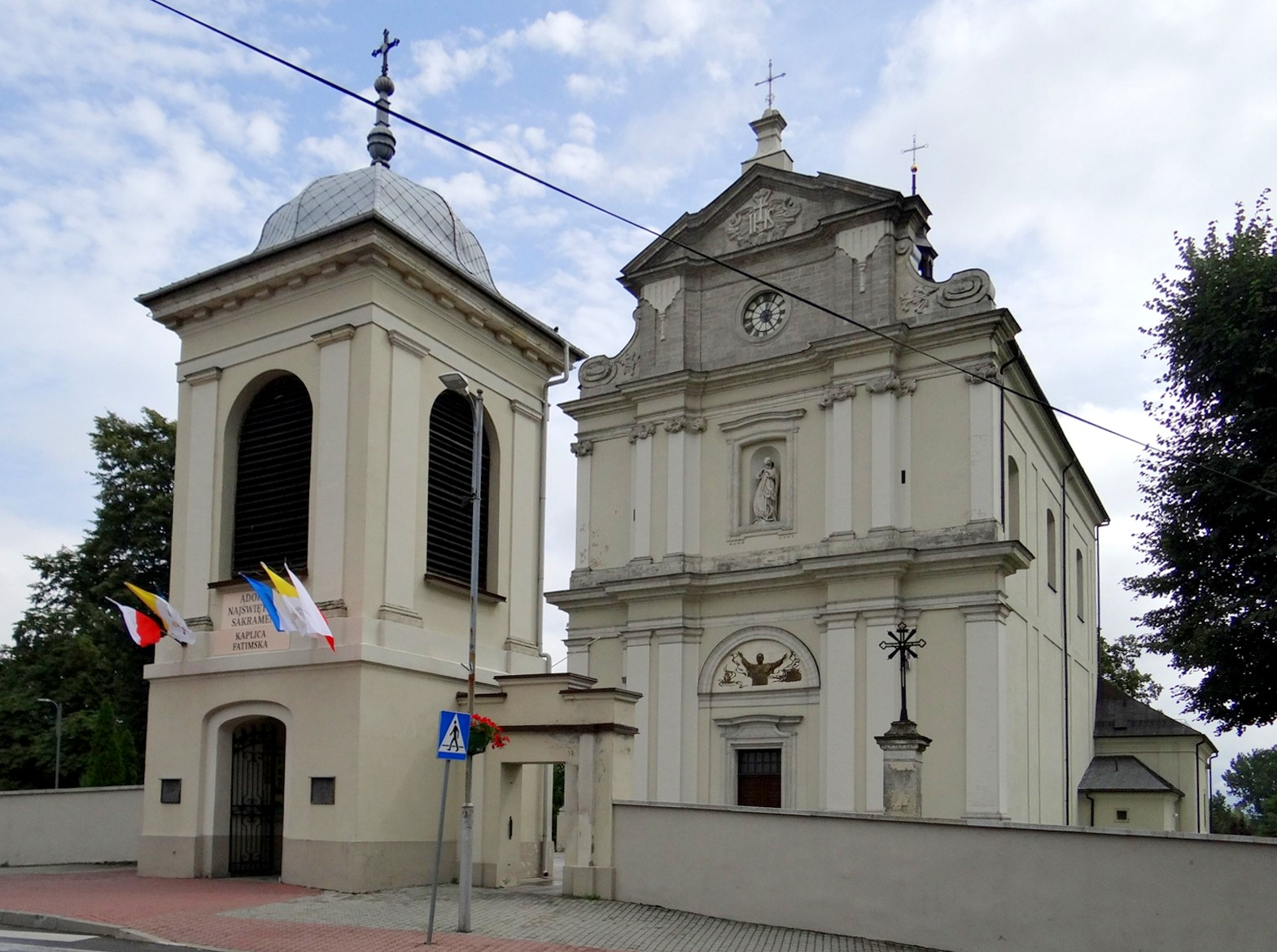
Baroque Immaculate Conception church

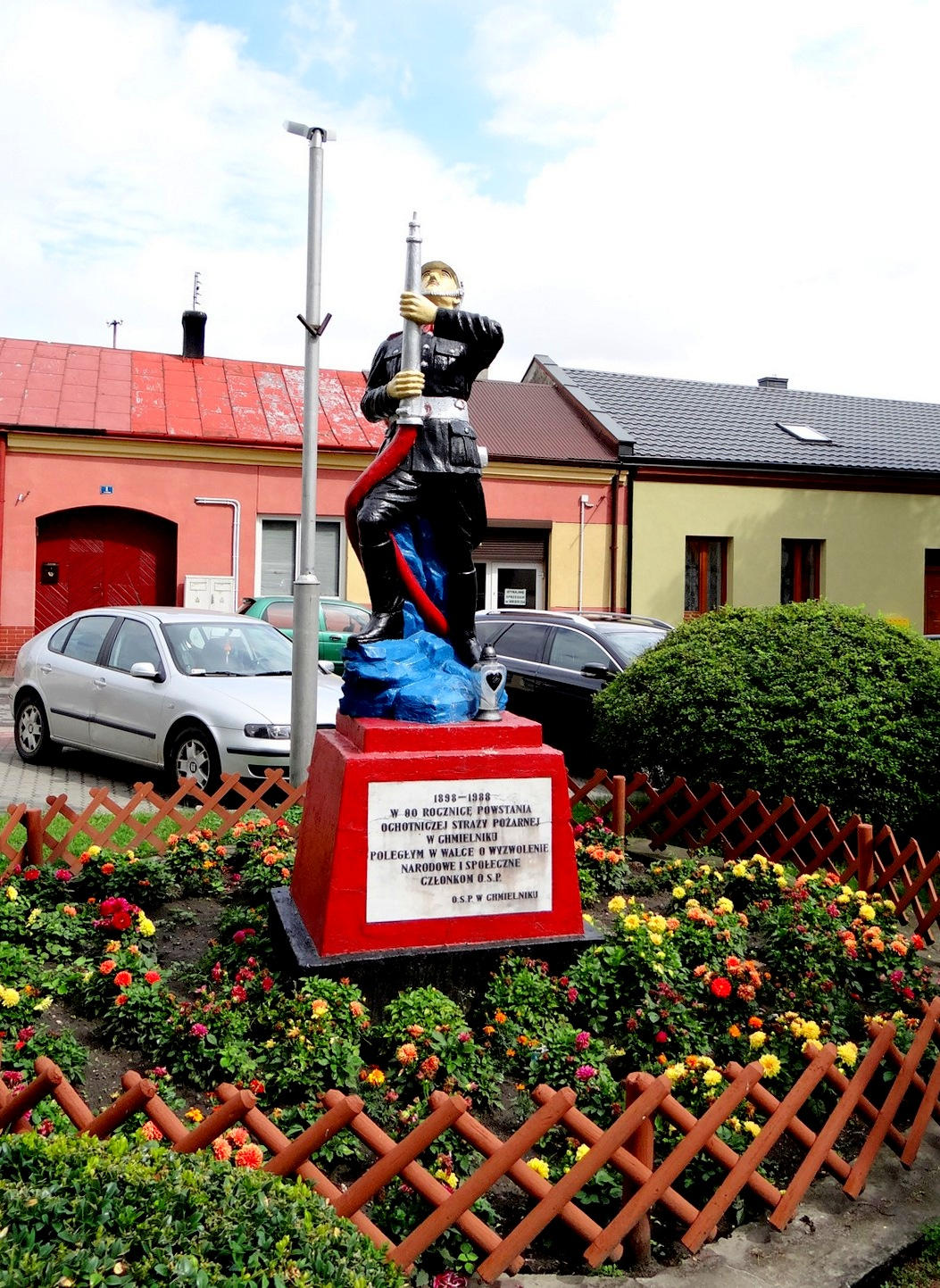
Fireman monument

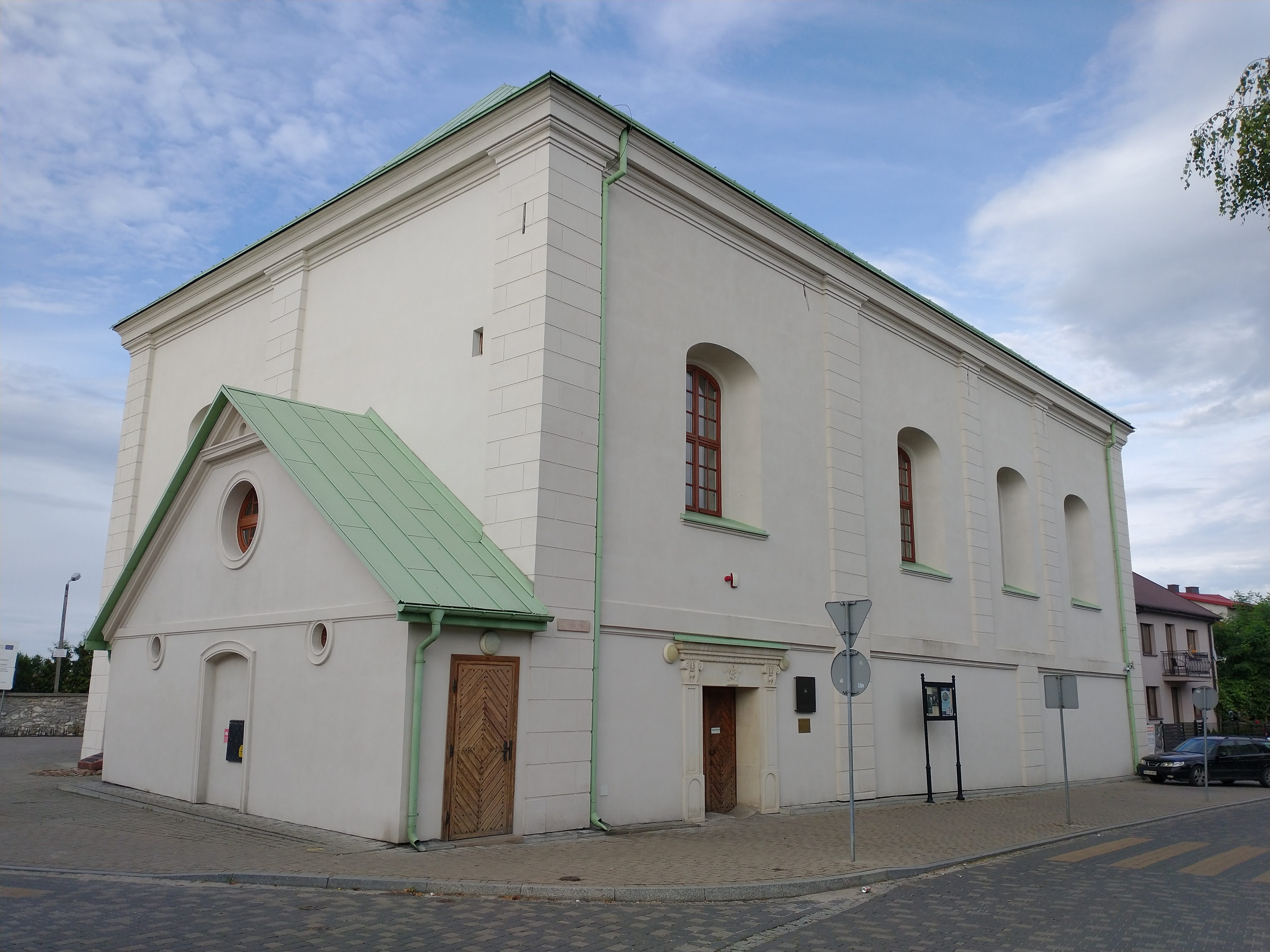
Former synagogue

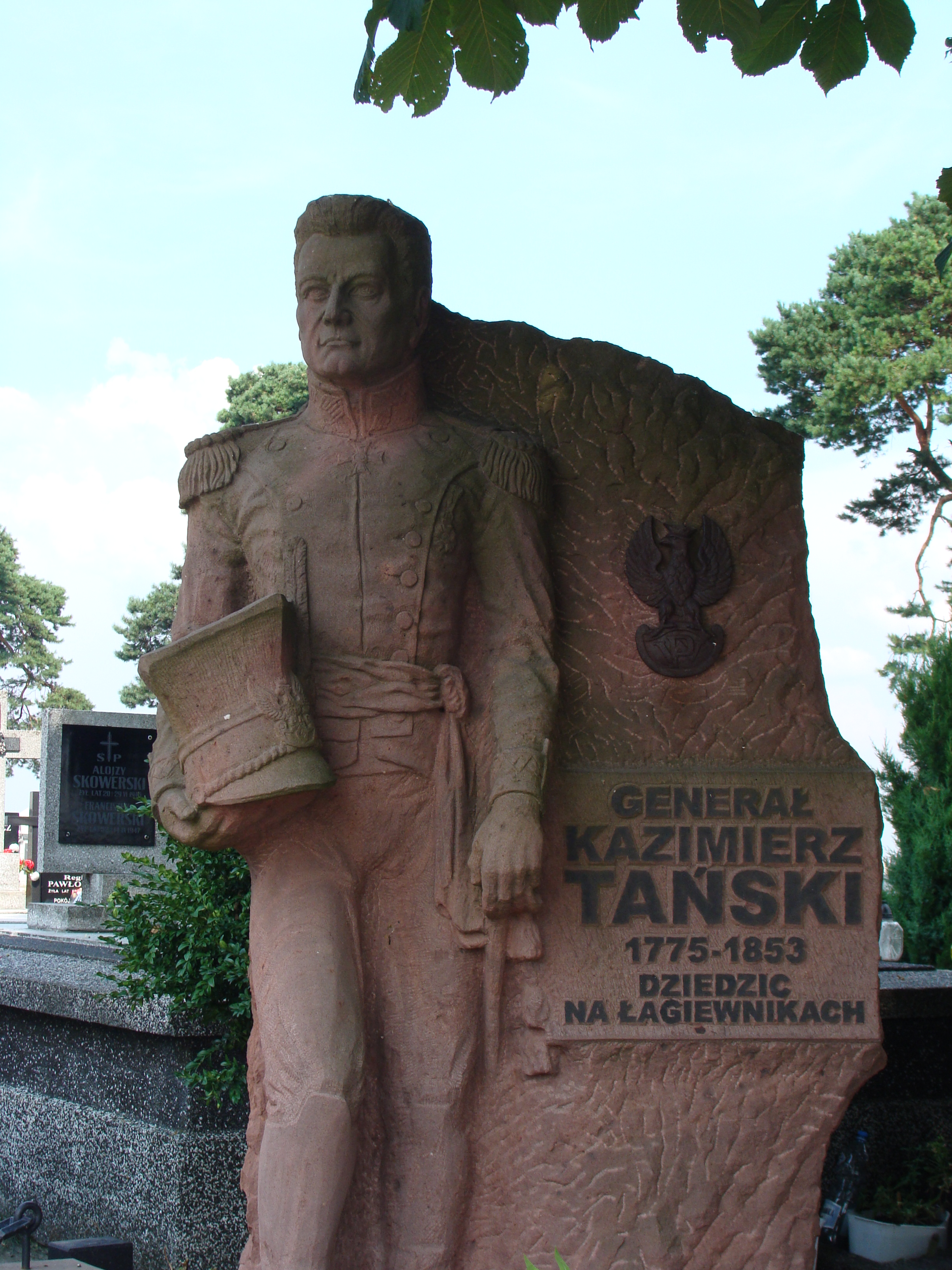
Monument of Kazimierz Tański at the local cemetery

== Demographics ==
Detailed data as of 31 December 2021:

Description	All		Women		Men	
Unit	person	percentage	person	percentage	person	percentage
Population	3557	100	1856	52.2%	1701	47.8%
Population density	450.3		235.0		215.3	

=== Number of inhabitants by year ===
Year	Population	Source
1995	4290 ▲	
2000	4159 ▼	
2005	4016 ▼	
2010	3987 ▼	
2015	3841 ▼	
2020	3596 ▼	
2021	3557 ▼	

== Transport ==
Chmielnik lies on the intersection of national roads 78 and 73.

National road 73 connects Chmielnik to Kielce to the north and to Busko-Zdrój to the south.

Voivodeship road 765 bypasses Chmielnik to the north.

== Sports ==
Chmielnik is home to a sports club Zenit, established in 1946.

== Notable people ==
- Melchior Buliński (1810–1877), priest and historian
- Herbert Klarman (1916–1999), American economist
- Angelyne (born 1950), American model, singer, and pop culture icon.
