= Garbatka (disambiguation) =

Garbatka may refer to

- Garbatka, Greater Poland Voivodeship - a village in the administrative district of Gmina Rogoźno, within Oborniki County, Greater Poland Voivodeship.
- Garbatka, Masovian Voivodeship - a village in the administrative district of Gmina Lesznowola, within Piaseczno County, Masovian Voivodeship.
- Garbatka-Letnisko - a village in Kozienice County, Masovian Voivodeship.
  - Garbatka Długa - a village in the administrative district of Gmina Garbatka-Letnisko, within Kozienice County, Masovian Voivodeship.
  - Garbatka Nowa - a village in the administrative district of Gmina Garbatka-Letnisko, within Kozienice County, Masovian Voivodeship.
  - Garbatka-Dziewiątka - a village in the administrative district of Gmina Garbatka-Letnisko, within Kozienice County, Masovian Voivodeship.
  - Garbatka-Zbyczyn - a village in the administrative district of Gmina Garbatka-Letnisko, within Kozienice County, Masovian Voivodeship.
