= Zagożdżonka =

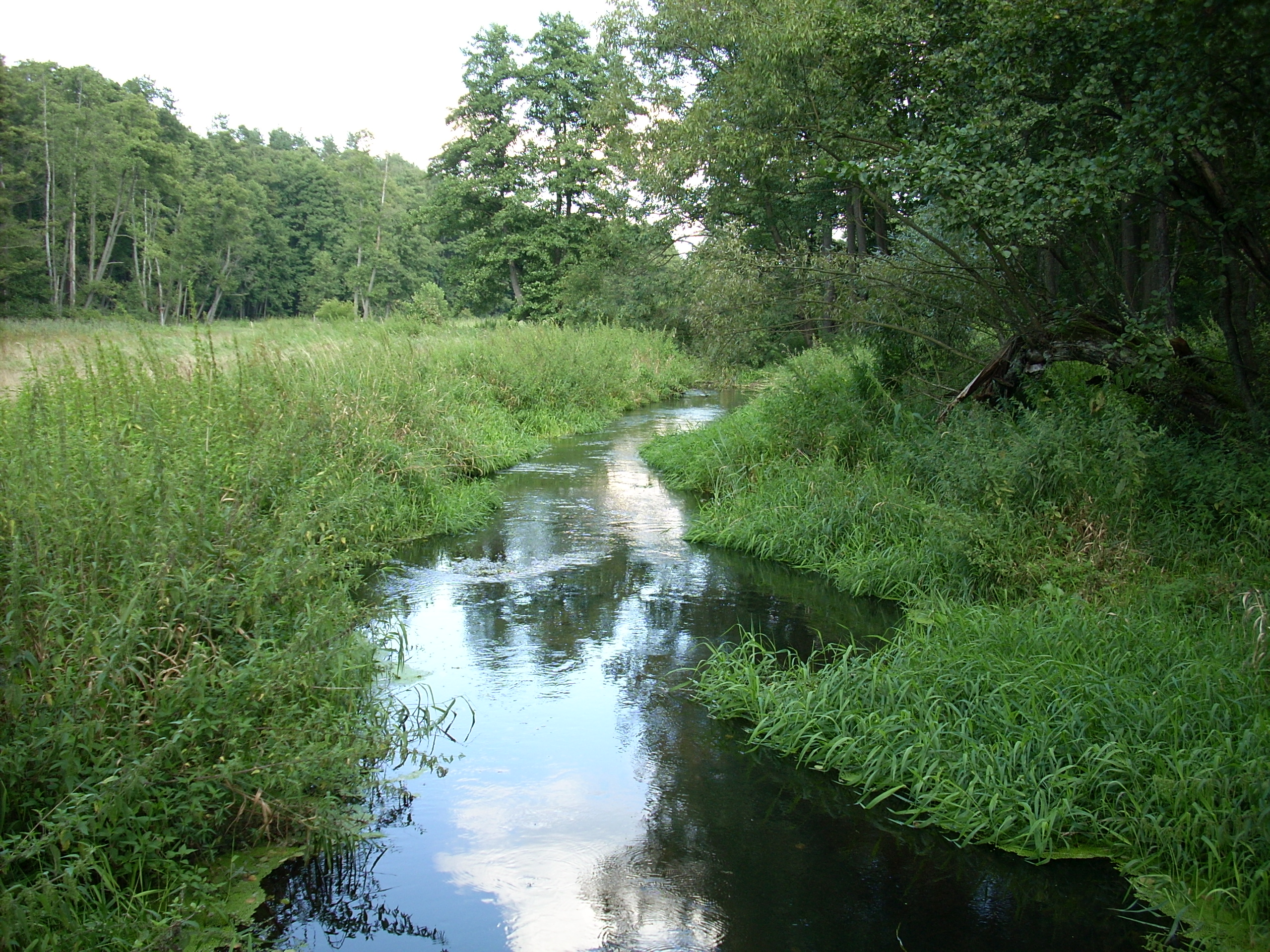
- Zagożdżonka in Cudów

Location
- Country: Poland
- Voivodeship: Masovian

Physical characteristics
- Source
  - location: southwest of Helenów, Radom County
  - coordinates: 51°23′45.5″N 21°25′27.0″E
- Mouth: Vistula
  - location: north of Świerże Górne, Kozienice County
  - coordinates: 51°39′42″N 21°29′03″E
  - elevation: 102.5 m (336 ft)
- Length: 46.21 km (28.71 mi)
- Basin size: 568.5 km^{2} (219.5 mi^{2})
- Discharge
  - average: 3 m^{3}/s (110 cu ft/s)

Basin features
- Progression: Vistula→ Baltic Sea

Zagożdżonka is a river of Poland. It flows into the Vistula near Świerże Górne.

The river flows out near the village of Czarna and flows through the Kozienicka Forest. It flows through Pionki and Kozienice. It flows into the Vistula River in Świerże Górne. Its left tributaries are the Czarna, Pianka, Zurawnik and Brzeźniczka, and its right tributaries are the Mirenka (Mireń), Trupień, Studzionek, and Gniewoszowsko-Kozienicki Canal.

== See also ==
- Krypianka
