= Brzustów, Masovian Voivodeship =

Brzustów
- Village
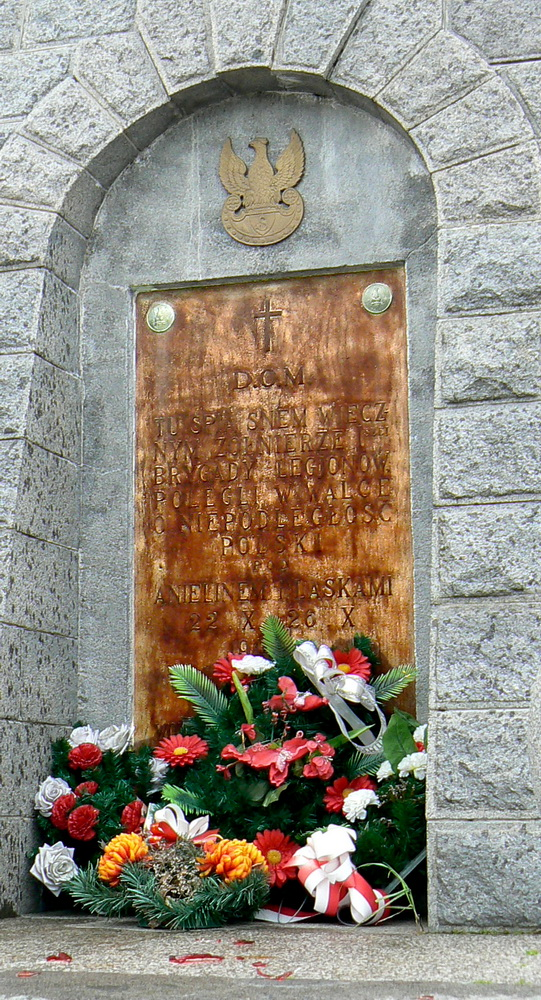
- Monument-mausoleum erected in honor of fallen Legionnaires.

- Location within Poland
- Coordinates: 51°28′26″N 21°34′10″E
- Country: Poland
- Voivodeship: Masovian
- Powiat: Kozienice
- Gmina: Garbatka-Letnisko
- Sołectwo: Brzustów

Government
  - Wójt: Tadeusz Molenda
- Population (2003): 211
- Time zone: UTC+1 (CET)
  - Summer (DST): UTC+2 (CEST)
- Postal code: 26-930
- Phone area code(s) (within Poland): 48 xxx xx xx
- Car plate(s): WKZ

Brzustów [ˈbʐustuf] is a village in the administrative district of Gmina Garbatka-Letnisko, within Kozienice County, Masovian Voivodeship, in east-central Poland.

== History ==
At the beginning of World War I (Autumn 1914) Kozienice forest became a long-term military audience. During the so-called, Dęblin operation, in the region of Laski-Anielin fought the Polish Legions troops, led by the Józef Piłsudski.

On October 22 the II battalion of Polish Legions led by Major Edward Rydz-Śmigły fought in the woods near the village of Anielin fierce and bloody battle with 3 Russian battalions.

And on October 22–26, 1914, the branch of I Brigade of the Polish Legions, fought heavy battle with Russian troops in the village of Laski.

In 1933 a monument-mausoleum erected in honor of fallen legionnaires, moving in a place with the remains scattered around the graves, the mass grave in Brzustów. The monument is located near the railway station Żytkowice.

== See also ==
- Brzustów
- Brzustówek
