= Łękawica =

Łękawica may refer to the following places:

- Łękawica, Tarnów County in Lesser Poland Voivodeship (south Poland)
- Łękawica, Wadowice County in Lesser Poland Voivodeship (south Poland)
- Łękawica, Kozienice County in Masovian Voivodeship (east-central Poland)
- Łękawica, Mińsk County in Masovian Voivodeship (east-central Poland)
- Łękawica, Silesian Voivodeship (south Poland)

It may also refer to a Łękawica (ordinary) in heraldry.
