= Wyborów, Masovian Voivodeship =

Wyborów
- Village
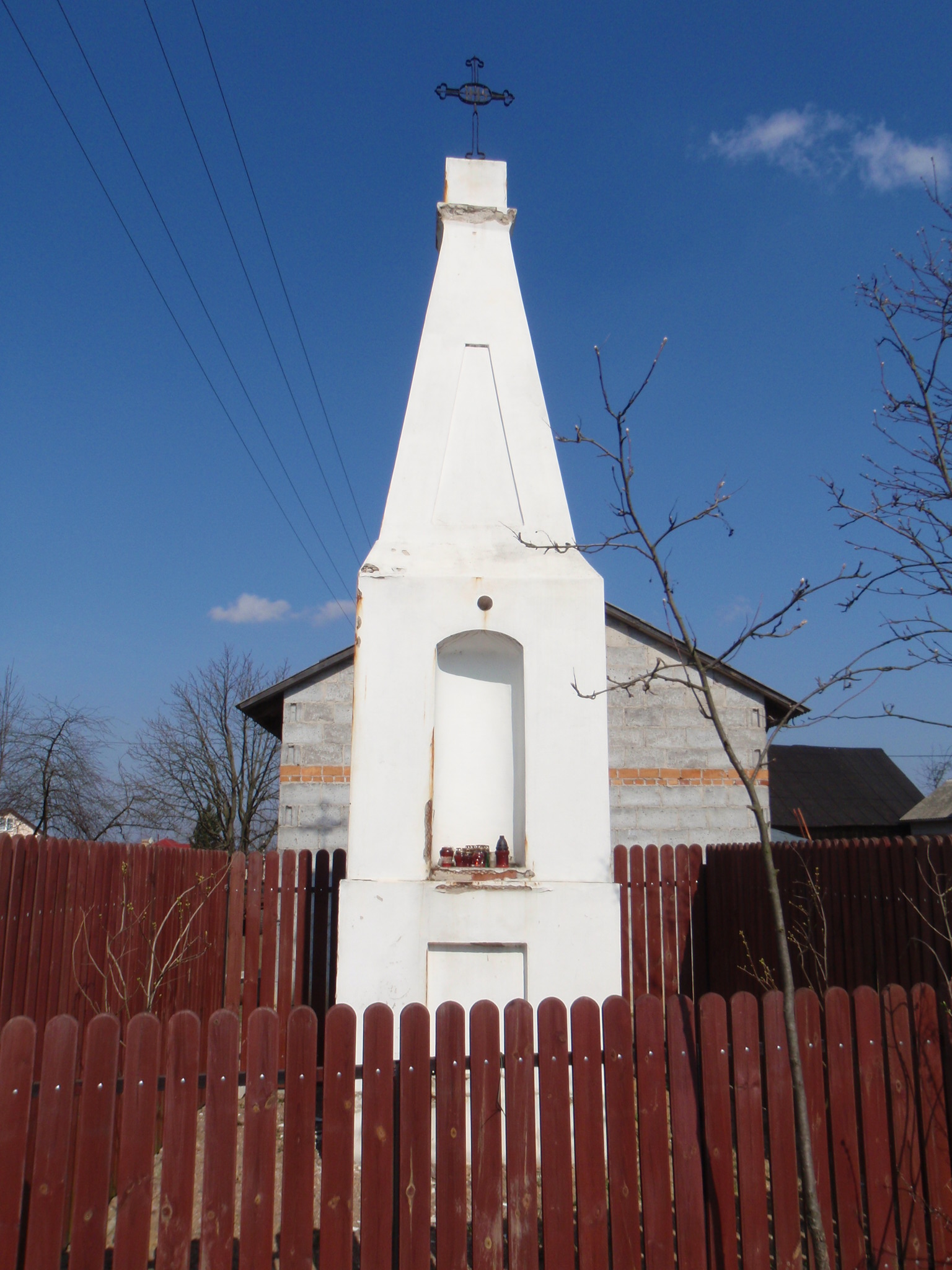

- Location within Poland
- Coordinates: 51°44′19″N 21°13′39″E
- Country: Poland
- Voivodeship: Masovian
- County: Kozienice
- Gmina: Grabów nad Pilicą
- Population: 230

Wyborów [vɨˈbɔruf] is a village in the administrative district of Gmina Grabów nad Pilicą, within Kozienice County, Masovian Voivodeship, in east-central Poland.
