= Samwodzie =

- Village
- Location within Poland
- Coordinates: 51°35′51″N 21°38′02″E
- Country: Poland
- Voivodeship: Masovian
- County: Kozienice
- Gmina: Kozienice

Samwodzie [samˈvɔd͡ʑɛ] is a village in the administrative district of Gmina Kozienice, within Kozienice County, Masovian Voivodeship, in east-central Poland.
