= Wólka Tyrzyńska B =

- Village
- Location within Poland
- Coordinates: 51°35′05″N 21°36′56″E
- Country: Poland
- Voivodeship: Masovian
- County: Kozienice
- Township: Kozienice
- Time zone: UTC+1 (CET)
  - Summer (DST): UTC+2 (CEST)
- Postal code: 26-922 Kozienice
- Phone area code(s) (within Poland): 48 xxx xx xx
- Car plate: WKZ

Wólka Tyrzyńska B is a village in the administrative district of Gmina Kozienice, within Kozienice County, Masovian Voivodeship, in east-central Poland.
