= Janików-Folwark =

- Village
- Location within Poland
- Coordinates: 51°34′02″N 21°35′58″E
- Country: Poland
- Voivodeship: Masovian
- County: Kozienice
- Gmina: Kozienice

Janików-Folwark [jaˈnikuf ˈfɔlvark] is a village in the administrative district of Gmina Kozienice, within Kozienice County, Masovian Voivodeship, in east-central Poland.
