= Majdany, Masovian Voivodeship =

Majdany
- Village
- Location within Poland
- Coordinates: 51°36′52″N 21°29′46″E
- Country: Poland
- Voivodeship: Masovian
- County: Kozienice
- Gmina: Kozienice

Majdany (Polish pronunciation: [majˈdanɨ]) is a village in the administrative district of Gmina Kozienice, within Kozienice County, Masovian Voivodeship, in east-central Poland.
