= Sławczyn =

- Village
- Location within Poland
- Coordinates: 51°31′N 21°48′E
- Country: Poland
- Voivodeship: Masovian
- County: Kozienice
- Gmina: Gniewoszów

Sławczyn [ˈswaft͡ʂɨn] is a village in the administrative district of Gmina Gniewoszów, within Kozienice County, Masovian Voivodeship, in east-central Poland.
