= Dąbrówki, Gmina Kozienice =

Dąbrówki
- Village
- Location within Poland
- Coordinates: 51°35′13″N 21°36′5″E
- Country: Poland
- Voivodeship: Masovian
- County: Kozienice
- Gmina: Kozienice

Dąbrówki (Polish pronunciation: [dɔmˈbrufkʲi]) is a village in the administrative district of Gmina Kozienice, within Kozienice County, Masovian Voivodeship, in east-central Poland.
