= Holendry Kuźmińskie =

- Village
- Location within Poland
- Coordinates: 51°39′N 21°32′E
- Country: Poland
- Voivodeship: Masovian
- County: Kozienice
- Gmina: Kozienice

Holendry Kuźmińskie [xɔˈlɛndrɨ kuʑˈmiɲskʲɛ] (German Kuschminer Holland) is a village in the administrative district of Gmina Kozienice, within Kozienice County, Masovian Voivodeship, in East-Central Poland.
