= Bąkowiec =

- Village
- Location within Poland
- Coordinates: 51°30′14″N 21°42′41″E
- Country: Poland
- Voivodeship: Masovian
- Powiat: Kozienice
- Gmina: Garbatka-Letnisko
- Sołectwo: Bąkowiec

Government
  - Wójt: Tadeusz Molenda
- Elevation: 160 m (520 ft)
- Population (2006): 500
- Time zone: UTC+1 (CET)
  - Summer (DST): UTC+2 (CEST)
- Postal code: 26-930
- Phone area code(s) (within Poland): 48 xxx xx xx
- Car plate(s): WKZ

Bąkowiec [bɔnˈkɔvjɛt͡s] is a village in the administrative district of Gmina Garbatka-Letnisko, within Kozienice County, Masovian Voivodeship, in east-central Poland.

== History ==
26 July 1945 - Division of AK (the commander Bernaciak Marian) released from transport, near Bąkowiec, about 120 prisoners, including many soldiers of underground armies. Among those freed were Lt. Col. Antoni Żurowski "Andrzej Bober" - the commander of VI Division Warszawa-Praga of Armia Krajowa and Lt. Col. Henryk Krajewski "Trzaska" - commander of 30 Poleski Infantry Division in Action "Burza" (English: Storm).
