= Budy Augustowskie =

- Village
- Location within Poland
- Coordinates: 51°40′25″N 21°11′27″E
- Country: Poland
- Voivodeship: Masovian
- County: Kozienice
- Gmina: Grabów nad Pilicą
- Population: 90

Budy Augustowskie [ˈbudɨ auɡusˈtɔfskʲɛ] is a village in the administrative district of Gmina Grabów nad Pilicą, within Kozienice County, Masovian Voivodeship, in east-central Poland.
