= Budy, Kozienice County =

Budy
- Village
- Location within Poland
- Coordinates: 51°34′36″N 21°31′13″E
- Country: Poland
- Voivodeship: Masovian
- County: Kozienice
- Gmina: Kozienice

Budy [ˈbudɨ] is a village in the administrative district of Gmina Kozienice, within Kozienice County, Masovian Voivodeship, in east-central Poland.
