= Janików, Kozienice County =

Janików
- Village
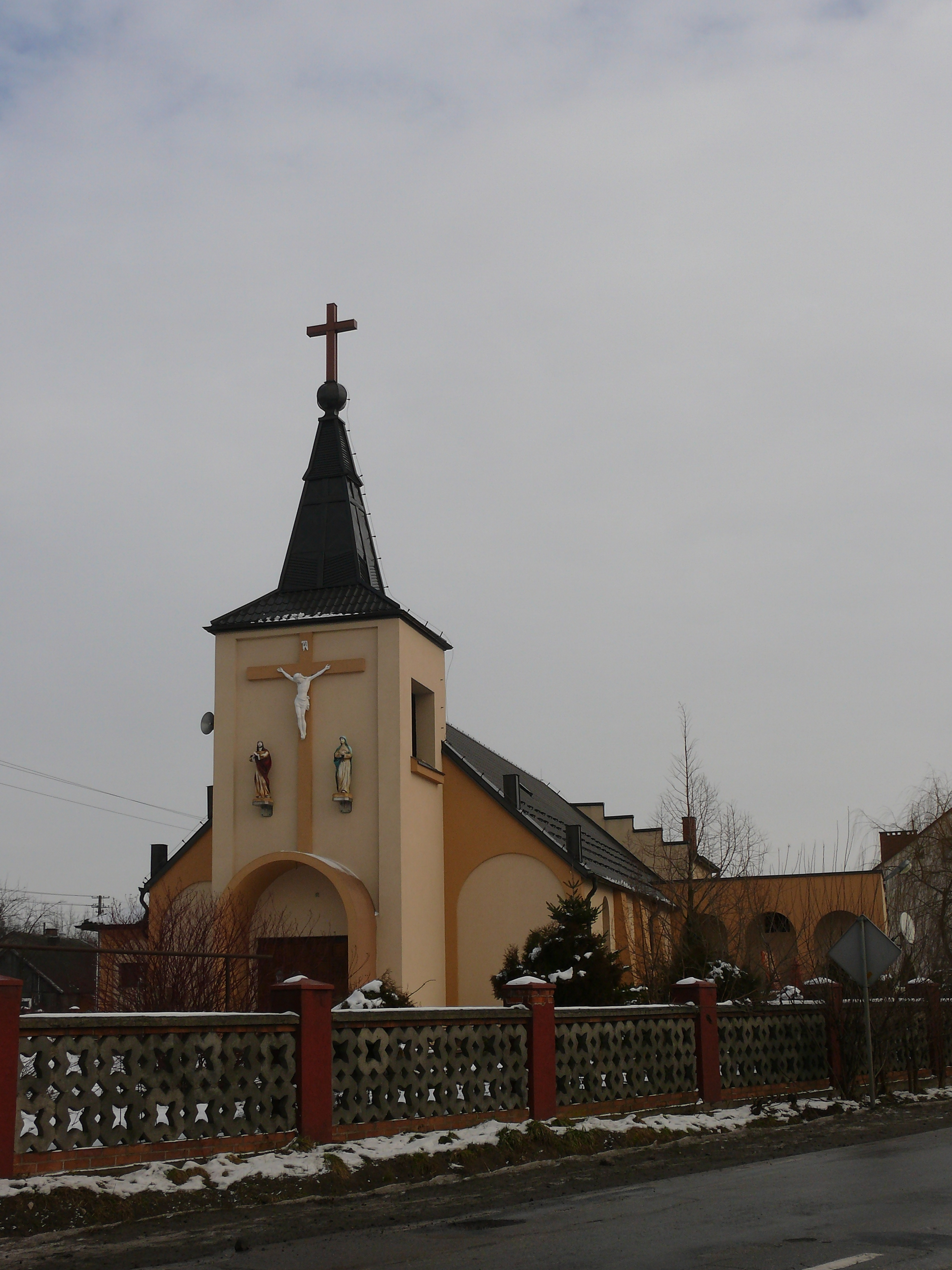
- Church in Janików

- Location within Poland
- Coordinates: 51°34′16″N 21°35′12″E
- Country: Poland
- Voivodeship: Masovian
- County: Kozienice
- Gmina: Kozienice
- Population (approx.): 600

Janików [jaˈnikuf] is a village in the administrative district of Gmina Kozienice, within Kozienice County, Masovian Voivodeship, in east-central Poland.
