= Grabów Nowy =

- Village
- Location within Poland
- Coordinates: 51°43′N 21°15′E
- Country: Poland
- Voivodeship: Masovian
- County: Kozienice
- Gmina: Grabów nad Pilicą
- Population: 180

Grabów Nowy [ˈɡrabuf ˈnɔvɨ] is a village in the administrative district of Gmina Grabów nad Pilicą, within Kozienice County, Masovian Voivodeship, in east-central Poland.
