= Krypianka =

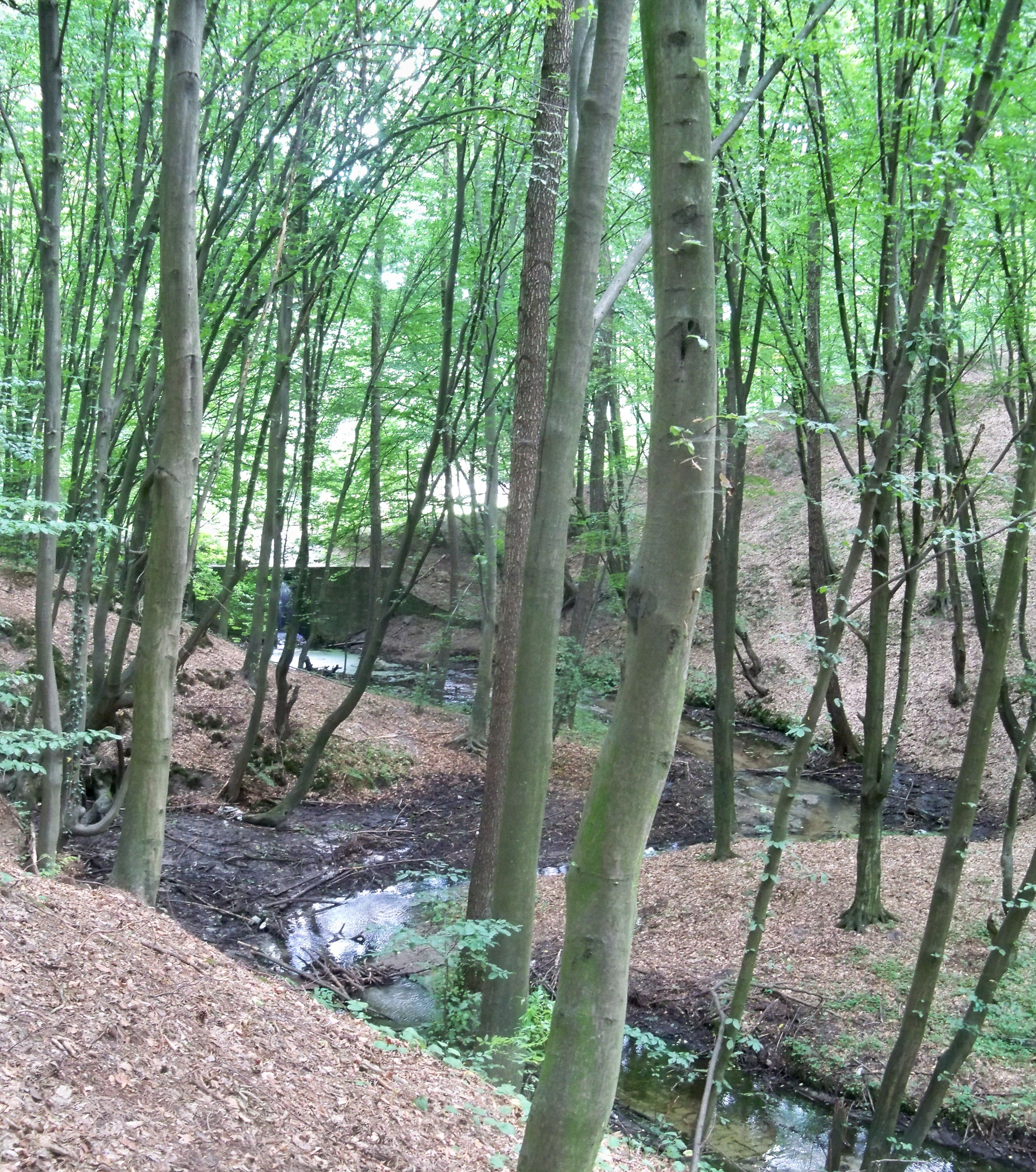

Location
- Country: Poland

Physical characteristics
- Mouth
  - location: Gniewoszowsko-Kozienicki Canal
  - coordinates: 51.5831°N 21.6139°E

Basin features
- Progression: Zagożdżonka→ Vistula→ Baltic Sea

Krypianka is a river of Poland. Near Wólka Tyrzyńska it flows into the Gniewoszowsko-Kozienicki Canal, which discharges into the Zagożdżonka.

== See also ==
- Krępiec (river)
