= Piotrkowice, Kozienice County =

Piotrkowice
- Village
- Location within Poland
- Coordinates: 51°38′10″N 21°32′38″E
- Country: Poland
- Voivodeship: Masovian
- County: Kozienice
- Gmina: Kozienice

Piotrkowice [pjɔtrkɔˈvit͡sɛ] is a village in the administrative district of Gmina Kozienice, within Kozienice County, Masovian Voivodeship, in east-central Poland.
