= Czerwonka, Kozienice County =

Czerwonka
- Village
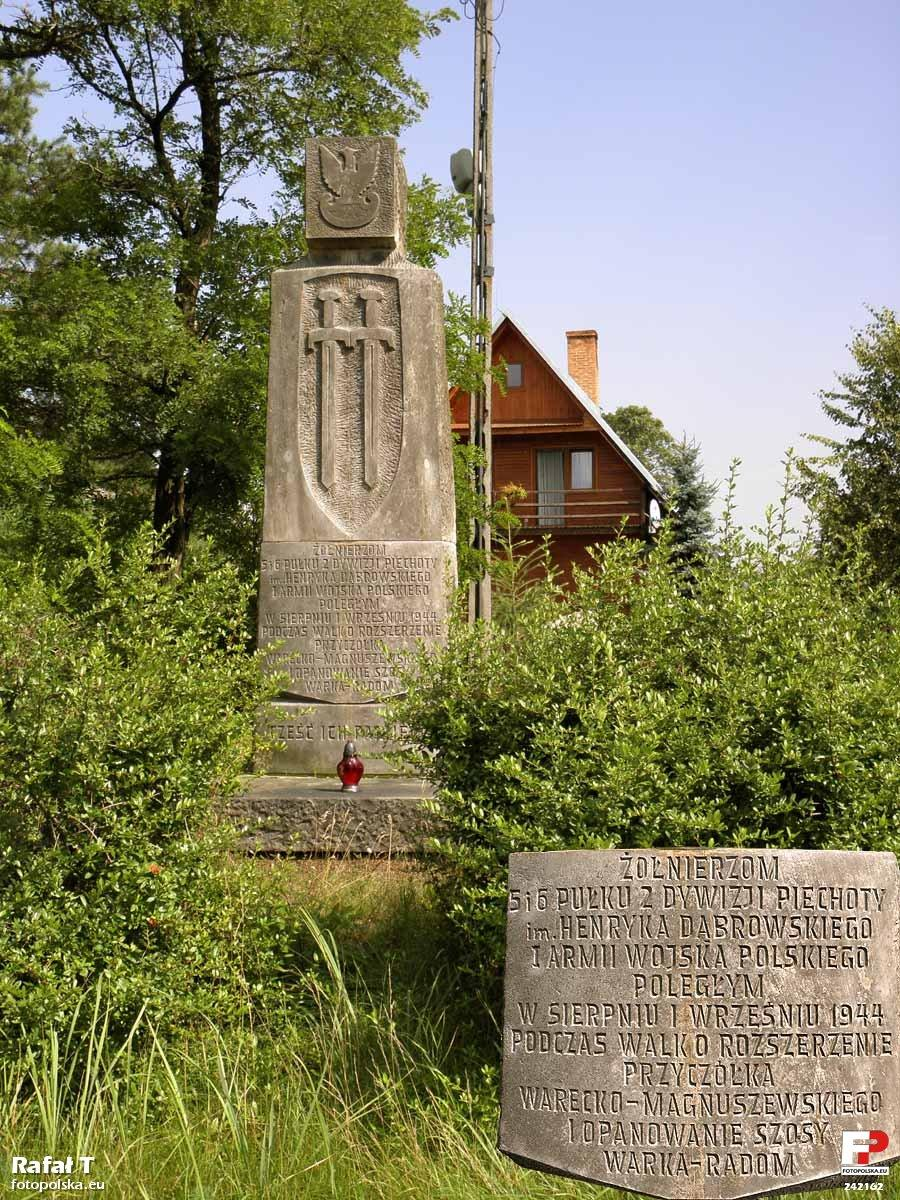

- Location within Poland
- Coordinates: 51°45′2″N 21°12′23″E
- Country: Poland
- Voivodeship: Masovian
- County: Kozienice
- Gmina: Grabów nad Pilicą
- Population: 80

Czerwonka [t͡ʂɛrˈvɔnka] is a village in the administrative district of Gmina Grabów nad Pilicą, within Kozienice County, Masovian Voivodeship, in east-central Poland.
