= Tomczyn =

- Village
- Location within Poland
- Coordinates: 51°45′27″N 21°15′8″E
- Country: Poland
- Voivodeship: Masovian
- County: Kozienice
- Gmina: Grabów nad Pilicą
- Population: 90

Tomczyn [ˈtɔmt͡ʂɨn] is a village in the administrative district of Gmina Grabów nad Pilicą, within Kozienice County, Masovian Voivodeship, in east-central Poland.
