= Nowa Wola, Kozienice County =

Nowa Wola
- Village
- Location within Poland
- Coordinates: 51°41′52″N 21°14′16″E
- Country: Poland
- Voivodeship: Masovian
- County: Kozienice
- Gmina: Grabów nad Pilicą
- Population: 170

Nowa Wola [ˈnɔva ˈvɔla] is a village in the administrative district of Gmina Grabów nad Pilicą, within Kozienice County, Masovian Voivodeship, in east-central Poland.
