= Grabów Zaleśny =

- Village
- Location within Poland
- Coordinates: 51°45′N 21°13′E
- Country: Poland
- Voivodeship: Masovian
- County: Kozienice
- Gmina: Grabów nad Pilicą
- Population: 50

Grabów Zaleśny [ˈɡrabuf zaˈlɛɕnɨ] is a village in the administrative district of Gmina Grabów nad Pilicą, within Kozienice County, Masovian Voivodeship, in east-central Poland.

The village has a population of 50 people.
