= Wola Chodkowska =

- Village
- Location within Poland
- Coordinates: 51°40′N 21°24′E
- Country: Poland
- Voivodeship: Masovian
- County: Kozienice
- Gmina: Kozienice

Wola Chodkowska [ˈvɔla xɔtˈkɔfska] is a village in the administrative district of Gmina Kozienice, within Kozienice County, Masovian Voivodeship, in east-central Poland.
