= Staszów, Masovian Voivodeship =

Staszów
- Village
- Location within Poland
- Coordinates: 51°34′8″N 21°38′39″E
- Country: Poland
- Voivodeship: Masovian
- County: Kozienice
- Gmina: Kozienice
- Population (approx.): 200

Staszów [ˈstaʂuf] is a village in the administrative district of Gmina Kozienice, within Kozienice County, Masovian Voivodeship, in east-central Poland.
