= Łuczynów, Kozienice County =

Łuczynów
- Village
- Location within Poland
- Coordinates: 51°36′16″N 21°29′42″E
- Country: Poland
- Voivodeship: Masovian
- County: Kozienice
- Gmina: Kozienice
- Population (approx.): 700

Łuczynów [wuˈt͡ʂɨnuf] is a village in the administrative district of Gmina Kozienice, within Kozienice County, Masovian Voivodeship, in east-central Poland.
