= Strzyżyna =

- Village
- Location within Poland
- Coordinates: 51°41′10″N 21°12′26″E
- Country: Poland
- Voivodeship: Masovian
- County: Kozienice
- Gmina: Grabów nad Pilicą
- Population: 100

Strzyżyna [stʂɨˈʐɨna] is a village in the administrative district of Gmina Grabów nad Pilicą, within Kozienice County, Masovian Voivodeship, in east-central Poland.
