= Kociołki =

Kociołki may refer to the following places:

- Kociołki, Piotrków County in Łódź Voivodeship (central Poland)
- Kociołki, Sieradz County in Łódź Voivodeship (central Poland)
- Kociołki, Podlaskie Voivodeship (north-east Poland)
- Kociołki, Masovian Voivodeship (east-central Poland)
- Kociołki, Warmian-Masurian Voivodeship (north Poland)
