= Wilczkowice Górne, Masovian Voivodeship =

Wilczkowice Górne
- Village
- Location within Poland
- Coordinates: 51°41′4″N 21°27′16″E
- Country: Poland
- Voivodeship: Masovian
- County: Kozienice
- Gmina: Kozienice

Wilczkowice Górne [vilt͡ʂkɔˈvit͡sɛ ˈɡurnɛ] is a village in the administrative district of Gmina Kozienice, within Kozienice County, Masovian Voivodeship, in east-central Poland.
