= Opatkowice, Masovian Voivodeship =

Opatkowice
- Village
- Location within Poland
- Coordinates: 51°36′53″N 21°31′20″E
- Country: Poland
- Voivodeship: Masovian
- County: Kozienice
- Gmina: Kozienice

Opatkowice [ɔpatkɔˈvit͡sɛ] is a village in the administrative district of Gmina Kozienice, within Kozienice County, Masovian Voivodeship, in east-central Poland.
