= Ruda, Kozienice County =

Ruda
- Village
- Location within Poland
- Coordinates: 51°32′53″N 21°35′27″E
- Country: Poland
- Voivodeship: Masovian
- County: Kozienice
- Gmina: Kozienice

Ruda [ˈruda] is a village in the administrative district of Gmina Kozienice, within Kozienice County, Masovian Voivodeship, in east-central Poland.
