= Brzeźnica, Masovian Voivodeship =

Brzeźnica
- Village
- Location within Poland
- Coordinates: 51°33′16″N 21°38′12″E
- Country: Poland
- Voivodeship: Masovian
- County: Kozienice
- Gmina: Kozienice

Brzeźnica [bʐɛʑˈnit͡sa] is a village in the administrative district of Gmina Kozienice, within Kozienice County, Masovian Voivodeship, in east-central Poland.
