= Battle of Bogucin =

Battle part of the Civil War in Poland (1273–1274)

- Part of Civil war in Poland (1273–1274) and Feudal fragmentation of Poland (1138–1320)
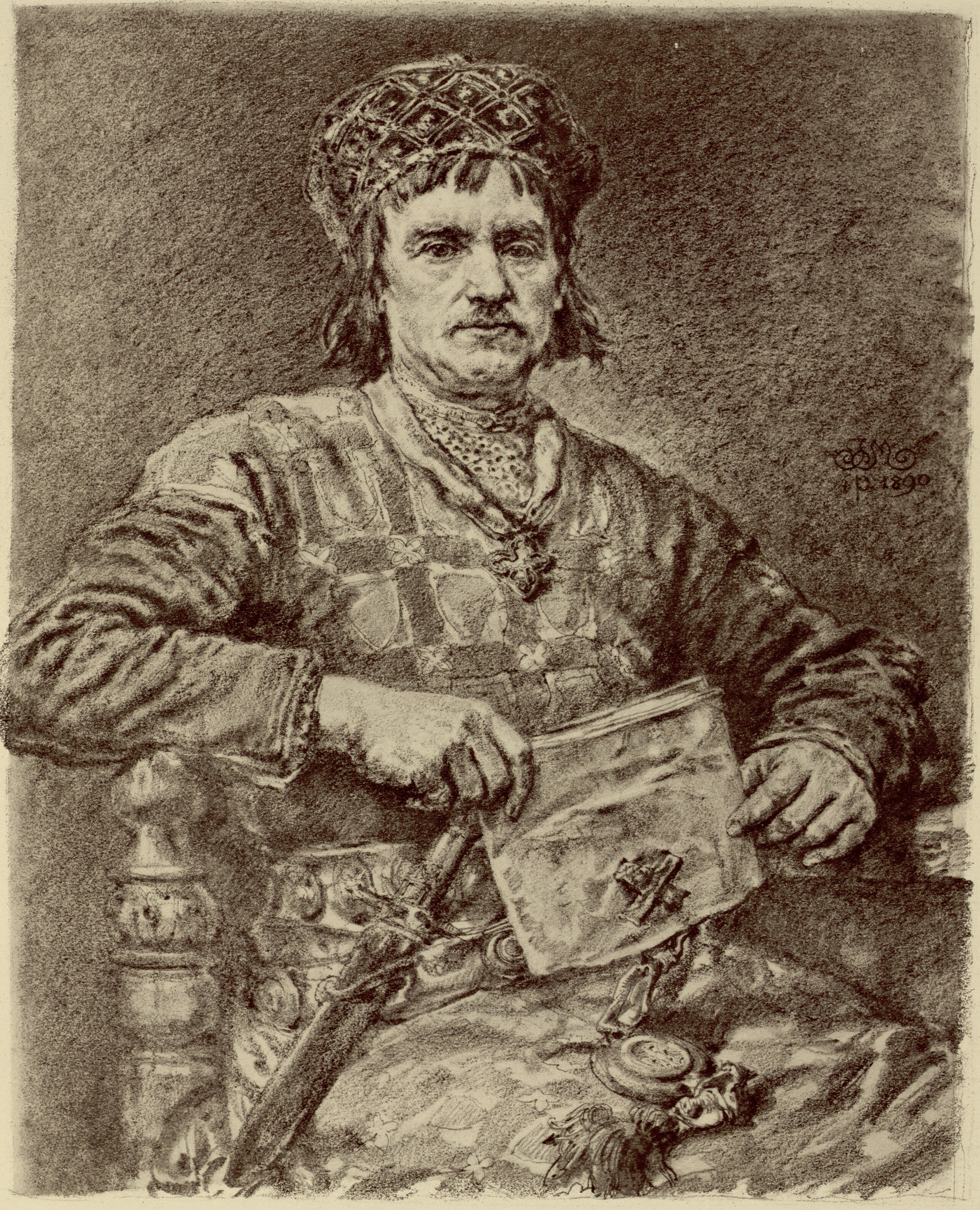
- Bolesław V the Chaste
Date	2 June 1273
Location	Bogucin, near Olkusz
Result	Victory for Bolesław

Belligerents
Kingdom of Poland	Lesser Poland

Commanders and leaders
Bolesław V the Chaste	Vladislaus I of Opole

Units involved
Bolesław–loyal army	Opole–Racibórz knights

The Battle of Bogucin took place on the 2nd of June 1273 near Bogucin, not far away from Olkusz. It was part of the Civil war in Poland (1273–1274), fought between the Kingdom of Poland led by Bolesław V the Chaste against the Lesser Poland rebels led by Vladislaus I of Opole. It resulted in a Bolesław–loyal victory.

== Prelude ==
In 1273, a civil war in Poland erupted due to the dispute over the Duchy of Kraków between the ruler at the time Bolesław V the Chaste and the pretending to be Prince of Opole, Vladislaus along with Bishop Paweł of Przemanków.

It happened because Bolesław the Chaste did not have any children from his relationship with Kinga as this relationship was "non consummatum". Bolesław therefore decided to hand over power over the most important district of Kraków to Prince Leszek of Sieradz. Other sources saw the reason for the conspiracy in the hunting passion of the Duke of Kraków, which resulted in damage to crops and forced his subjects to participate in the hunt. Some of the nobility was against this, with the rebels putting Vladislaus up as a candidate for the throne of Kraków and a rebellion starting, led by Paweł of Przemanków.

It is likely that King Ottokar II of Bohemia was himself the political initiator of the change on the Kraków throne, as removing Bolesław the Chaste from the throne of Kraków and replacing him with Vladislaus I of Opole was very convenient for the Czech king. The main event of this civil war was the Battle of Bogucin.

== Battle ==
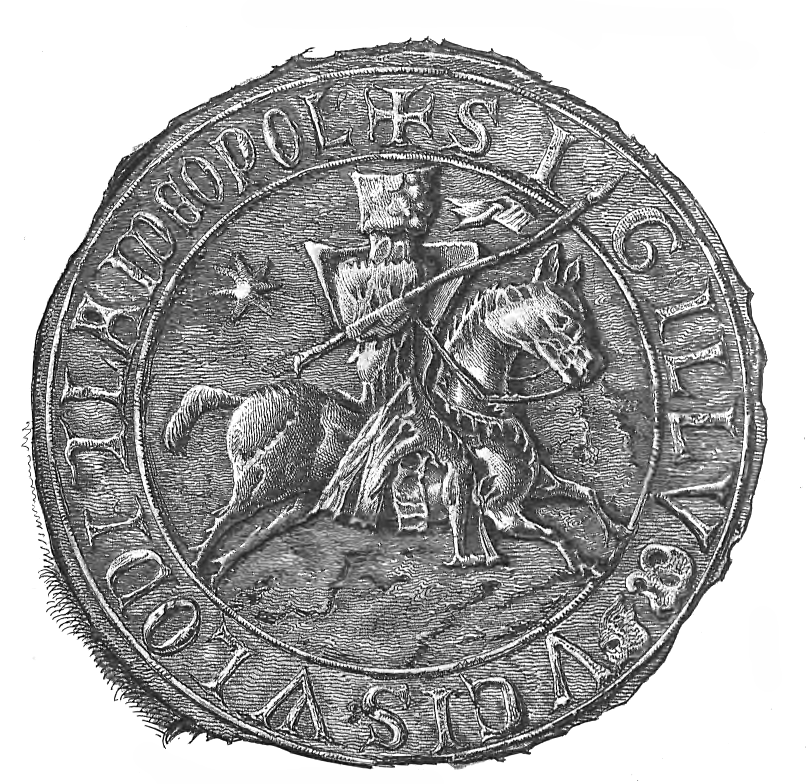
Seal of Vladislaus I of Opole

The Silesian army's attack was heading towards Opole with the intention of joining troops with the Prince of Opole, although it was stopped by Bolesław's knights near Bogucin, not far away from Olkusz. Another source says that the rebel troops had already managed to reach the bishop's town of Sławków, which was ruled by Paweł of Przemanków, or even Opole, successfully uniting with the troops of the Duke of Opole. This battle had resulted in a defeat for the Silesian rebels.

== Aftermath ==
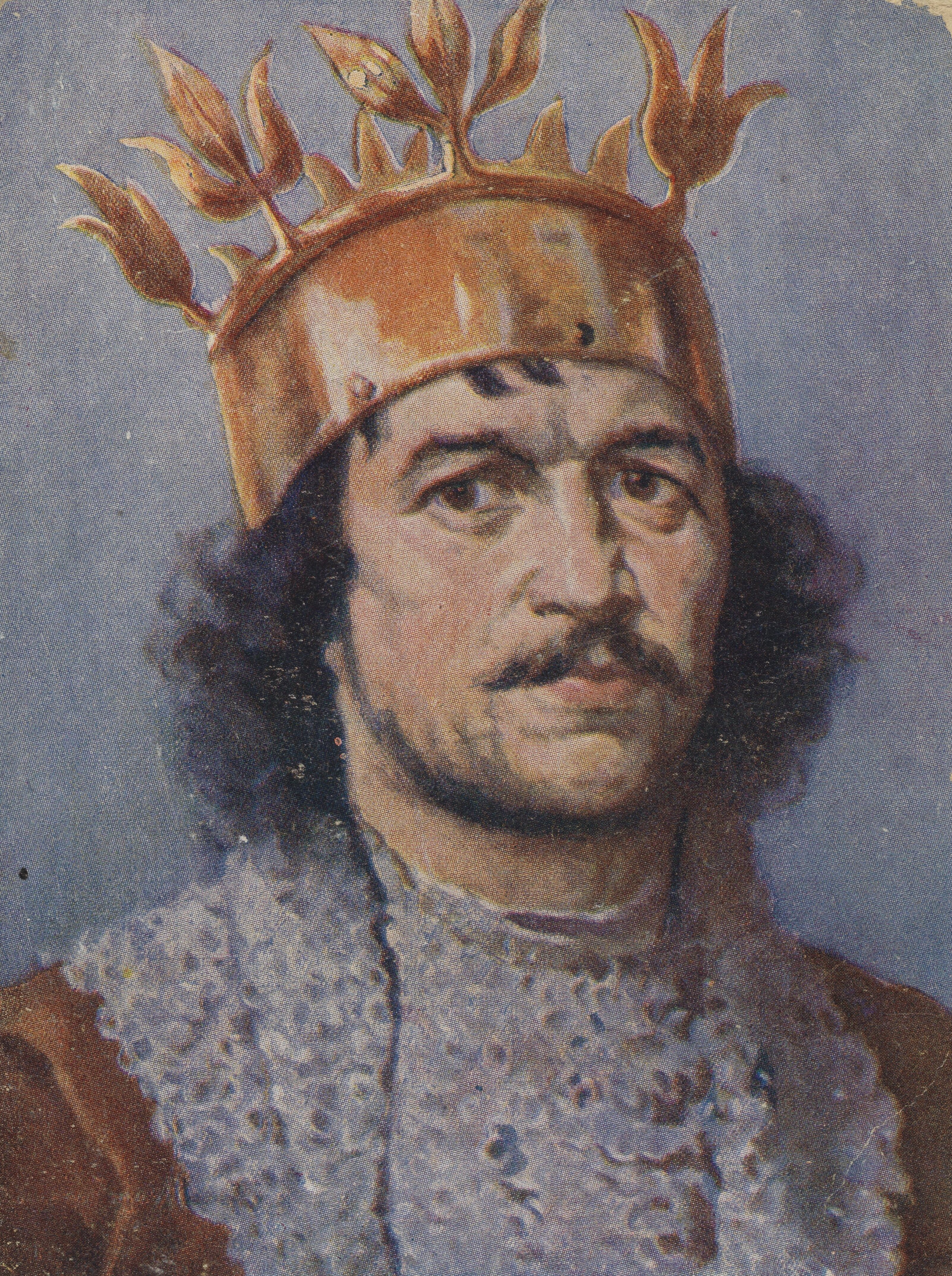
Leszek the Black (Jan Matejko)

After the battle, the prince's reprisals against the rebels took place, however, it was limited to the confiscation of goods due to the support given to them by the Bishop of Kraków, Paweł of Przemanków.

A retaliatory expedition commanded by the Duke of Kraków of the Lesser Poland inhabitants to Silesia happened in October of that year, with the participation of allied troops from Greater Poland and Sieradz and supported by Leszek the Black and Konrad II of Masovia. It was limited to the destruction of the principality along the route of the troops' march through Opole, Koźle and Racibórz.

Peace with Vladislaus was concluded the following year. For the price of a slight adjustment of the borders (the exchange of Chrzanów for the areas between Skawa and Skawinka), each of the princes remained on their own, with the prince of Opole and Racibórz renouncing his claims to the throne of Kraków.

== Legacy ==
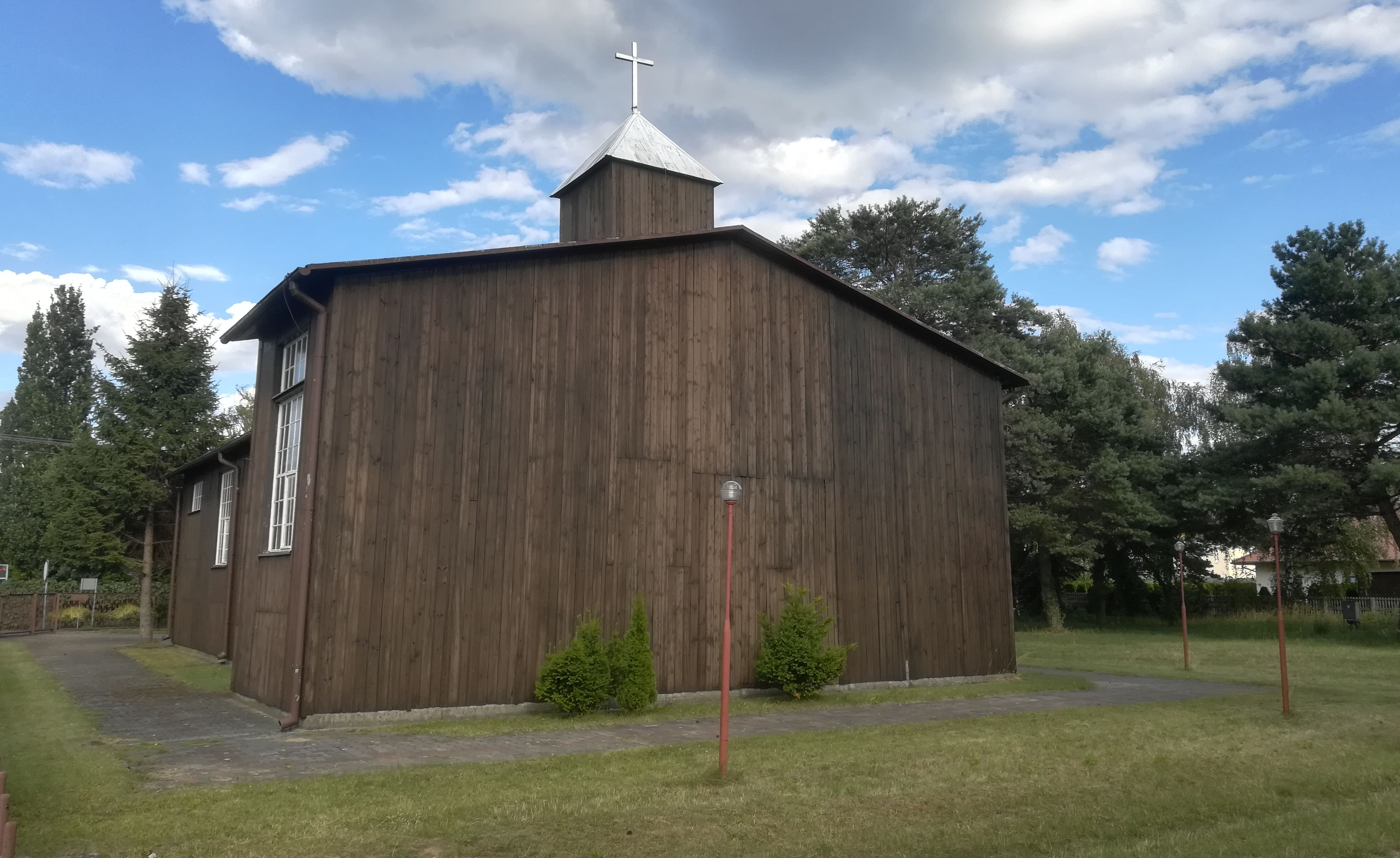
Chapel in modern–day Bogucin

Around the 6th of June 2017, there was an event to mark the 790th anniversary of Bogucin's creation. The staging of the battle was recreated, along with performances by the Rural Women's Circle, the chance to taste local dishes and buy preserves.

On 6 May 2023 (at 12pm), an event hosted by "Around Culture" was held in which there was a two-day long tournament between 30 knights to commemorate the 750th anniversary of the defeat of the rebellious Lesser Poland nobles. The entire project was addressed to the inhabitants of Dąbrowa County and guests from neighboring counties.

== See also ==
- Feudal fragmentation of Poland
