= Celinów, Kozienice County =

Celinów
- Village
- Location within Poland
- Coordinates: 51°42′16″N 21°20′12″E
- Country: Poland
- Voivodeship: Masovian
- County: Kozienice
- Gmina: Grabów nad Pilicą
- Population: 120

Celinów [t͡sɛˈlinuf] is a village in the administrative district of Gmina Grabów nad Pilicą, within Kozienice County, Masovian Voivodeship, in east-central Poland.
