= Kępeczki =

- Village
- Location within Poland
- Coordinates: 51°34′58″N 21°38′47″E
- Country: Poland
- Voivodeship: Masovian
- County: Kozienice
- Gmina: Kozienice
- Population: 120

Kępeczki [kɛmˈpɛt͡ʂki] is a village in the administrative district of Gmina Kozienice, within Kozienice County, Masovian Voivodeship, in east-central Poland.
