= Grabina, Kozienice County =

Grabina
- Village
- Location within Poland
- Coordinates: 51°43′16″N 21°14′43″E
- Country: Poland
- Voivodeship: Masovian
- County: Kozienice
- Gmina: Grabów nad Pilicą
- Population: 110

Grabina [ɡraˈbina] is a village in the administrative district of Gmina Grabów nad Pilicą, within Kozienice County, Masovian Voivodeship, in east-central Poland.
