= Kuźmy, Masovian Voivodeship =

Kuźmy
- Village
- Location within Poland
- Coordinates: 51°38′54″N 21°32′59″E
- Country: Poland
- Voivodeship: Masovian
- County: Kozienice
- Gmina: Kozienice

Kuźmy [ˈkuʑmɨ] is a village in the administrative district of Gmina Kozienice, within Kozienice County, Masovian Voivodeship, in east-central Poland.
