= Utniki =

- Village
- Location within Poland
- Coordinates: 51°43′6″N 21°15′36″E
- Country: Poland
- Voivodeship: Masovian
- County: Kozienice
- Gmina: Grabów nad Pilicą
- Population: 90

Utniki [utˈniki] is a village in the administrative district of Gmina Grabów nad Pilicą, within Kozienice County, Masovian Voivodeship, in east-central Poland.
