= Psary, Kozienice County =

Psary
- Village
- Location within Poland
- Coordinates: 51°33′33″N 21°37′14″E
- Country: Poland
- Voivodeship: Masovian
- County: Kozienice
- Gmina: Kozienice

Psary [ˈpsarɨ] is a village in the administrative district of Gmina Kozienice, within Kozienice County, Masovian Voivodeship, in east-central Poland.
