= Michałówka, Kozienice County =

Michałówka
- Village
- Location within Poland
- Coordinates: 51°40′8″N 21°26′33″E
- Country: Poland
- Voivodeship: Masovian
- County: Kozienice
- Gmina: Kozienice

Michałówka [mixaˈwufka] is a village in the administrative district of Gmina Kozienice, within Kozienice County, Masovian Voivodeship, in east-central Poland.
