= Holendry Kozienickie =

- Village
- Location within Poland
- Coordinates: 51°36′21″N 21°36′9″E
- Country: Poland
- Voivodeship: Masovian
- County: Kozienice
- Gmina: Kozienice

Holendry Kozienickie [xɔˈlɛndrɨ kɔʑɛˈnit͡skʲɛ] is a village in the administrative district of Gmina Kozienice, within Kozienice County, Masovian Voivodeship, in east-central Poland.
