= Wymysłów, Kozienice County =

Wymysłów
- Village
- Location within Poland
- Coordinates: 51°36′N 21°34′E
- Country: Poland
- Voivodeship: Masovian
- County: Kozienice
- Gmina: Kozienice
- Population: 70

Wymysłów [vɨˈmɨswuf] is a village in the administrative district of Gmina Kozienice, within Kozienice County, Masovian Voivodeship, in east-central Poland.
