= Wysokie Koło =

- Village
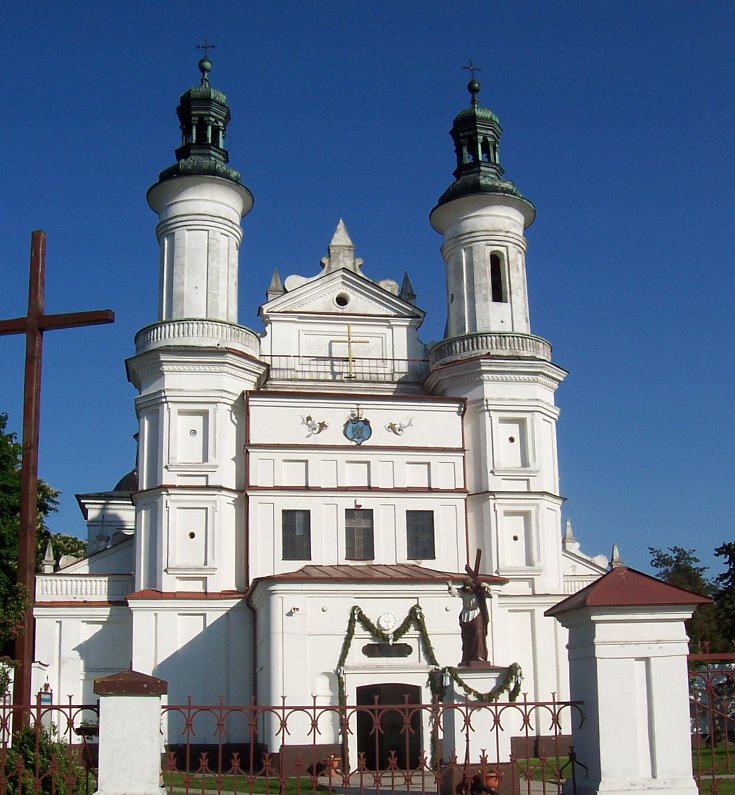
- Queen of the Holy Rosary church

- Location within Poland
- Coordinates: 51°28′N 21°50′E
- Country: Poland
- Voivodeship: Masovian
- Powiat: Kozienice
- Gmina: Gniewoszów
- Sołectwo: Wysokie Koło
- Time zone: UTC+1 (CET)
  - Summer (DST): UTC+2 (CEST)
- Postal code: 26-920
- Phone area code(s) (within Poland): 48 xxx xx xx
- Car plate(s): WKZ

Wysokie Koło [vɨˈsɔkʲɛ ˈkɔwɔ] is a village in the administrative district of Gmina Gniewoszów, within Kozienice County, Masovian Voivodeship, in east-central Poland.
