= Dziecinów =

Dziecinów is the name of two villages in Masovian Voivodeship, Poland:

- Dziecinów, Kozienice County
- Dziecinów, Otwock County
