= Badowski =

Badowski may refer to:

- Henry Badowski (born 1958), a British musician
- Kazimierz Badowski (1907-1990), a Polish communist activist
