= Aleksandrówka, Kozienice County =

Aleksandrówka
- Village
- Location within Poland
- Coordinates: 51°34′14″N 21°32′25″E
- Country: Poland
- Voivodeship: Masovian
- County: Kozienice
- Gmina: Kozienice

Aleksandrówka [alɛksanˈdrufka] is a village in the administrative district of Gmina Kozienice, within Kozienice County, Masovian Voivodeship, in east-central Poland.
