= Gniewoszów, Masovian Voivodeship =

Gniewoszów
- Village
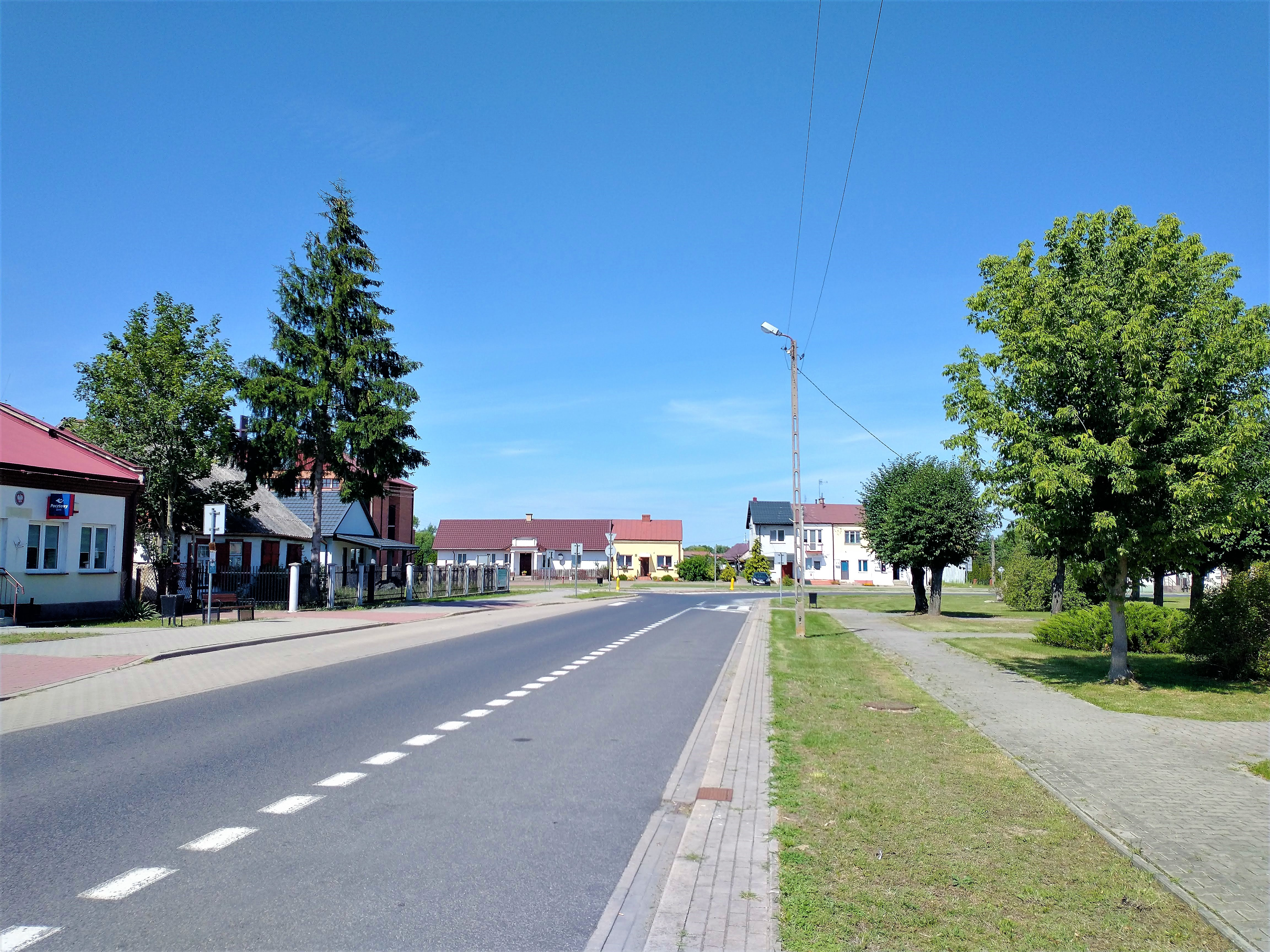
- Centre of Gniewoszów

- Coat of arms

- Location within Poland
- Coordinates: 51°28′27″N 21°48′44″E
- Country: Poland
- Voivodeship: Masovian
- County: Kozienice
- Gmina: Gniewoszów
- Founded: 1693
- Founder: Jan Kazimierz Gniewosz

Government
  - Wójt: Stefan Marek Banaś

Population
  - Total: 670
- Time zone: UTC+1 (CET)
  - Summer (DST): UTC+2 (CEST)
- Postal code: 26-920
- Phone area code(s) (within Poland): 48 xxx xx xx
- Car plates: WKZ

Gniewoszów [ɡɲɛˈvɔʂuf] is a village in Kozienice County, Masovian Voivodeship, in east-central Poland. It is the seat of the gmina (administrative district) called Gmina Gniewoszów.

== History ==
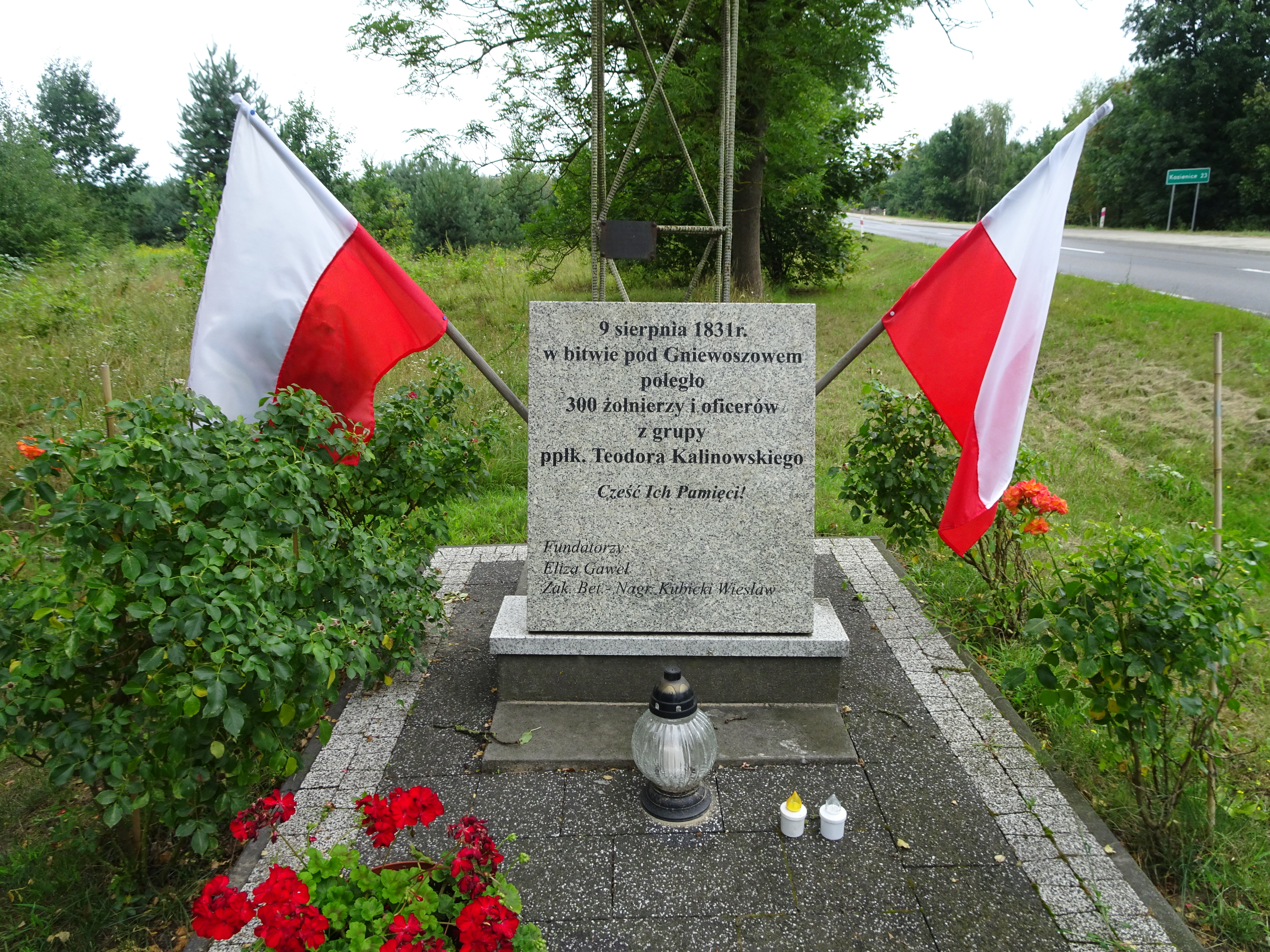
Battle of Gniewoszów (1831) memorial

Gniewoszów was founded in 1693 by Jan Kazimierz Gniewosz, podstoli of Sandomierz, on territory of the village of Oleksów. In 1712 King Augustus II the Strong established four annual fairs. Later on, it was a private town of the Szembek family.

=== History of the Jewish community ===
According to official government statistics, in 1925 the Jewish community of Gniewoszów (Yiddish: גנייבושוב) was estimated at 2,530 persons. In 1933 across the Municipality lived 2,118 Jews. In 1937 the Kehilla was made up of only 1,662 Jews. The considerable drop in population numbers was likely caused by the migration overseas. The community owned a brick synagogue, a bath house, a cheder and two cemeteries, one at Oleksowska Street, and a second one at Lubelska.

On the eve of World War II, a total of 1,580 Jews lived in the town. Gniewoszów was overrun by the Wehrmacht in mid-September 1939. Jews were ordered to wear a Star of David, and forced to perform slave labor. Before the end of 1939 Judenrat was established, with curfew and strict food rations. The Synagogue was turned into a German horse stable. The Jewish population began to grow sharply by 1940, because there was no permanent German garrison in the town and also, it laid on the Vistula, the convenient crossing point. Already by early spring of 1940 there were 2,750 Jews in the town (nearly half requiring food assistance), and by October 1940, the Jewish population exceeded 3,000. On December 22, 1941, a formal (open type) ghetto was registered by the German administration, and in spring of 1942, Jews from surrounding villages were forced to move into it. All men were required to shave their heads and beards. In August 1942 the ghetto was turned into a transit ghetto, doubling the number of Jews brought in from smaller towns (Ryczywół, Sieciechów) for the total of 6,580 inmates. On August 19–20 approximately 5,000 Jews were transferred to Zwoleń transit ghetto nearby. A few weeks later, those Jews were sent from Zwoleń to Treblinka extermination camp. Around 600 were resettled to Lublin. The remaining 1,000 Jews were murdered in Treblinka extermination camp on November 15, 1942. No more remained. The number of known Jewish Gniewoszów survivors may be around ten. At least five of the survivors were murdered by Poles when they returned to the village in summer, 1945. The film Among Neighbors by filmmaker Yoav Potash deals with the post war murders.
