= Wójtostwo, Kozienice County =

Wójtostwo
- Village
- Location within Poland
- Coordinates: 51°35′54″N 21°34′31″E
- Country: Poland
- Voivodeship: Masovian
- County: Kozienice
- Gmina: Kozienice

Wójtostwo [vui̯ˈtɔstfɔ] is a village in the administrative district of Gmina Kozienice, within Kozienice County, Masovian Voivodeship, in east-central Poland.
