= Nowa Wieś, Kozienice County =

Nowa Wieś
- Village
- Location within Poland
- Coordinates: 51°38′18″N 21°29′32″E
- Country: Poland
- Voivodeship: Masovian
- County: Kozienice
- Gmina: Kozienice

Nowa Wieś [ˈnɔva ˈvjɛɕ] is a village in the administrative district of Gmina Kozienice, within Kozienice County, Masovian Voivodeship, in east-central Poland.
