= Brzozówka, Kozienice County =

Brzozówka
- Village
- Location within Poland
- Coordinates: 51°42′52″N 21°12′41″E
- Country: Poland
- Voivodeship: Masovian
- County: Kozienice
- Gmina: Grabów nad Pilicą
- Population: 272

Brzozówka [bʐɔˈzufka] is a village in the administrative district of Gmina Grabów nad Pilicą, within Kozienice County, Masovian Voivodeship, in east-central Poland.
