= Molendy =

- Village
- Location within Poland
- Coordinates: 51°30′38″N 21°36′17″E
- Country: Poland
- Voivodeship: Masovian
- Powiat: Kozienice
- Gmina: Garbatka-Letnisko
- Sołectwo: Molendy
- Established: 18th century

Government
  - Wójt: Tadeusz Molenda
- Population (2003): 225
- Time zone: UTC+1 (CET)
  - Summer (DST): UTC+2 (CEST)
- Postal code: 26-930
- Phone area code(s) (within Poland): 48 xxx xx xx
- Car plate(s): WKZ

Molendy [mɔˈlɛndɨ] is a village in the administrative district of Gmina Garbatka-Letnisko, within Kozienice County, Masovian Voivodeship, in east-central Poland.

== History ==
Village was founded at the end of the 18th century with a combination of rural Krępce and Wola Józefowska.

On April 7, 1944 BCH and AK troops under the command of "Thomas" and "Gryf, in a village surrounded by prevailing German forces, began fierce battle to exit the lap. It was the biggest partisan battle in the whole circumference in Kozienice County during World War II. On July 22, 1944, the Nazis murdered 10 men in the village.
