= Kępa Wólczyńska =

- Village
- Location within Poland
- Coordinates: 51°36′13″N 21°37′33″E
- Country: Poland
- Voivodeship: Masovian
- County: Kozienice
- Gmina: Kozienice

Kępa Wólczyńska [ˈkɛmpa vulˈt͡ʂɨɲska] is a village in the administrative district of Gmina Kozienice, within Kozienice County, Masovian Voivodeship, in east-central Poland.
