= Zwierzyniec, Kozienice County =

Zwierzyniec
- Village
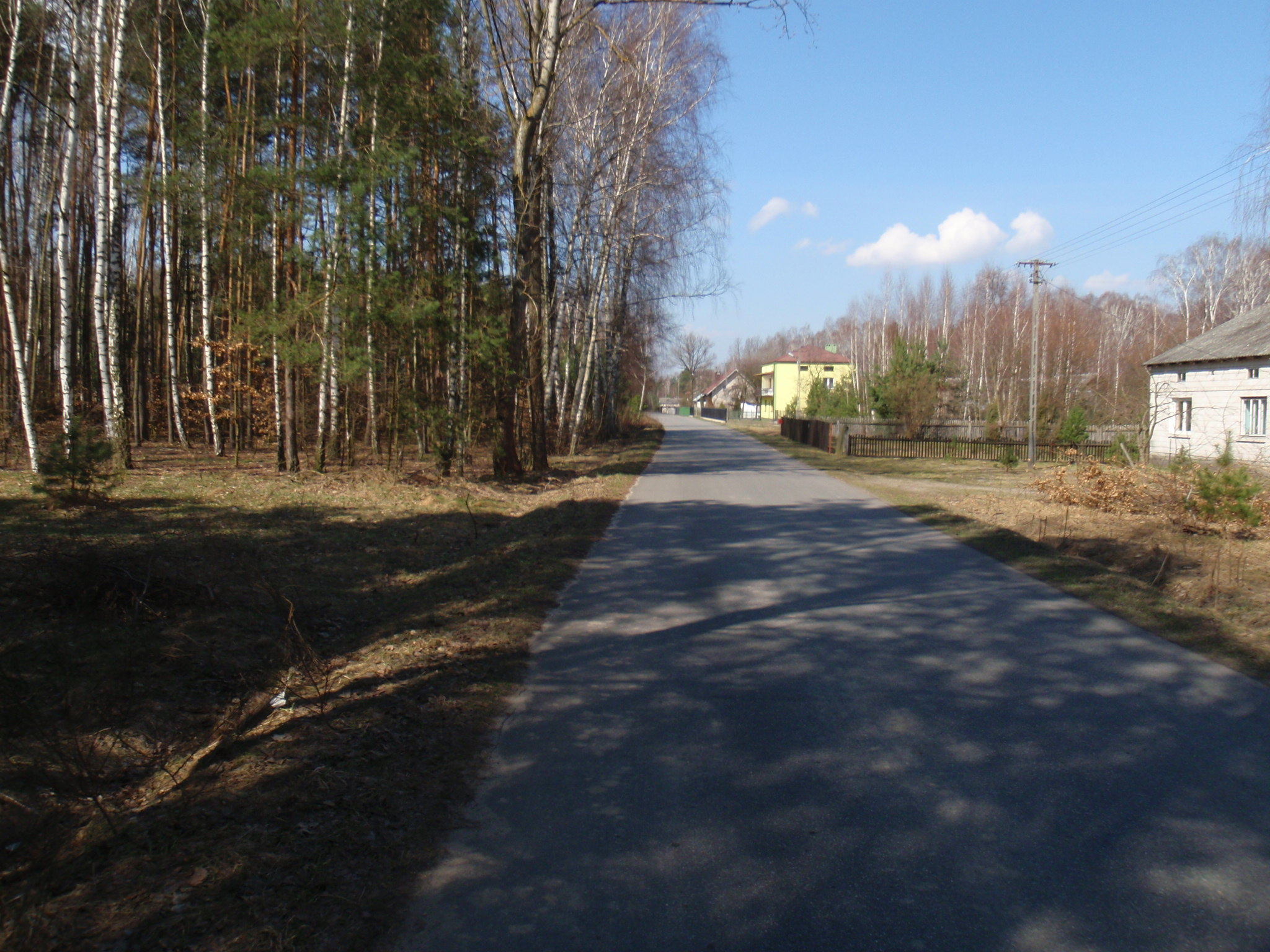

- Location within Poland
- Coordinates: 51°42′38″N 21°14′12″E
- Country: Poland
- Voivodeship: Masovian
- County: Kozienice
- Gmina: Grabów nad Pilicą
- Population: 80

Zwierzyniec (Polish pronunciation: [zvjɛˈʐɨɲɛt͡s]) is a village in the administrative district of Gmina Grabów nad Pilicą, within Kozienice County, Masovian Voivodeship, in east-central Poland.
