= Janów, Kozienice County =

Janów
- Village
- Location within Poland
- Coordinates: 51°33′48″N 21°33′52″E
- Country: Poland
- Voivodeship: Masovian
- County: Kozienice
- Gmina: Kozienice

Janów [ˈjanuf] is a village in the administrative district of Gmina Kozienice, within Kozienice County, Masovian Voivodeship, in east-central Poland.
