= Garbatka-Zbyczyn =

- Village
- Location within Poland
- Coordinates: 51°28′50″N 21°40′44″E
- Country: Poland
- Voivodeship: Masovian
- Powiat: Kozienice
- Gmina: Garbatka-Letnisko
- Sołectwo: Garbatka-Zbyczyn

Government
  - Wójt: Tadeusz Molenda
- Population (2003): 229
- Time zone: UTC+1 (CET)
  - Summer (DST): UTC+2 (CEST)
- Postal code: 26-930
- Phone area code(s) (within Poland): 48 xxx xx xx
- Car plate(s): WKZ

Garbatka-Zbyczyn [ɡarˈbatka ˈzbɨt͡ʂɨn] is a village in the administrative district of Gmina Garbatka-Letnisko, within Kozienice County, Masovian Voivodeship, in east-central Poland.

== See also ==
Garbatka, Garbatka Długa, Garbatka-Dziewiątka, Garbatka-Letnisko
