= Zakrzew, Kozienice County =

Zakrzew
- Village
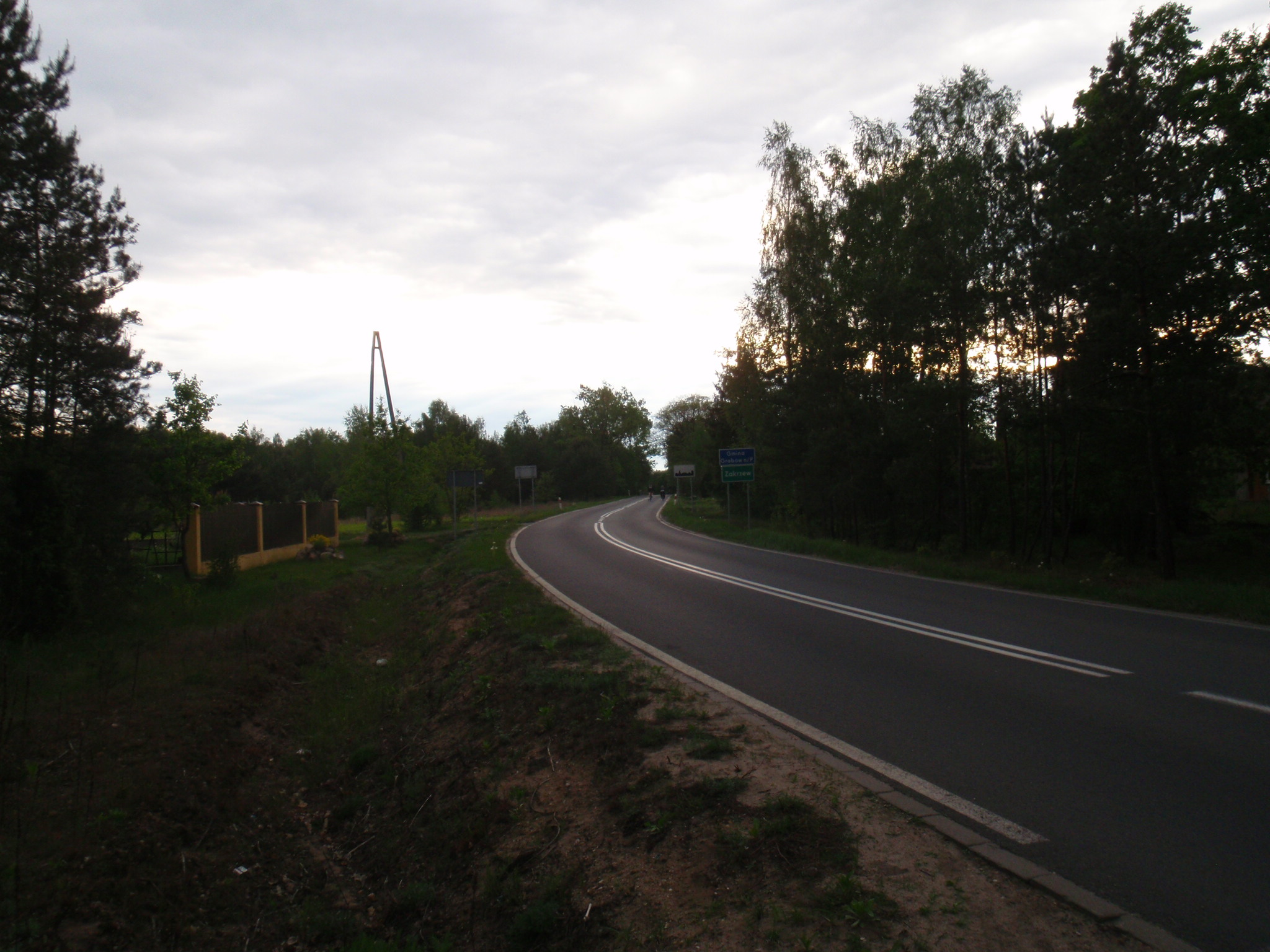

- Location within Poland
- Coordinates: 51°47′7″N 21°14′44″E
- Country: Poland
- Voivodeship: Masovian
- County: Kozienice
- Gmina: Grabów nad Pilicą
- Population: 100

Zakrzew [ˈzakʂɛf] is a village in the administrative district of Gmina Grabów nad Pilicą, within Kozienice County, Masovian Voivodeship, in east-central Poland.
