= Stanisławice, Masovian Voivodeship =

Stanisławice
- Village
- Location within Poland
- Coordinates: 51°34′19″N 21°28′51″E
- Country: Poland
- Voivodeship: Masovian
- County: Kozienice
- Gmina: Kozienice
- Population: 1,100

Stanisławice [staniswaˈvit͡sɛ] is a village in the administrative district of Gmina Kozienice, within Kozienice County, Masovian Voivodeship, in east-central Poland.
