= Boguszówka =

Boguszówka may refer to any of the following places in Poland:

- Boguszówka, Masovian Voivodeship, a village in Gmina Gniewoszów, Kozienice County
- Boguszówka, Podkarpackie Voivodeship, a village in Gmina Bircza, Przemyśl County
