= Koziołek, Masovian Voivodeship =

Koziołek
- Village
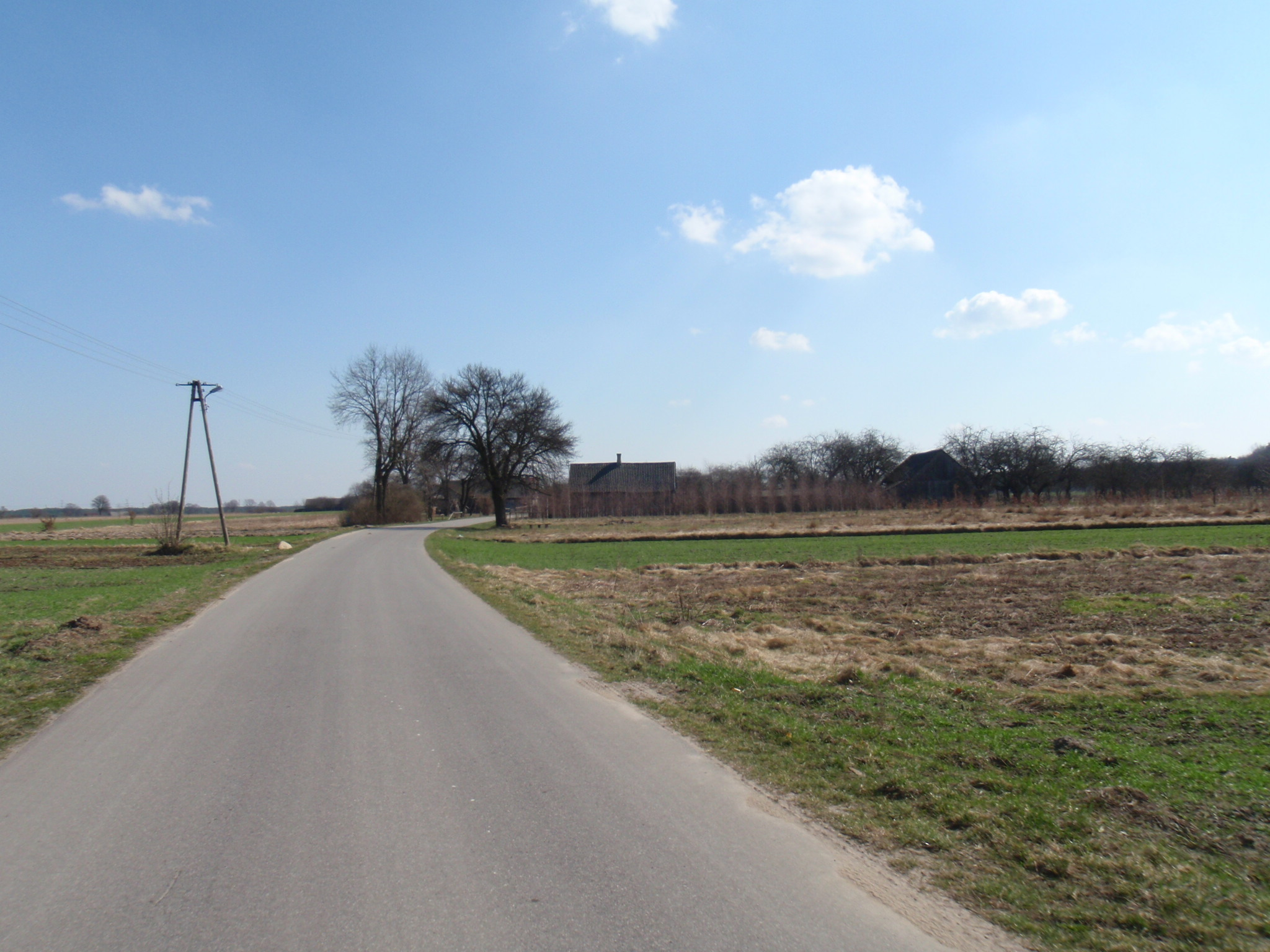

- Location within Poland
- Coordinates: 51°42′N 21°16′E
- Country: Poland
- Voivodeship: Masovian
- County: Kozienice
- Gmina: Grabów nad Pilicą
- Population: 90

Koziołek [kɔˈʑɔwɛk] is a village in the administrative district of Gmina Grabów nad Pilicą, within Kozienice County, Masovian Voivodeship, in east-central Poland.
