= Mieścisko, Masovian Voivodeship =

Mieścisko
- Village
- Location within Poland
- Coordinates: 51°28′00″N 21°50′00″E
- Country: Poland
- Voivodeship: Masovian
- County: Kozienice
- Gmina: Gniewoszów

Mieścisko [mjɛɕˈt͡ɕiskɔ] is a village in the administrative district of Gmina Gniewoszów, within Kozienice County, Masovian Voivodeship, in east-central Poland.
