= Augustów, Kozienice County =

Augustów
- Village
- Location within Poland
- Coordinates: 51°41′19″N 21°10′29″E
- Country: Poland
- Voivodeship: Masovian
- County: Kozienice
- Gmina: Grabów nad Pilicą
- Population: 400

Augustów [auˈɡustuf] is a village in the administrative district of Gmina Grabów nad Pilicą, within Kozienice County, Masovian Voivodeship, in east-central Poland.
