= Łaszówka =

- Village
- Location within Poland
- Coordinates: 51°39′N 21°24′E
- Country: Poland
- Voivodeship: Masovian
- County: Kozienice
- Gmina: Kozienice

Łaszówka [waˈʂufka] is a village in the administrative district of Gmina Kozienice, within Kozienice County, Masovian Voivodeship, in east-central Poland.
