= Dąbrówki, Gmina Grabów nad Pilicą =

Dąbrówki
- Village
- Location within Poland
- Coordinates: 51°41′58″N 21°10′54″E
- Country: Poland
- Voivodeship: Masovian
- County: Kozienice
- Gmina: Grabów nad Pilicą
- Population: 60

Dąbrówki (Polish pronunciation: [dɔmˈbrufkʲi]) is a village in the administrative district of Gmina Grabów nad Pilicą, within Kozienice County, Masovian Voivodeship, in east-central Poland.
