= Markowola-Kolonia =

- Village
- Location within Poland
- Coordinates: 51°28′0″N 21°50′0″E
- Country: Poland
- Voivodeship: Masovian
- County: Kozienice
- Gmina: Gniewoszów

Markowola-Kolonia [markɔˈvɔla kɔˈlɔɲa] is a village in the administrative district of Gmina Gniewoszów, within Kozienice County, Masovian Voivodeship, in east-central Poland.
