= Kociołek (disambiguation) =

Kociołek is a village in the Masovian Voivodeship, east-central Poland. It may also refer to:

- Kociołek Szlachecki, a village in the Warmian-Masurian Voivodeship, north-eastern Poland
- Stanisław Kociołek (1933–2015), Polish politician
