= Gmina Kozienice =

Gmina Kozienice Kozienice Commune
- Gmina
- Coat of arms
- Interactive map of Gmina Kozienice
- Coordinates (Kozienice): 51°35′N 21°34′E
- Country: Poland
- Voivodeship: Masovian
- County: Kozienice
- Seat: Kozienice

Area
  - Total: 245.56 km^{2} (94.81 sq mi)

Population (2006)
  - Total: 30,270
  - Density: 123.3/km^{2} (319.3/sq mi)
  - Urban: 18,541
  - Rural: 11,729
- Website: http://www.kozienice.pl/

Gmina Kozienice is an urban-rural gmina (administrative district) in Kozienice County, Masovian Voivodeship, in east-central Poland. Its seat is the town of Kozienice, which lies approximately 81 kilometres (50 mi) south-east of Warsaw.

The gmina covers an area of 245.56 square kilometres (94.8 sq mi), and as of 2006 its total population is 30,270 (out of which the population of Kozienice amounts to 18,541, and the population of the rural part of the gmina is 11,729).

== Villages ==
Apart from the town of Kozienice, Gmina Kozienice contains the villages and settlements of Aleksandrówka, Brzeźnica, Budy, Chinów, Cudów, Cztery Kopce, Dąbrówki, Holendry Kozienickie, Holendry Kuźmińskie, Janików, Janików-Folwark, Janów, Katarzynów, Kępa Bielańska, Kępa Wólczyńska, Kępeczki, Kociołki, Kuźmy, Łaszówka, Łuczynów, Majdany, Michałówka, Nowa Wieś, Nowiny, Opatkowice, Piotrkowice, Przewóz, Psary, Ruda, Samwodzie, Selwanówka, Śmietanki, Stanisławice, Staszów, Świerże Górne, Wilczkowice Górne, Wójtostwo, Wola Chodkowska, Wólka Tyrzyńska, Wólka Tyrzyńska B and Wymysłów.

== Neighbouring gminas ==
Gmina Kozienice is bordered by the gminas of Garbatka-Letnisko, Głowaczów, Maciejowice, Magnuszew, Pionki, Sieciechów and Stężyca.
