= Gmina Grabów nad Pilicą =

Gmina Grabów nad Pilicą Grabów nad Pilicą Commune
- Gmina
- Flag Coat of arms
- Interactive map of Gmina Grabów nad Pilicą
- Coordinates (Grabów nad Pilicą): 51°43′38″N 21°13′29″E
- Country: Poland
- Voivodeship: Masovian
- County: Kozienice
- Seat: Grabów nad Pilicą

Area
  - Total: 125 km^{2} (48 sq mi)

Population (2006)
  - Total: 3,692
  - Density: 29.5/km^{2} (76.5/sq mi)
- Website: http://www.grabow.pl/

Gmina Grabów nad Pilicą is a rural gmina (administrative district) in Kozienice County, Masovian Voivodeship, in east-central Poland. Its seat is the village of Grabów nad Pilicą, which lies approximately 29 kilometres (18 mi) north-west of Kozienice and 57 km (35 mi) south of Warsaw.

The gmina covers an area of 125 square kilometres (48.3 sq mi), and as of 2006 its total population is 3,692.

== Villages ==
Gmina Grabów nad Pilicą contains the villages and settlements of Augustów, Broncin, Brzozówka, Budy Augustowskie, Celinów, Cychrowska Wola, Czerwonka, Dąbrówki, Dziecinów, Edwardów, Grabina, Grabów nad Pilicą, Grabów Nowy, Grabów Zaleśny, Grabowska Wola, Kępa Niemojewska, Koziołek, Łękawica, Lipinki, Nowa Wola, Paprotnia, Strzyżyna, Tomczyn, Utniki, Wyborów, Zakrzew and Zwierzyniec.

== Neighbouring gminas ==
Gmina Grabów nad Pilicą is bordered by the gminas of Głowaczów, Magnuszew, Stromiec and Warka.
