= Kazimierz Badowski =

Polish activist

- Born: August 15, 1907; Regów Stary, Congress Poland
- Died: July 6, 1990 (aged 82); Kraków, Poland
- Resting place: Rakowicki Cemetery
- Occupation: Dockworker
- Organization: International Revolutionary Current
- Known for: Resisting Stalinism
- Political party: Communist Party of Poland
- Other political affiliations: Communist Party of Belgium
- Movement: Trotskyism
- Criminal charges: Subversion
- Criminal penalty: 3 years imprisonment
- Parents: Konrad Badowski (father); Balbina née Wosatko (mother)

Kazimierz Badowski (15 August 1907, Regów Stary – 6 July 1990) was a Polish Communist activist.

== Life ==
=== Career ===
Working as a docker in Gdańsk, he rose through the ranks of the trade union movement to become a figure in the Communist Party of Poland. In 1925, he left the party in the face of what he saw as an increasingly Stalinist ideological outlook. He became a Trotskyist, founding the International Revolutionary Current, an informal network of various anti-Stalinist, Trotskyist and other Marxist organisations. He was able to survive all of the Nazi concentration camps only to be imprisoned by Stalin in the early 1950s and again from 1962 to 1964.

He promoted Esperanto as part of the Trotskyist movement.

=== Death ===
He died in 1990, living his later years paralysed and unable to communicate.

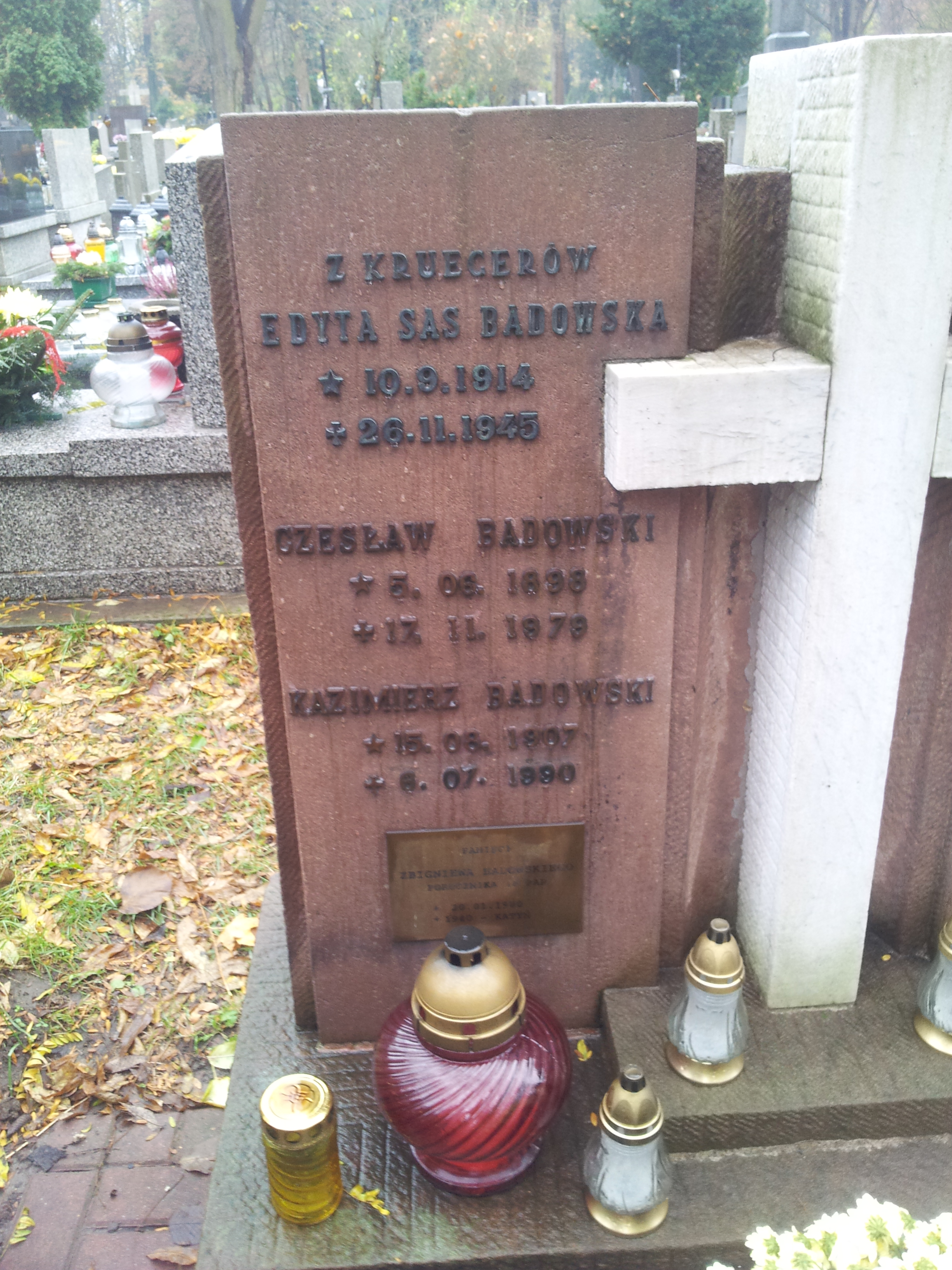
Badowski's tombstone at the Rakowicki Cemetery in Krakow
