= Gmina Gniewoszów =

- Gmina
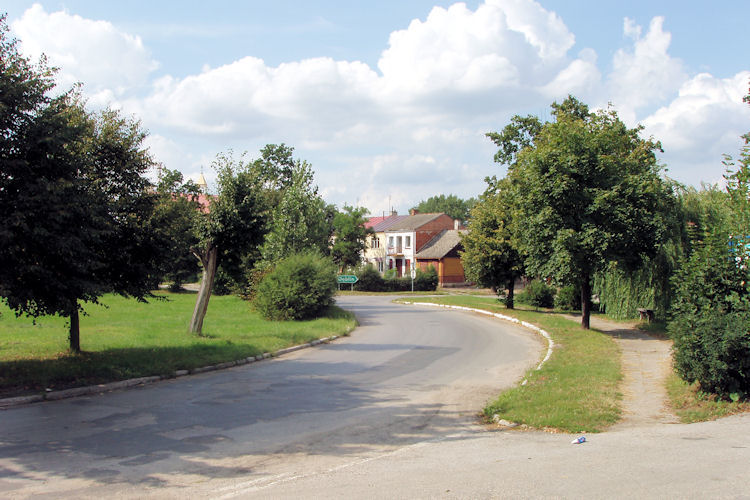
- Center of Gniewoszów

- Coat of arms
- Interactive map of Gmina Gniewoszów
- Coordinates (Gniewoszów): 51°28′27″N 21°48′44″E
- Country: Poland
- Voivodeship: Masovian
- County: Kozienice
- Seat: Gniewoszów

Government
  - Wójt: Stefan Marek Banaś

Area
  - Total: 84.29 km^{2} (32.54 sq mi)

Population (2006)
  - Total: 4,156
  - Density: 49.31/km^{2} (127.7/sq mi)
- Postal code: 26-920
- Phone area code(s) (within Poland): 48 xxx xx xx
- Car plates: WKZ
- Website: http://www.gniewoszow.pl/

Gmina Gniewoszów is a rural gmina (administrative district) in Kozienice County, Masovian Voivodeship, in east-central Poland. Its seat is the village of Gniewoszów, which lies approximately 21 kilometres (13 mi) south-east of Kozienice and 102 km (63 mi) south-east of Warsaw.

The gmina covers an area of 84.29 square kilometres (32.5 sq mi), and as of 2006 its total population is 4,156.

== Villages ==
Gmina Gniewoszów contains the villages and settlements of Boguszówka, Borek, Gniewoszów, Kociołek, Marianów, Markowola, Markowola-Kolonia, Mieścisko, Oleksów, Regów Stary, Sarnów, Sławczyn, Wólka Bachańska, Wysokie Koło, Zalesie, Zdunków and Zwola.

== Neighbouring gminas ==
Gmina Gniewoszów is bordered by the gminas of Garbatka-Letnisko, Policzna, Puławy and Sieciechów.
