= Łękawica, Kozienice County =

Łękawica
- Village
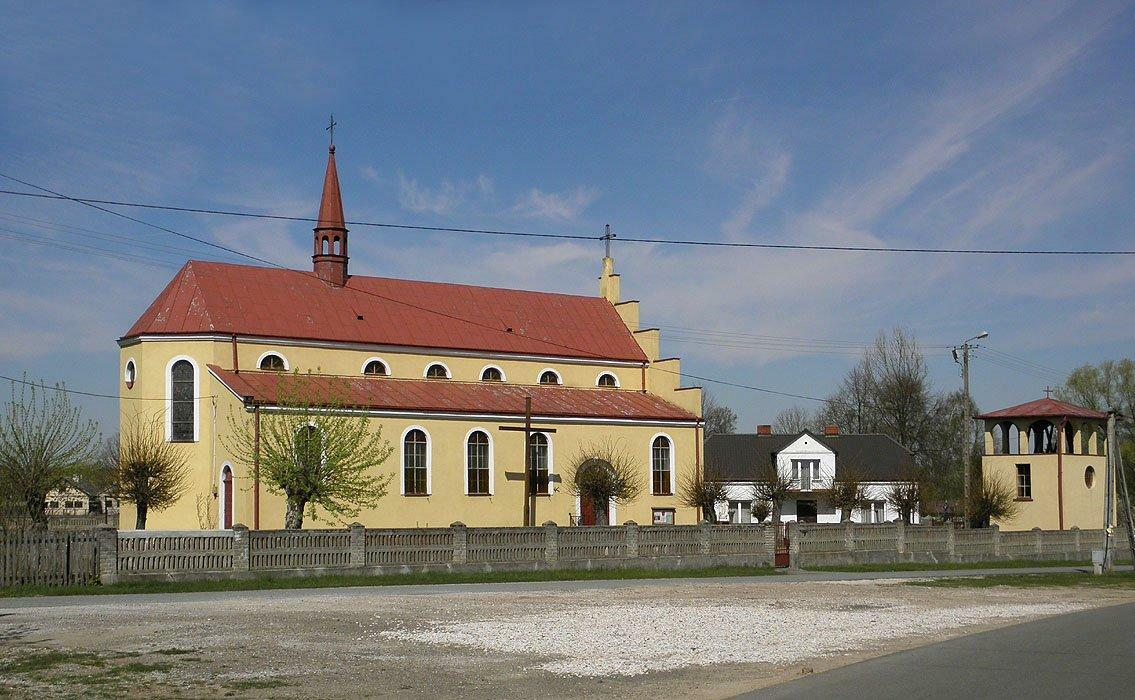

- Location within Poland
- Coordinates: 51°43′0″N 21°19′0″E
- Country: Poland
- Voivodeship: Masovian
- County: Kozienice
- Gmina: Grabów nad Pilicą

Łękawica [wɛnkaˈvit͡sa] is a village in the administrative district of Gmina Grabów nad Pilicą, within Kozienice County, Masovian Voivodeship, in east-central Poland.
