= Krępiec (river) =

Coordinates: 51°32′11″N 21°34′45″E

Location
- Country: Poland

Krępiec is a river of Poland, a tributary of the Krypianka.
