= Grabów nad Pilicą =

- Village
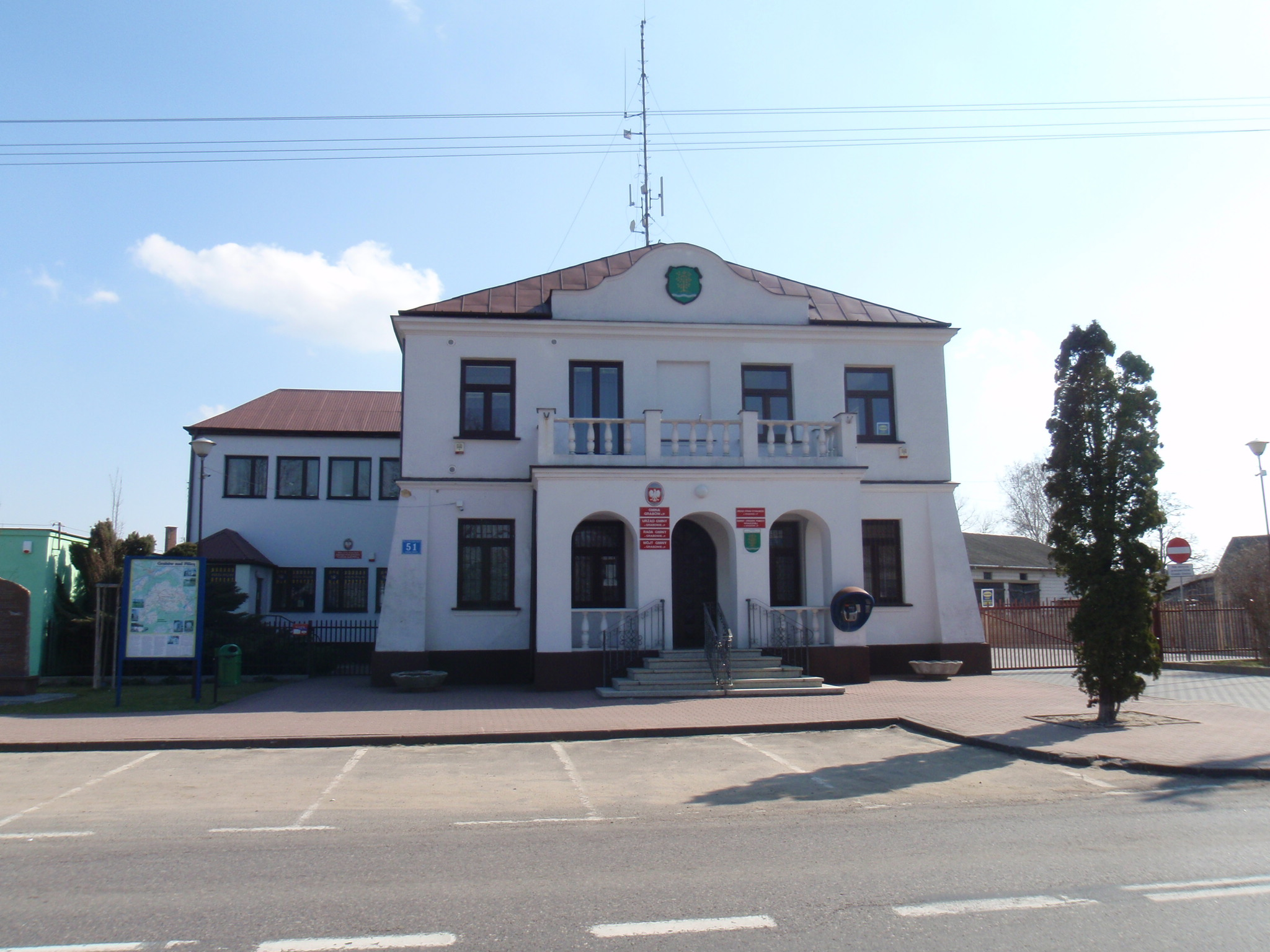
- Town hall

- Location within Poland
- Coordinates: 51°43′N 21°13′E
- Country: Poland
- Voivodeship: Masovian
- County: Kozienice
- Gmina: Grabów nad Pilicą
- Population: 460

Grabów nad Pilicą [ˈɡrabuf ˌnat piˈlit͡sɔ̃] is a village in Kozienice County, Masovian Voivodeship, in east-central Poland. It is the seat of the gmina (administrative district) called Gmina Grabów nad Pilicą.
