= Kociołki, Masovian Voivodeship =

Kociołki
- Village
- Location within Poland
- Coordinates: 51°34′N 21°35′E
- Country: Poland
- Voivodeship: Masovian
- County: Kozienice
- Gmina: Kozienice
- Population: 570

Kociołki [kɔˈt͡ɕɔu̯ki] is a village in the administrative district of Gmina Kozienice, within Kozienice County, Masovian Voivodeship, in east-central Poland.
