= Oleksów =

- Village
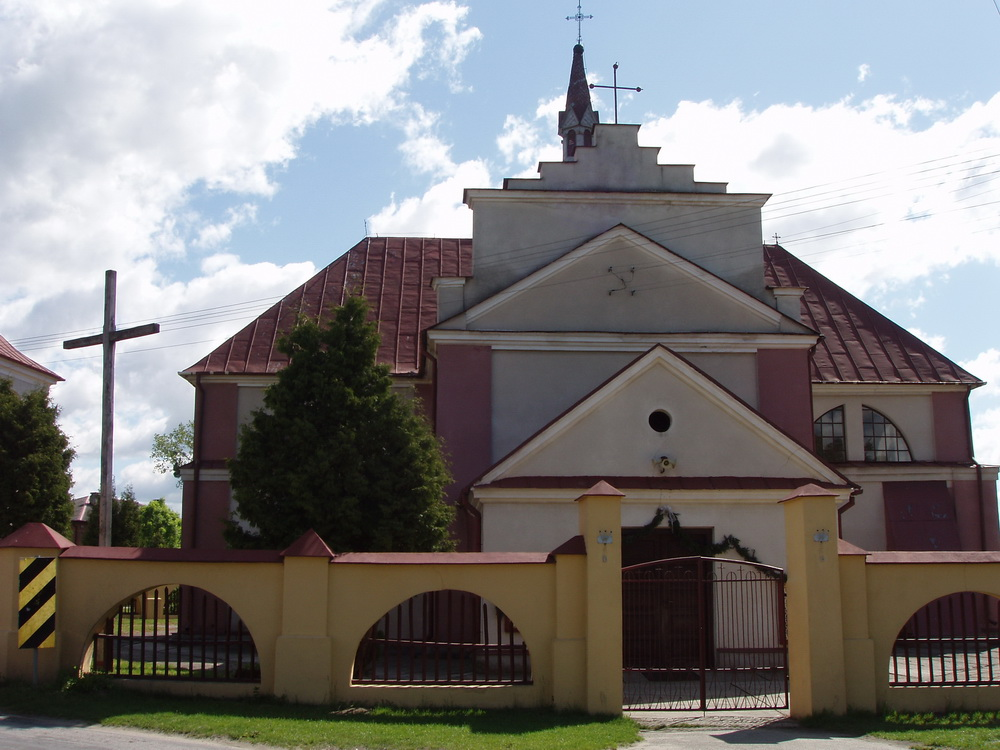
- St. Stanislaus Bishop and Martyr church in Oleksow

- Location within Poland
- Coordinates: 51°29′N 21°49′E
- Country: Poland
- Voivodeship: Masovian
- Powiat: Kozienice
- Gmina: Gniewoszów
- Sołectwo: Oleksów
- Time zone: UTC+1 (CET)
  - Summer (DST): UTC+2 (CEST)
- Postal code: 26-920
- Phone area code(s) (within Poland): 48 xxx xx xx
- Car plate(s): WKZ
- Website: http://www.oleksow.go.pl

Oleksów [ɔˈlɛksuf] is a village in the administrative district of Gmina Gniewoszów, within Kozienice County, Masovian Voivodeship, in east-central Poland.

Five Polish citizens were murdered by Nazi Germany in the village during World War II.
