= Dziecinów, Kozienice County =

Dziecinów
- Village
- Location within Poland
- Coordinates: 51°43′31″N 21°18′23″E
- Country: Poland
- Voivodeship: Masovian
- County: Kozienice
- Gmina: Grabów nad Pilicą
- Population: 100

Dziecinów [d͡ʑɛˈt͡ɕinuf] is a village in the administrative district of Gmina Grabów nad Pilicą, within Kozienice County, Masovian Voivodeship, in east-central Poland. From 1975 to 1998 the village was in Radom Voivodeship.

The village includes the districts of Adamów and Grzybowszczyzna.

== Battle of Kuznow ==
Remnants of the 22nd Infantry Division, 1st Corps of the Imperial Russian Army, were engaged by pursuing German troops, led by Captain Jan Mieszkowski, and destroyed on 14 October 1914, as they attempted to retreat from the Battle of Tannenberg.
