= Anielin, Gmina Garbatka-Letnisko =

Anielin
- Village
- Location within Poland
- Coordinates: 51°27′46″N 21°32′49″E
- Country: Poland
- Voivodeship: Masovian
- Powiat: Kozienice
- Gmina: Garbatka-Letnisko
- Sołectwo: Anielin

Government
  - Wójt: Tadeusz Molenda
- Population (2003): 102
- Time zone: UTC+1 (CET)
  - Summer (DST): UTC+2 (CEST)
- Postal code: 26-930
- Phone area code(s)(within Poland): 48 xxx xx xx
- Car plate(s): WKZ

Anielin [aˈɲɛlin] is a village in the administrative district of Gmina Garbatka-Letnisko, within Kozienice County, Masovian Voivodeship, in east-central Poland.
