= Gmina Garbatka-Letnisko =

Gmina Garbatka-Letnisko Garbatka-Letnisko Commune
- Gmina
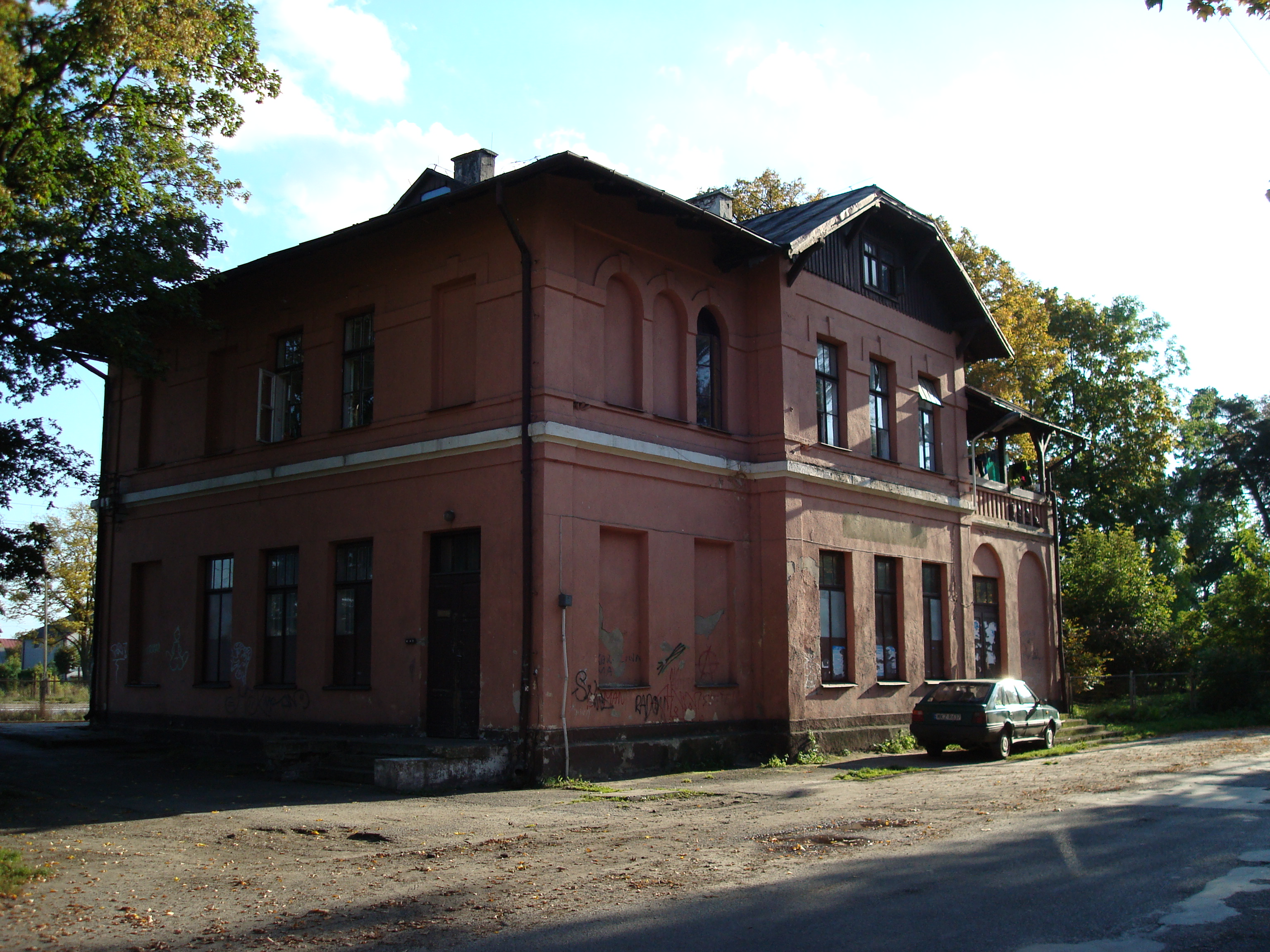

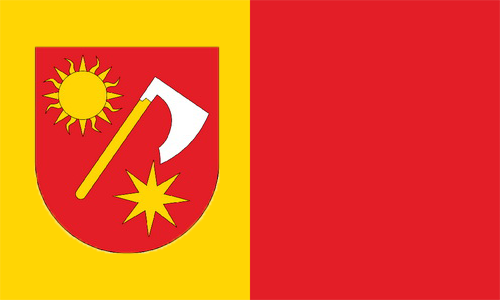
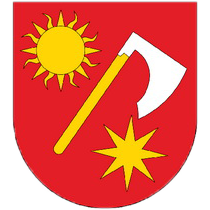
- Flag Coat of arms
- Interactive map of Gmina Garbatka-Letnisko
- Coordinates (Garbatka-Letnisko): 51°29′34″N 21°37′43″E
- Country: Poland
- Voivodeship: Masovian
- County: Kozienice
- Seat: Garbatka-Letnisko

Government
  - Wójt: Tadeusz Molenda

Area
  - Total: 74.01 km^{2} (28.58 sq mi)

Population (2006)
  - Total: 5,338
  - Density: 72.13/km^{2} (186.8/sq mi)
- Postal code: 26-930
- Phone area code(s) (within Poland): 48 xxx xx xx
- Car plate(s): WKZ
- Website: http://www.garbatkaletnisko.pl/

Gmina Garbatka-Letnisko is a rural gmina (administrative district) in Kozienice County, Masovian Voivodeship, in east-central Poland. Its seat is the village of Garbatka-Letnisko, which lies approximately 11 kilometres (7 mi) south-east of Kozienice and 92 km (57 mi) south-east of Warsaw.

The gmina covers an area of 74.01 square kilometres (28.6 sq mi), and as of 2006 its total population is 5,338.

== Villages ==
Gmina Garbatka-Letnisko contains the villages and settlements of Anielin, Bąkowiec, Bogucin, Brzustów, Garbatka Długa, Garbatka Nowa, Garbatka-Dziewiątka, Garbatka-Letnisko, Garbatka-Zbyczyn, Molendy and Ponikwa.

== Neighbouring gminas ==
Gmina Garbatka-Letnisko is bordered by the gminas of Gniewoszów, Kozienice, Pionki, Policzna and Sieciechów.
