= Łękawica (heraldry) =

Heraldic ordinary

Example of łękawica in the escutcheon.

Łękawica is an heraldic ordinary in the shape of 2 joined chevrons, similar to letter W. Usually, it is of the colour of or (gold), azure (blue), or argent (white).

== Usage ==
It was used in the several coat of arms of heraldic clans of Poland, including: Abdank and its variants, Dębno, and Dowgiałło.

It also appears in the coat of arms of several towns, including Krośniewice and Żary in Poland, Obertyn, Ukraine, and Vietka, Belarus, as well as the municipality of Osięciny, Poland. Additionally, it appears in the emblem of the 58th Independent Motorized Infantry Brigade of the Ukrainian Ground Forces.

== Gallery ==
Abdank coat of arms.

Dębno coat of arms.

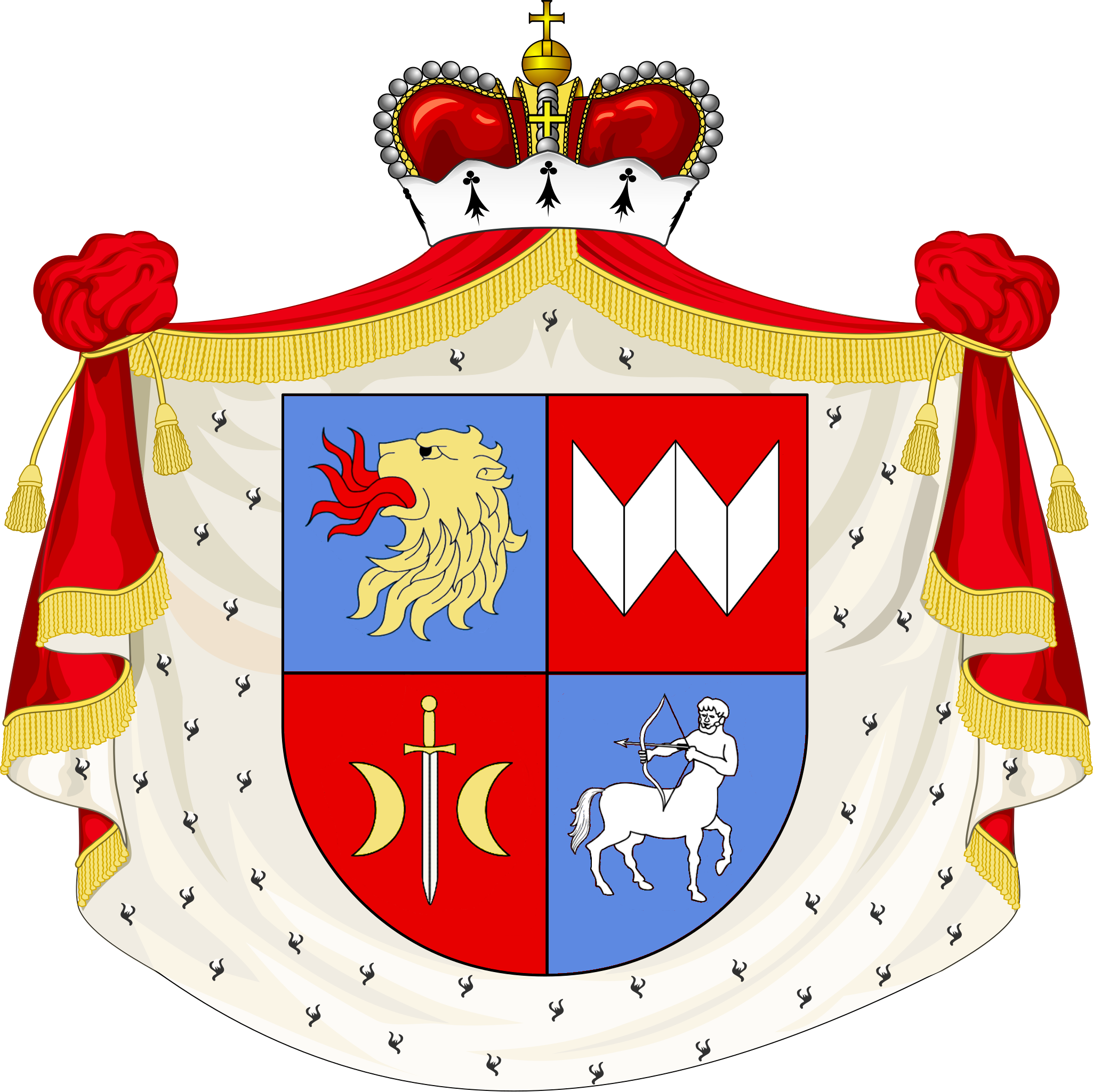
Dowgiałło coat of arms.

Coat of arms of Krośniewice.

Coar of arms of Vietka

Coat of arms of Obertyn.

Coat of arms of Żary.

Coat of arms of the municipality of Osięciny.

Private coat of arms of Ivan Vyhovsky.

Emblem of the 58th Independent Motorized Infantry Brigade.

== Bibliography ==
- K. Niesiecki, Powiększony dodatkami z poźniejszych autorów rękopismów, dowodów, urzędowych i wydany przez Jana Nep. Bobrowicza, J.N. Bobrowicz, vol. 2, Lipsk: Breitkopf i Haertel, 1839.
- Tadeusz Gajl, Herbarz polski od średniowiecza do XX wieku: ponad 4500 herbów szlacheckich 37 tysięcy nazwisk 55 tysięcy rodów. L&L, 2007. ISBN 978-83-60597-10-1.
