= Bogucin Duży =

- Village
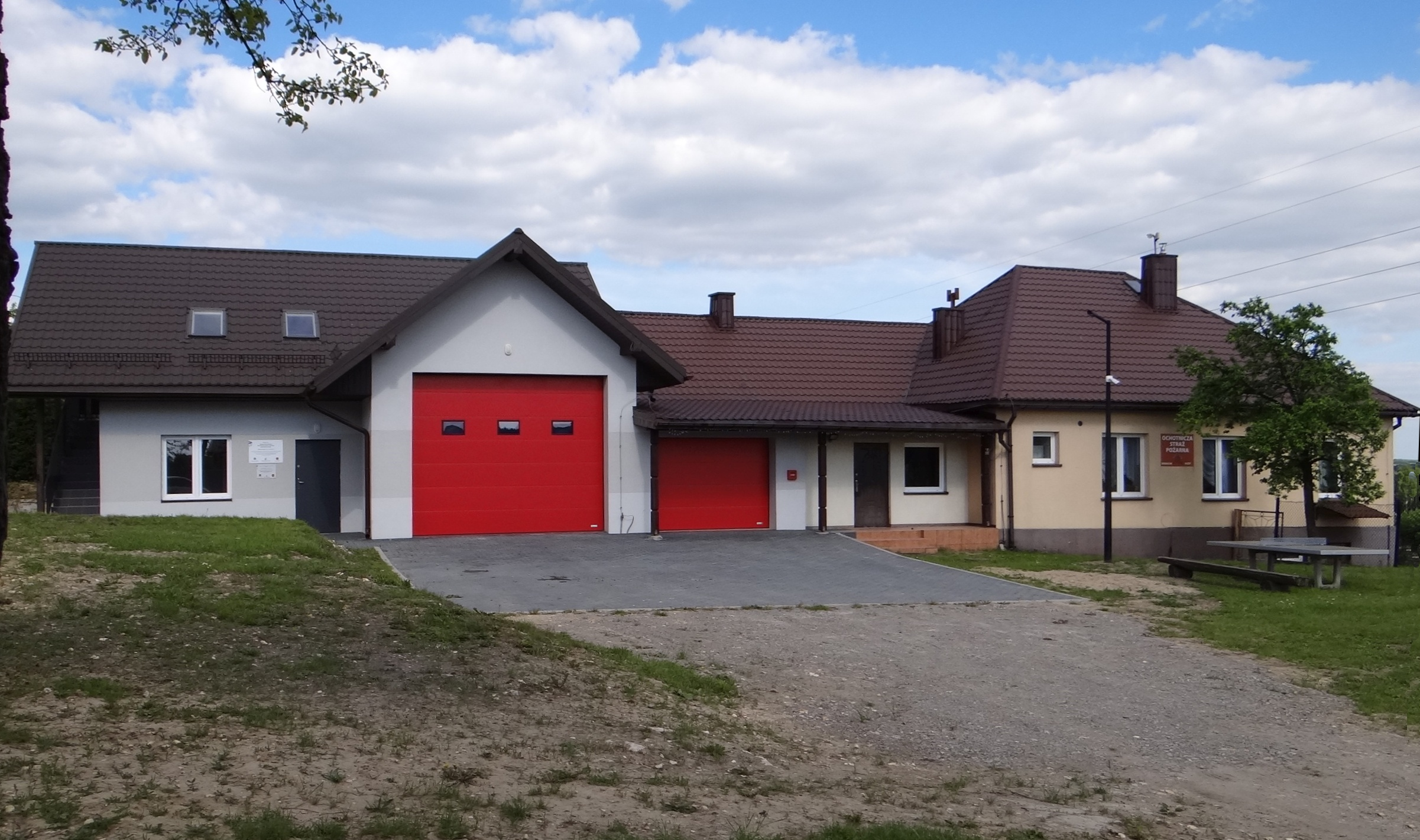
- Fire station

- Location within Poland
- Coordinates: 50°19′22″N 19°35′1″E
- Country: Poland
- Voivodeship: Lesser Poland
- County: Olkusz
- Gmina: Klucze

Bogucin Duży [bɔˈɡut͡ɕin ˈduʐɨ] is a village in the administrative district of Gmina Klucze, within Olkusz County, Lesser Poland Voivodeship, in southern Poland.
