= Garbatka-Letnisko =

Garbatka-Letnisko Garbatka
- Village
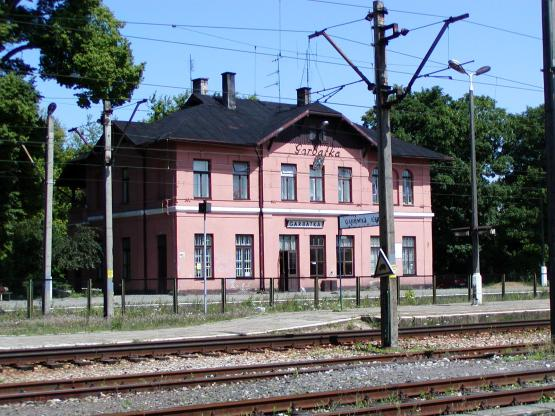
- Garbatka railway station

- Location within Poland
- Coordinates: 51°29′36″N 21°37′55″E
- Country: Poland
- Voivodeship: Masovian
- Powiat: Kozienice
- Gmina: Garbatka-Letnisko
- Sołectwo: Garbatka-Letnisko
- Established: 15th century

Government
  - Wójt: Teresa Fryszkiewicz
- Population (2008): 3,295
- Time zone: UTC+1 (CET)
  - Summer (DST): UTC+2 (CEST)
- Postal code: 26-930
- Phone area code(s) (within Poland): 48 xxx xx xx
- Car plate(s): WKZ

Garbatka-Letnisko [ɡarˈbatka lɛtˈniskɔ] (Letnisko means summer resort) is a village in Kozienice County, Masovian Voivodeship, in east-central Poland. It is the seat of the gmina (administrative district) called Gmina Garbatka-Letnisko.

== History ==
At the present location of Garbatka-Letnisko there were two villages, Garbatka and Rambertów (variously spelled: Rembiertów, Rambertów, Rembertów), until the 15th century.

The first mention of Garbatka in written sources are from 1449. However, there are key references in the "liberum beneficjorum" III 267 Jan Długosz, in documents from the years 1497 and 1542. At that time, Garbatka belonged to the Szliz family, and at the turn of the 15th and 16th century passed into possession of the Kochanowski house. In the 16th century, both the villages, Rambertów and Garbatka were linked.

In 1787, Garbatka had 253 inhabitants, in 1881 715 inhabitants and 101 houses.

In 1795-1809, Garbatka was under Austrian partition, and in 1815–1915 under Russian partition.

The most important years in the history of Garbatka was the interwar period. Then Garbatka became famous as a summer resort. Visited by crowds of tourists, particularly from Radom, Lublin and Warsaw. At that time there were about 400 houses for rent. Houses already built on both sides of the track. Thanks to the local air treatment walorom, many people changed their lives dramatically. In the year 1921 Garbatka had already 1,739 residents, reflecting the strong development of the village.

== See also ==
- Garbatka (disambiguation)

== Sources ==
- Polish: Śmietanka Ryszard. Szkice z Dziejów Garbatki. Garbatka Letnisko 1992
- Polish: Traczyk Stanisław Alfred. Pionki i Okolice, Przewodnik Historyczno-Krajoznawczy. Pionki 1995. ISBN 83-904149-0-2
