= Garbatka, Masovian Voivodeship =

Village in Masovian Voivodeship, Poland

Garbatka
- Village
- Location within Poland
- Coordinates: 52°01′50″N 20°50′43″E
- Country: Poland
- Voivodeship: Masovian
- County: Piaseczno
- Gmina: Lesznowola

Garbatka [ɡarˈbatka] is a village in the administrative district of Gmina Lesznowola, within Piaseczno County, Masovian Voivodeship, in east-central Poland.
