= Kozienice County =

Kozienice County Powiat kozienicki
- County
- Flag Coat of arms

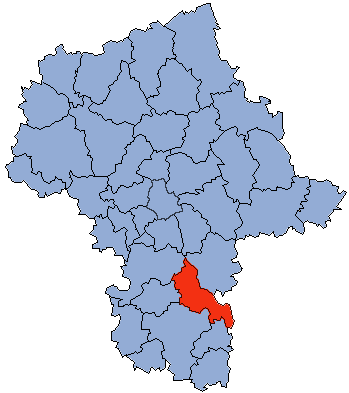
- Location within the voivodeship

- Division into gminas
- Coordinates (Kozienice): 51°35′N 21°34′E
- Country: Poland
- Voivodeship: Masovian
- Seat: Kozienice
- Gminas: Total 7: Gmina Garbatka-Letnisko; Gmina Głowaczów; Gmina Gniewoszów; Gmina Grabów nad Pilicą; Gmina Kozienice; Gmina Magnuszew; Gmina Sieciechów

Area
  - Total: 916.96 km^{2} (354.04 sq mi)

Population (2019)
  - Total: 60,253
  - Density: 65.710/km^{2} (170.19/sq mi)
  - Urban: 17,208
  - Rural: 43,045
- Car plates: WKZ
- Website: www.kozienicepowiat.pl

Kozienice County (Polish: powiat kozienicki) is a unit of territorial administration and local government (powiat) in Masovian Voivodeship, east-central Poland. It came into being on 1 January 1999 as a result of the Polish local government reforms passed in 1998. Its administrative seat and only town is Kozienice, which lies 81 kilometres (50 mi) south-east of Warsaw.

The county covers an area of 916.96 square kilometres (354.0 sq mi). As of 2019, its total population is 60,253, out of which the population of Kozienice is 17,208 and the rural population is 43,045.

The county includes part of the protected area called Kozienice Landscape Park.

== Neighbouring counties ==
Kozienice County is bordered by Garwolin County to the north, Ryki County to the east, Puławy County to the south-east, Zwoleń County to the south, Radom County to the south-west, and Białobrzegi County and Grójec County to the west.

== Administrative divisions ==
The county is subdivided into seven gminas (one urban-rural and six rural). These are listed in the following table, in descending order of population.

Gmina	Type	Area (km^{2})	Population (2019)	Seat
Gmina Kozienice	urban-rural	245.6	29,562	Kozienice
Gmina Głowaczów	rural	186.3	7,211	Głowaczów
Gmina Magnuszew	rural	140.9	6,741	Magnuszew
Gmina Garbatka-Letnisko	rural	74.0	5,036	Garbatka-Letnisko
Gmina Sieciechów	rural	61.3	3,905	Sieciechów
Gmina Grabów nad Pilicą	rural	125.0	3,900	Grabów nad Pilicą
Gmina Gniewoszów	rural	84.3	3,898	Gniewoszów
