= Kamelonka (Zajezierze) =

- Village
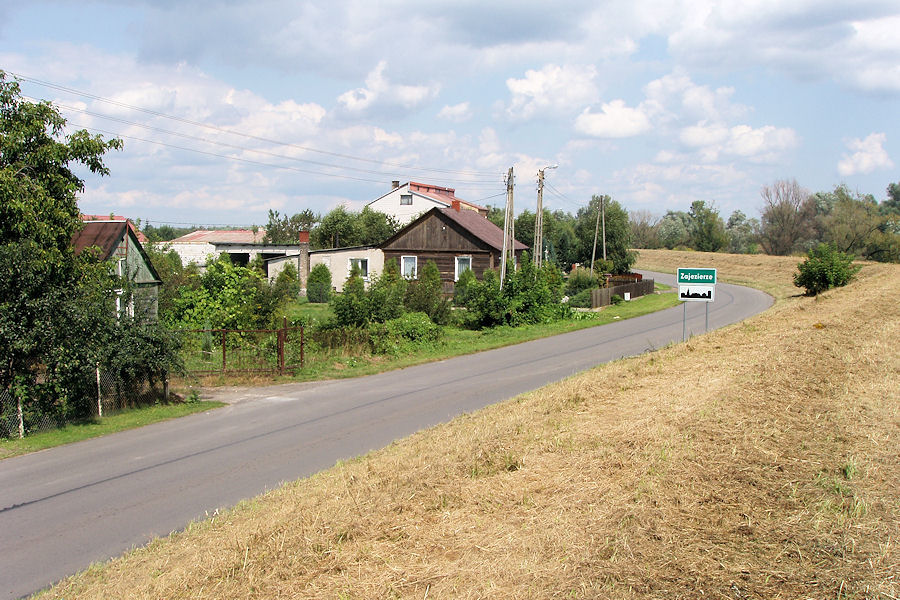
- Kamelonka - a part of the village Zajezierze

- Location within Poland
- Coordinates: 51°32′32″N 21°49′24″E
- Country: Poland
- Voivodeship: Masovian
- Powiat: Kozienice
- Gmina: Sieciechów
- Sołectwo: Zajezierze

Government
  - Wójt: Kazimierz Pochylski
  - Sołtys: Aleksander Dziekoński
- Time zone: UTC+1 (CET)
  - Summer (DST): UTC+2 (CEST)
- Postal code: 26-922 Sieciechów
- Phone area code(s) (within Poland): 48 xxx xx xx
- Car plate(s): WKZ

Kamelonka - agricultural village, as a part of the village Zajezierze in the administrative district of Gmina Sieciechów, within Kozienice County, Masovian Voivodeship, in east-central Poland. It is located in the central valley of the Vistula River on its left bank, opposite the city Dęblin, from which it is separated by two bridges, road and rail.

This settlement is located at the nearby railway station on the rail trail (line 26) Łuków-Radom.

== See also ==
- Zajezierze (disambiguation)
