= Kępice, Masovian Voivodeship =

Kępice
- Village
- Location within Poland
- Coordinates: 51°32′52″N 21°45′39″E
- Country: Poland
- Voivodeship: Masovian
- Powiat: Kozienice
- Gmina: Sieciechów
- Sołectwo: Kępice

Government
  - Wójt: Kazimierz Pochylski
  - Sołtys: Antoni Abramczyk
- Population (2006): 175
- Time zone: UTC+1 (CET)
  - Summer (DST): UTC+2 (CEST)
- Postal code: 26-922
- Phone area code(s) (within Poland): 48 xxx xx xx
- Car plate(s): WKZ

Kępice [kɛmˈpit͡sɛ] is a village in the administrative district of Gmina Sieciechów, within Kozienice County, Masovian Voivodeship, in east-central Poland.

== History ==
Every year, on the first Sunday of November, a ceremony is held to celebrate Polish Independence Day with an escort of the Polish Army. The ceremony begins with Mass in the parish church in Opactwo, then a tribute is paid to soldiers at the Opactwo cemetery, followed by a meeting at the monument in Kępice.
