= Wola Klasztorna =

- Village
- Location within Poland
- Coordinates: 51°31′03″N 21°45′31″E
- Country: Poland
- Voivodeship: Masovian
- Powiat: Kozienice
- Gmina: Sieciechów
- Sołectwo: Wola Klasztorna

Government
  - Wójt: Kazimierz Pochylski
  - Sołtys: Bogusław Tkaczyk
- Population (2006): 250
- Time zone: UTC+1 (CET)
  - Summer (DST): UTC+2 (CEST)
- Postal code: 26-922 Sieciechów
- Phone area code(s) (within Poland): 48 xxx xx xx
- Car plate(s): WKZ

Wola Klasztorna (Polish: [ˈvɔla klaʂˈtɔrna]; "Monastery Will") is a village in the administrative district of Gmina Sieciechów, within Kozienice County, Masovian Voivodeship, in east-central Poland. Former name of the village - Święcica. The current name, Wola Klasztorna probably comes from the former Benedictine Monastery in Opactwo times.
