= Słowiki Nowe =

- Village
- Location within Poland
- Coordinates: 51°32′12″N 21°39′44″E
- Country: Poland
- Voivodeship: Masovian
- Powiat: Kozienice
- Gmina: Sieciechów
- Sołectwo: Słowiki Nowe

Government
  - Wójt: Kazimierz Pochylski
  - Sołtys: Czesław Chaba
- Population (2006): 255
- Time zone: UTC+1 (CET)
  - Summer (DST): UTC+2 (CEST)
- Postal code: 26-922 Sieciechów
- Phone area code (within Poland): 48 xxx xx xx
- Car plate(s): WKZ

Słowiki Nowe [swɔˈviki ˈnɔvɛ] or Nowe Słowiki is a village in the administrative district of Gmina Sieciechów, within Kozienice County, Masovian Voivodeship, in east-central Poland. The name means "New Słowiki" (it is close to the village of Stare Słowiki, which means "Old Słowiki"). The word słowiki in Polish means "nightingales".

The village has 255 inhabitants in 2006.
