= Morzycko Lake =

Morzycko
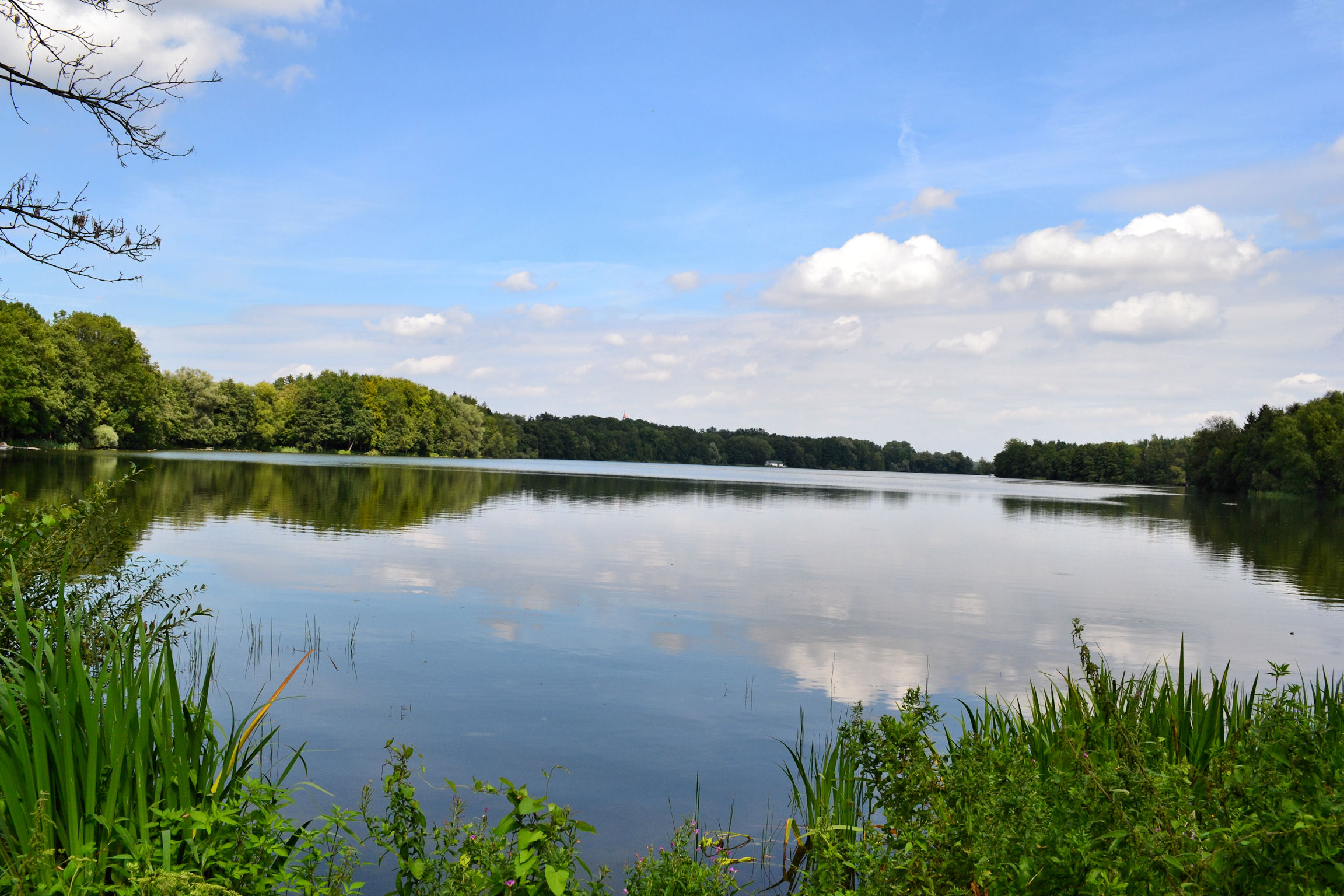
- Morzycko Lake

- Location within West Pomeranian Voivodeship
- Coordinates: 52°51′50″N 14°24′33″E
- Type: lake
- Basin countries: Poland
- Max. length: 2.9 km (1.8 mi)
- Max. width: 1.4 km (0.87 mi)
- Surface area: 3.42 km^{2} (1.32 sq mi)
- Average depth: 14.5 m (48 ft)
- Max. depth: 60 m (200 ft)
- Water volume: 52,000 m^{3} (42 acre⋅ft)
- Settlements: Moryń, Przyjezierze, Gądno

Morzycko Lake (Polish: Jezioro Morzycko; German: Mohriner See) is a lake located in the Myślibórz Lake District, in the eastern outer suburbs of the town of Moryń, in the West Pomeranian Voivodeship, Gmina Moryń, in Poland. The lake is part of the Cedynia Landscape Park.

Morzycko Lake is the ninth-deepest lake in Poland.
