= Zajezierze, Masovian Voivodeship =

Zajezierze
- Village
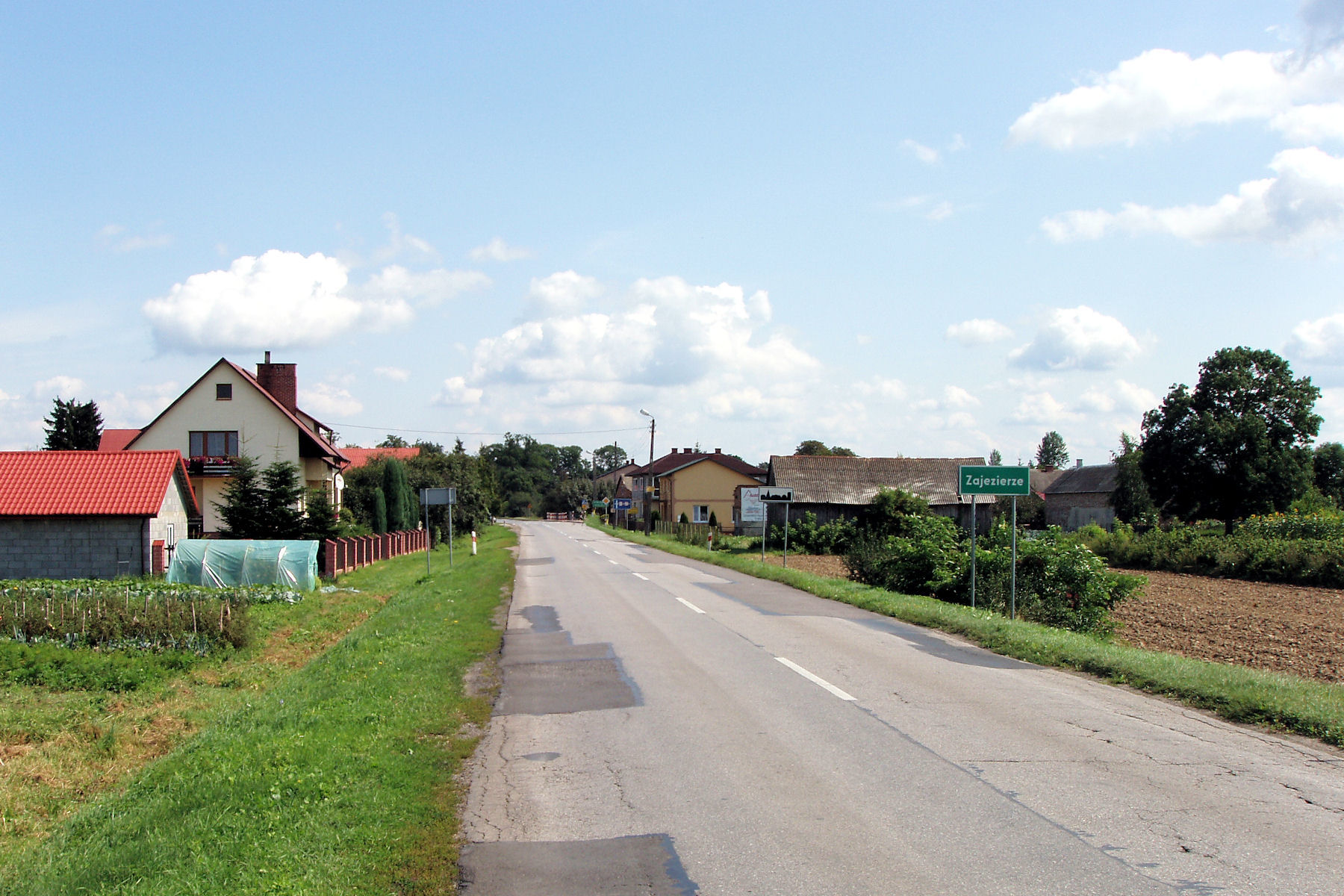

- Location within Poland
- Coordinates: 51°32′34″N 21°48′28″E
- Country: Poland
- Voivodeship: Masovian
- Powiat: Kozienice
- Gmina: Sieciechów
- Sołectwo: Zajezierze

Government
  - Wójt: Kazimierz Pochylski
  - Sołtys: Aleksander Dziekoński
- Population (2006): 1,100
- Time zone: UTC+1 (CET)
  - Summer (DST): UTC+2 (CEST)
- Postal code: 26-922 Sieciechów
- Phone area code(s) (within Poland): 48 xxx xx xx
- Car plate(s): WKZ

Zajezierze [zajɛˈʑɛʐɛ] is a village in the administrative district of Gmina Sieciechów, within Kozienice County, Masovian Voivodeship, in east-central Poland.

It is located in the central valley of the Vistula River on its left bank, opposite the city Dęblin, from which it is separated by two bridges, road and rail. On the national road DK 48 and the rail trail (line 26) Łuków-Radom.

In the years 1957-1975 as a class town, administratively belonged to the district Kozienice as part of the Region Kielce. In the period 1975-1998 was administratively belonged to the district Kozienice as part of the Region Radom.

== See also ==
- Zajezierze (disambiguation)
- Kamelonka (Zajezierze)
