= Słowiki-Folwark =

- Village
- The village shop

- Location within Poland
- Coordinates: 51°32′23″N 21°39′31″E
- Country: Poland
- Voivodeship: Masovian
- Powiat: Kozienice
- Gmina: Sieciechów
- Sołectwo: Słowiki-Folwark

Government
  - Wójt: Kazimierz Pochylski
  - Sołtys: Marianna Ziemka

Population (2006)
  - Total: 166
- Time zone: UTC+1 (CET)
  - Summer (DST): UTC+2 (CEST)
- Postal code: 26-922 Sieciechów
- Phone area code(s) (within Poland): 48 xxx xx xx
- Car plate(s): WKZ

Słowiki-Folwark [swɔˈviki ˈfɔlvark] is a village in the administrative district of Gmina Sieciechów, within Kozienice County, Masovian Voivodeship, in east-central Poland.
