= Występ, Masovian Voivodeship =

Występ
- Village
- Location within Poland
- Coordinates: 51°32′55″N 21°47′40″E
- Country: Poland
- Voivodeship: Masovian
- Powiat: Kozienice
- Gmina: Sieciechów
- Sołectwo: Występ

Government
  - Wójt: Kazimierz Pochylski
  - Sołtys: Sabina Wrutniak
- Time zone: UTC+1 (CET)
  - Summer (DST): UTC+2 (CEST)
- Postal code: 26-922 Sieciechów
- Phone area code(s) (within Poland): 48 xxx xx xx
- Car plate: WKZ

Występ [ˈvɨstɛmp] (Protrusion) is a village in the administrative district of Gmina Sieciechów, within Kozienice County, Masovian Voivodeship, in east-central Poland.
