= Moryń-Dwór =

- Settlement
- Location within Poland
- Coordinates: 52°49′47″N 14°22′00″E
- Country: Poland
- Voivodeship: West Pomeranian
- County: Gryfino
- Gmina: Moryń
- Population (2024): 13

Moryń-Dwór [ˈmɔrɨɲ ˈdvur] (German: Neue Welt) is a settlement in Gmina Moryń, within Gryfino County, West Pomeranian Voivodeship, in north-western Poland. It administratively belongs to the sołectwo of Przyjezierze.

== Geography ==
Moryń-Dwór is located within Przyjezierze II (sołectwo of Przyjezierze) in the municipality of Gmina Moryń. Moryń-Dwór lies around 3 km (2 mi) west/south-west of the municipal capital Moryń.

The 'settlement' of Moryń-Dwór in reality consists of two developed areas: the Zakład Rolny "Moryń" agricultural plant in the north and, about 1.5 km (1 mi) south of it, the actual inhabited settlement of Moryń-Dwór with a history before 1945. The southern settlement lies on the local road connecting Moryń and Gozdowice.

North of the agricultural plant there exists a reservoir covered in reeds into which the Słubia flows. To the west of both developed areas, and to the south of the southern one as well, lies a forest that is part of the Cedynia Landscape Park.

== History ==
The southern settlement of what now constitutes Moryń-Dwór was known by the German name Neue Welt and designated both a Vorwerk as well as a Rittergut. It was operated as a city-owned manor farm before the 19th century when it passed into private ownership. It was incorporated into the municipality of Mohrin (now Moryń) in 1928. At some point before 1945, the settlement was renamed from Neue Welt to Gut Mohrin. The manor farm was destroyed around 1945 and now lies in ruins.

After the flight and expulsion of Germans from the area as a consequence of World War II, the settlement was given its modern Polish name "Moryń-Dwór". Between 1975 and 1998, Moryń-Dwór was part of the Szczecin Voivodeship.

The modern Zakład Rolny "Moryń" agricultural plant, which constitutes the northern developed area of what is now considered Moryń-Dwór, was registered as a company on 12 May 2002. Much of the infrastructure the company relies on however dates back to communist rule.

== Demographics ==
Historical population

Year	Pop.	±%
2008	13	—
2009	13	+0.0%
2010	13	+0.0%
2011	13	+0.0%
2012	14	+7.7%
2013	12	−14.3%
2014	11	−8.3%
2015	11	+0.0%
2016	12	+9.1%

Year	Pop.	±%
2017	14	+16.7%
2018	14	+0.0%
2019	14	+0.0%
2020	14	+0.0%
2021	14	+0.0%
2022	14	+0.0%
2023	14	+0.0%
2024	13	−7.1%

Data may be affected by territorial fluctuation.
Sources: 2008 & 2009 2010-2024
