= Sieciechów, Masovian Voivodeship =

Sieciechów
- Village
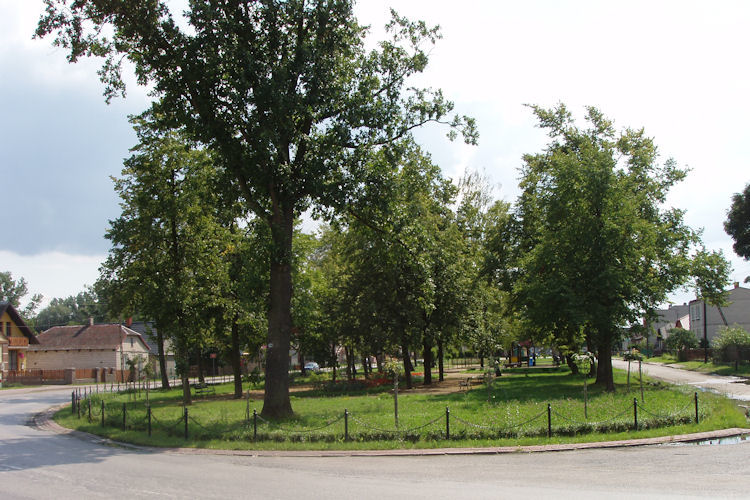

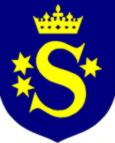
- Seal

- Location within Poland
- Coordinates: 51°32′22″N 21°44′41″E
- Country: Poland
- Voivodeship: Masovian
- Powiat: Kozienice
- Gmina: Sieciechów
- Sołectwo: Sieciechów

Government
  - Wójt: Kazimierz Pochylski
  - Sołtys: Jan Wojtasik

Population (2006)
  - Total: 430
- Time zone: UTC+1 (CET)
  - Summer (DST): UTC+2 (CEST)
- Postal code: 26-922
- Phone area code(s) (within Poland): 48 xxx xx xx
- Car plates: WKZ

Sieciechów [ɕɛˈt͡ɕɛxuf] is a village in Kozienice County, Masovian Voivodeship, in east-central Poland. It is the seat of the gmina (administrative district) called Gmina Sieciechów.

== History ==
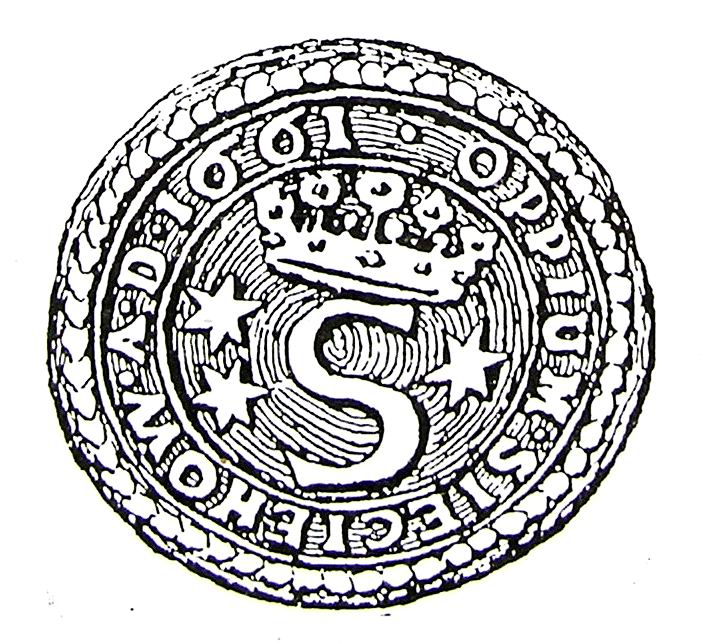
Former seal of Sieciechów

Sieciechów has a long and rich history. Until the 14th century, it was one of major political, economical and administrative centers of Lesser Poland’s Duchy of Sandomierz, which later was renamed into Sandomierz Voivodeship. It was the seat of a castellan and a county, but in the late 14th century, Sieciechów's importance diminished, and it was replaced as administrative center of this part of Lesser Poland by quickly-developing Radom.

Sieciechów takes its name from Sieciech - a palatine at the court of duke Władysław I Herman. In the times of the Piast dynasty, Sieciechów was the seat of local dukes, and first mention of the village dates back to the 10th century. In 1132 the Sieciechów Castle became the property of High Prince Bolesław III Wrymouth and became the seat of castellans. As Gall Anonim wrote, it was the biggest castle along the Vistula between Sandomierz and Płock. In 1232 Sieciechów received a town charter (Magdeburg rights).

In the late Middle Ages, Sieciechów was located on a merchant trail from Sandomierz through Zawichost, to Lithuanian lands. It had a parish church of St. Lawrence, which controlled parishes of large parts of northern Lesser Poland, at such towns, as Kozienice, Stężyca, Dęblin, Zwoleń and Kazimierz Dolny. Sieciechów probably had a defensive wall, and a Vistula river port. Its first known castellan was named Florian, his name was mentioned in 1239. In 1432 King Władysław Jagiełło gave permission for fairs, but period of prosperity ended after the change of the course of the Vistula. As a result, the town no longer controlled the strategic river, and the castle, which was located on a hill right above river bank, no longer fulfilled its role. Furthermore, after the Union of Krewo, Poland was no longer threatened by Lithuanian raids. Sieciechów remained a town until 1869, when the government of Russian-controlled Congress Poland reduced it to the status of a village.

== Sights ==
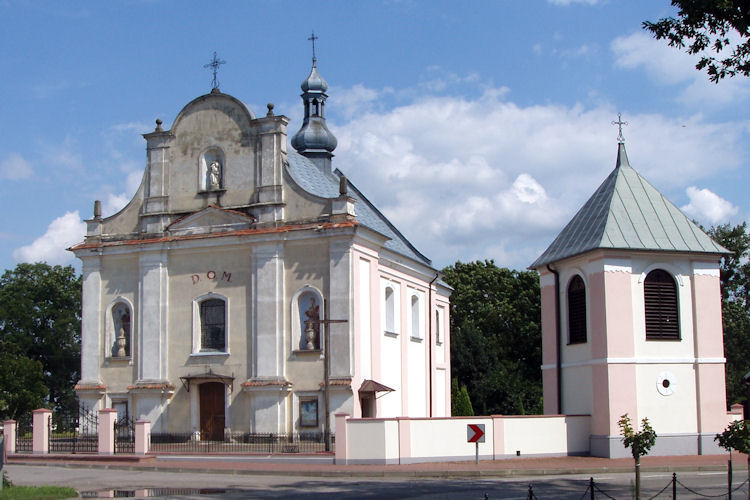
Saint Lawrence church

Among points of interest there are:

- Baroque abbey church (1739-1767),
- complex of a Benedictine Abbey. The abbey itself was founded by either Sieciech or Boleslaw Krzywousty. Its original location is not known, the abbey was moved to its present location some time in the mid-14th century. Current complex was built in the 18th century. The abbey had a renowned school, which existed until 1575, and a large library,
- St. Lawrence parish church (1710-1769), with a bell from 1459,
- Sieciechów Castle. It is not known when original, wooden castle was built, but it has been established that the stone complex was built by King Casimir III the Great. The castle was already in ruins by 1575, after it had long lost its strategic importance.

== See also ==
- Sieciechów
