= Słowiki Stare =

- Village
- Location within Poland
- Coordinates: 51°32′39″N 21°39′08″E
- Country: Poland
- Voivodeship: Masovian
- Powiat: Kozienice
- Gmina: Sieciechów
- Sołectwo: Słowiki Stare

Government
  - Wójt: Kazimierz Pochylski
  - Sołtys: Bogdan Amerek
- Time zone: UTC+1 (CET)
  - Summer (DST): UTC+2 (CEST)
- Postal code: 26-922 Sieciechów
- Phone area code(s) (within Poland): 48 xxx xx xx
- Car plate(s): WKZ

Słowiki Stare [swɔˈviki ˈstarɛ] or Stare Słowiki is a village in the administrative district of Gmina Sieciechów, within Kozienice County, Masovian Voivodeship, in east-central Poland.

The word słowiki means "nightingales" in Polish. Stare means "Old" – distinguishing this village from the nearby Słowiki Nowe ("New").
