= Bielin, West Pomeranian Voivodeship =

Bielin
- Village
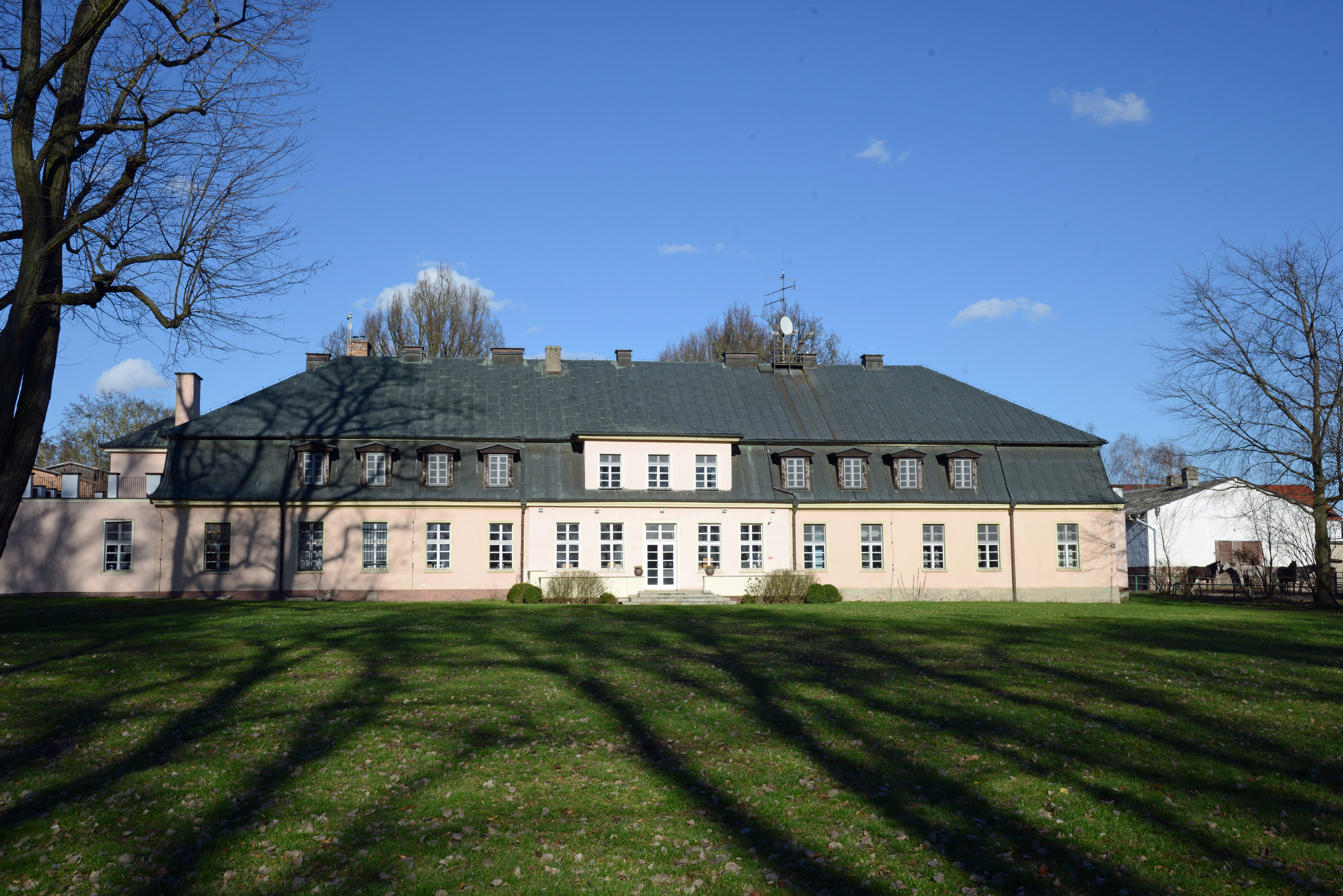
- Bellin estate

- Location within Poland
- Coordinates: 52°49′45″N 14°27′15″E
- Country: Poland
- Voivodeship: West Pomeranian
- County: Gryfino
- Gmina: Moryń

Government
  - Sołtys: Marcin Sobczyński
- Population (2024): 395

Bielin [ˈbjɛlin] (German: Bellin) is a village in the Gmina Moryń, within Gryfino County, West Pomeranian Voivodeship, in north-western Poland. The village is characterized by its medieval church, historic estate, and various farms. It lies approximately 6 km (4 mi) south-east of the municipal capital Moryń and 66 km (41 mi) south of the regional capital Szczecin.

== Geography ==
Bielin is a sołectwo within the municipality Gmina Moryń in Gryfino County, West Pomeranian Voivodeship. The Bielin sołectwo, besides the settlement of Bielin itself, also includes the settlement of Macierz within its borders. It lies approximately 6 km (4 mi) south-east of Moryń, 47 km (29 mi) south of Gryfino, and 66 km (41 mi) south of the regional capital Szczecin.

About 600 m (1,969 ft) south-east of the settlement lies a train station on the Wrocław–Szczecin railway, which runs besides the settlement and bisects the settlement's sołectwo to the east.

== History ==
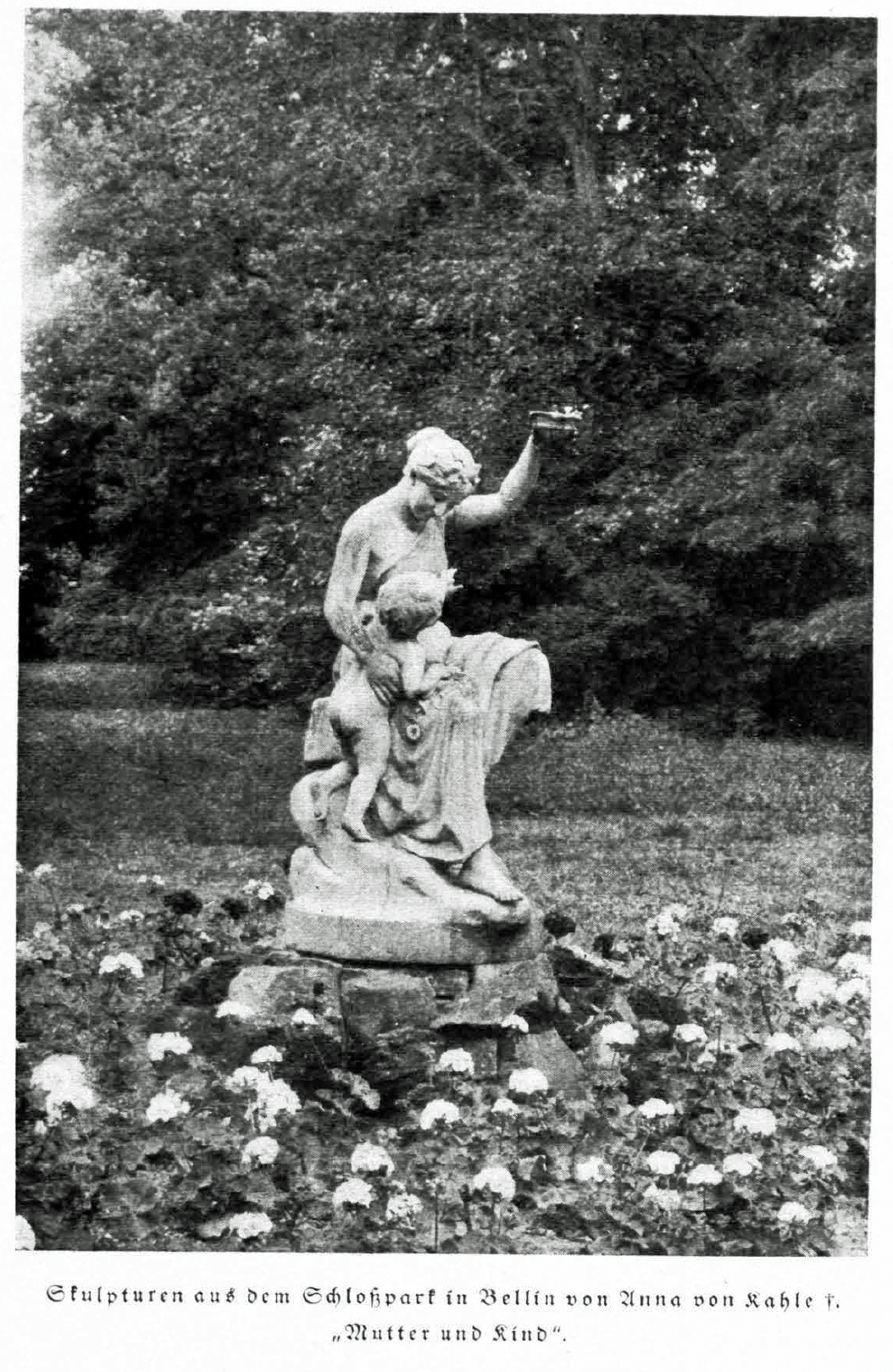
The sculpture "Mother with child" by Anna von Kahle stood in the Bellin until, like most of her works in the village, going missing in 1945.

Bielin, at the time known by its German name Bellin, was first mentioned in a finance register of the Land Bärwalde in 1337. During these times, the village was owned by the von Brünkow family. It then continued to change ownership from the 16th century onwards, notably being the residences of the von Werbelow and von Steinbeck families at various points during these times. In 1590, Otto von Holzendorf bought the estate, again selling it in 1595 to Zabel von Holzendorf for 5,700 thalers. In 1608 Bellin once again fell into the ownership of the von Werbelow family which continued its ownership until at least 1644. Around 1748, it was owned by the von Wobeser family, a former member of which, Ernestine von de Borne (née Wobeser) bought the village with her sisters and children from the family member and Prussian lieutenant general Georg Friedrich von Wobeser. Although Wilhelm August Woteslaw bought the village in 1825, the 1828 local knightly registry (Ritterschaftlicher Matrikel) still showed the von Wobeser family as the owners of the village. By 1840, the von Kahle family is mentioned as the owner of the village.

The well-known sculptor Anna von Kahle was born and resided in Bellin. The village became its own municipality in 1935, a status revoked when it fell under Polish administration. It is now a part of the Gmina Moryń.

After the flight and expulsion of Germans from the area as a consequence of World War II, the settlement has been given its modern Polish name "Bielin". Between 1975 and 1998, Bielin was part of the Szczecin Voivodeship.

== Demographics ==
Historical population

Year	Pop.	±%
1895	116	—
1910	106	−8.6%
1925	434	+309.4%
1933	344	−20.7%
1939	359	+4.4%
2010	485	+35.1%
2011	476	−1.9%
2012	467	−1.9%
2013	466	−0.2%
2014	468	+0.4%

Year	Pop.	±%
2015	464	−0.9%
2016	455	−1.9%
2017	452	−0.7%
2018	446	−1.3%
2019	434	−2.7%
2020	431	−0.7%
2021	423	−1.9%
2022	410	−3.1%
2023	408	−0.5%
2024	395	−3.2%

Data may be affected by territorial fluctuation.
Sources: 1895–1925, 1933 & 1939, 2010–2024

== Politics ==
Bielin is a sołectwo in the municipality Gmina Moryń.

As of 2025, the current sołtys (village head) of Bielin is Marcin Sobczyński who entered office on 11 June 2024. The village council consists of five members.

List of known village heads:

- 2003-2015: Dorawa Bogumiła
- 2015-2023: Anna Sobczyńska
- since 2024: Marcin Sobczyński

== Gallery ==
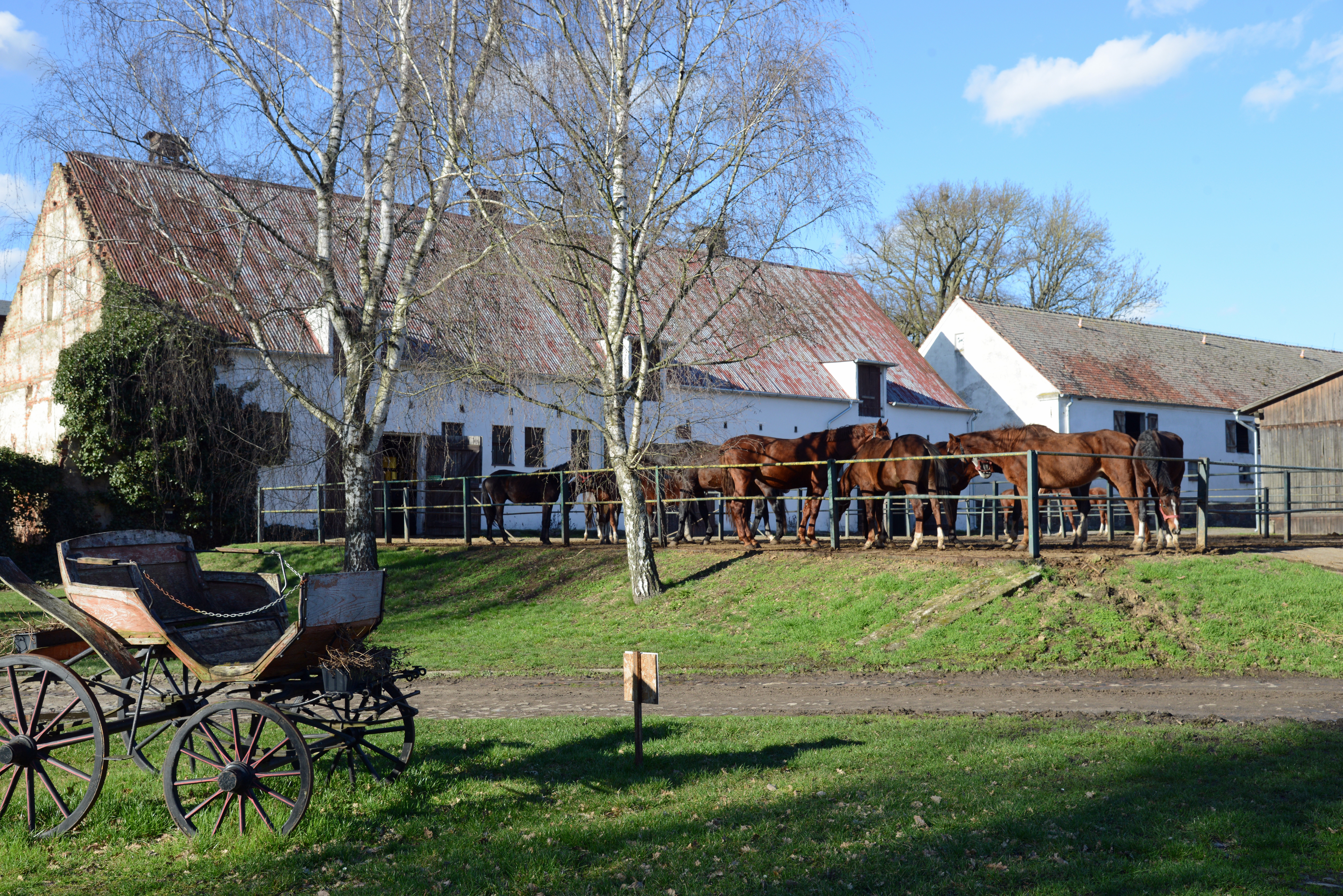
The estate's stud farm

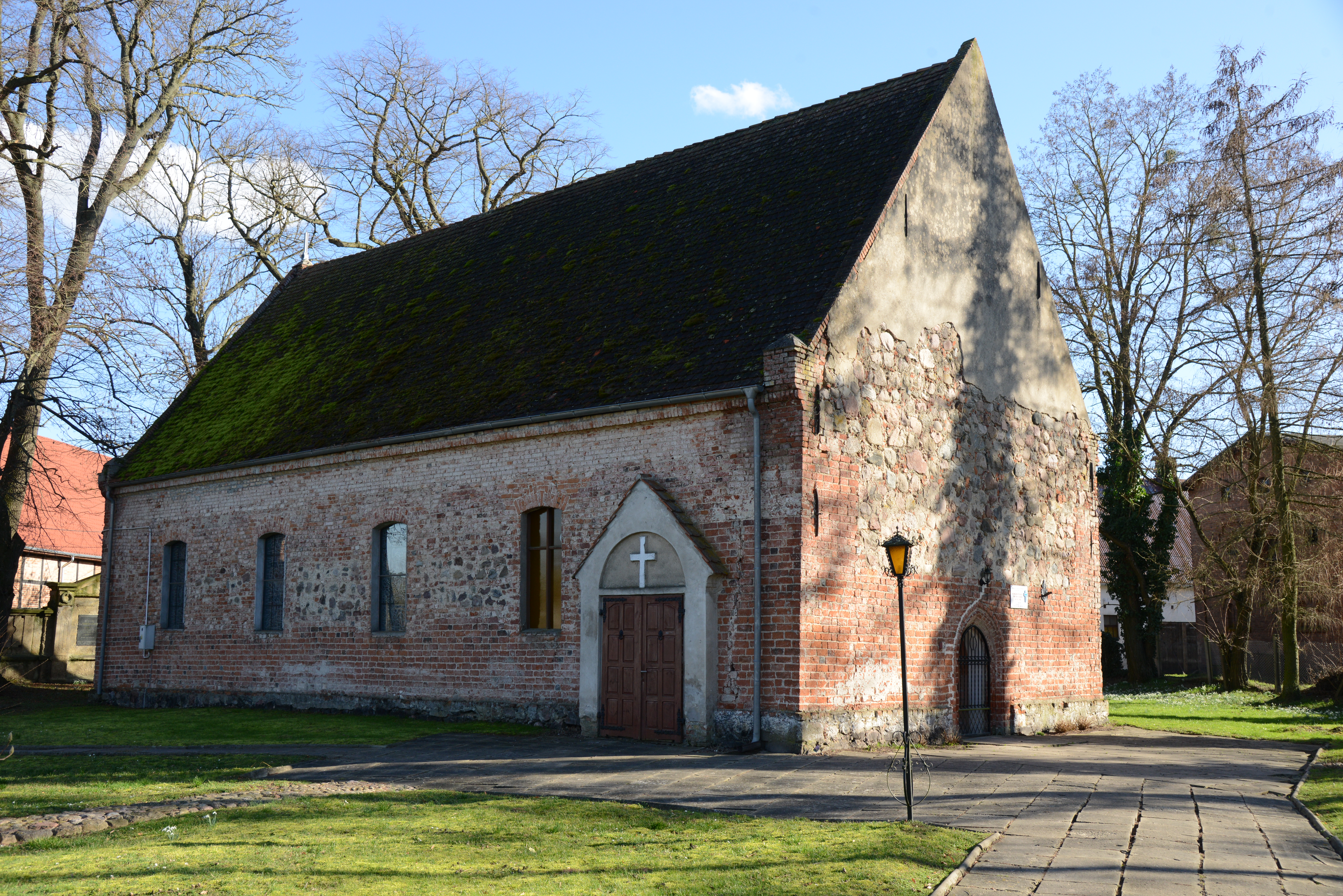
Saint Joseph church

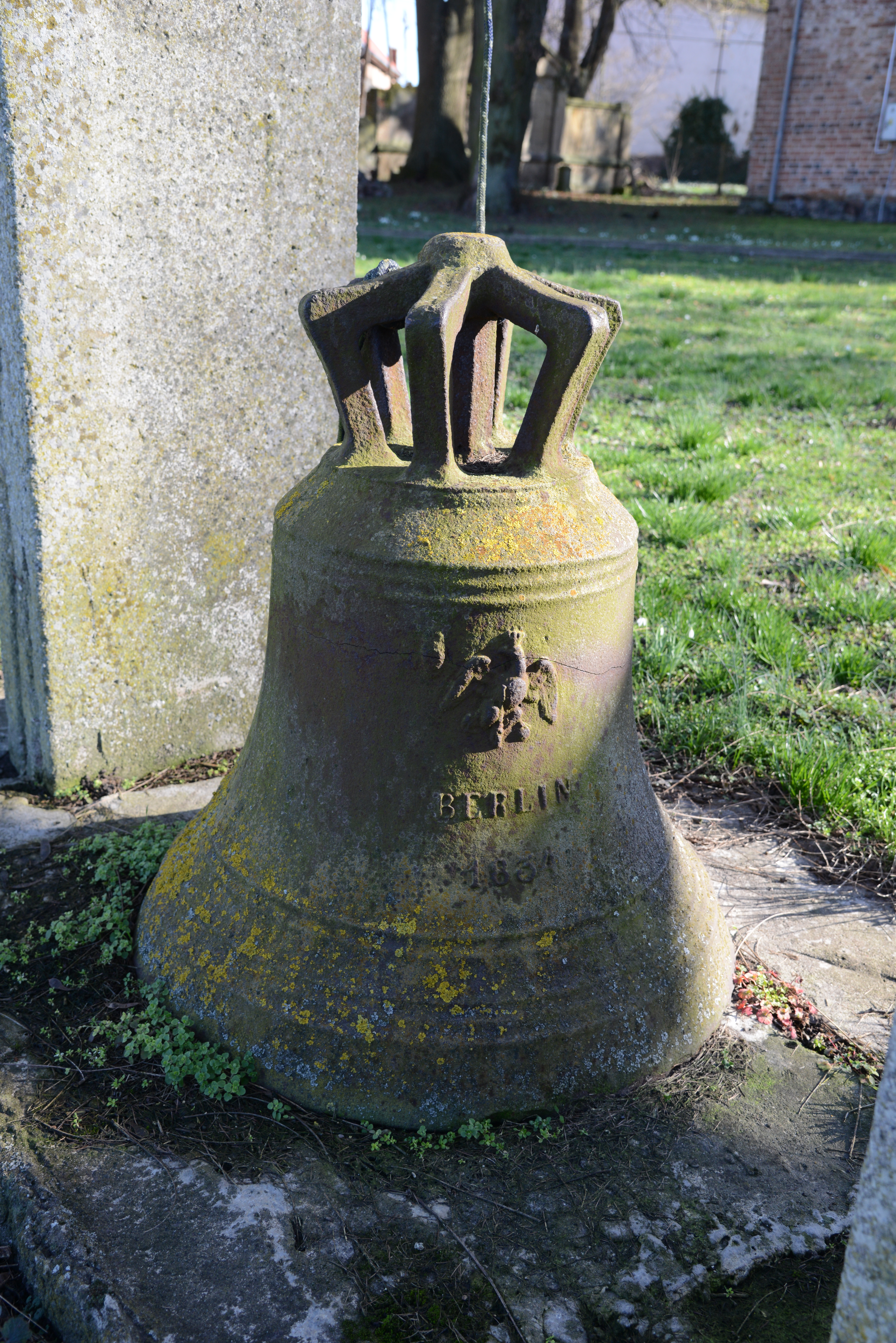
Old church bell

== Notable people ==
- Georg Friedrich von Wobeser (1750–1823), Prussian lieutenant general
- Anna von Kahle (1843–1920), German sculptor
