= Nagórnik, Masovian Voivodeship =

Nagórnik
- Village
- Location within Poland
- Coordinates: 51°31′49″N 21°46′59″E
- Country: Poland
- Voivodeship: Masovian
- Powiat: Kozienice
- Gmina: Sieciechów
- Sołectwo: Nagórnik

Government
  - Wójt: Kazimierz Pochylski
  - Sołtys: Krystyna Boryczka
- Time zone: UTC+1 (CET)
  - Summer (DST): UTC+2 (CEST)
- Postal code: 26-922 Sieciechów
- Phone area code(s) (within Poland): 48 xxx xx xx
- Car plate(s): WKZ

Nagórnik [naˈɡurnik] is a village in the administrative district of Gmina Sieciechów, within Kozienice County, Masovian Voivodeship, in east-central Poland.

== See also ==
Nagórnik, Lower Silesian Voivodeship
