= Skotnica, West Pomeranian Voivodeship =

Skotnica
- Settlement
- Location within Poland
- Coordinates: 52°51′28″N 14°21′30″E
- Country: Poland
- Voivodeship: West Pomeranian
- County: Gryfino
- Gmina: Moryń
- Population (2024): 1

Skotnica [skɔtˈnit͡sa] (German: Schäfereivorwerk) is a settlement within the sołectwo of Stare Objezierze in Gmina Moryń, Gryfino County, West Pomeranian Voivodeship, in north-western Poland. It lies approximately 2 km (1 mi) west of the municipal centre Moryń and 44 km (27 mi) south of Gryfino. It is the settlement with the lowest population in the Gmina Moryń. The majority of the settlements' territory is covered by the German-operated Reiterhof Podkowa.

== History ==
The settlements' German name is Schäfereivorwerk, distinguished as Schäferei Klein Wubiser on some maps (Schäferei translating to sheep farm). Its administrative status was a Vorwerk as reflected in its name. It had a population of 4 in 1895. The settlement has always been part of Stare Objezierze (German: Klein Wubiser), under German as well as under Polish administration.

After the flight and expulsion of Germans from the area as a consequence of World War II, the settlement attained its current Polish name "Skotnica". Between 1975 and 1998, Skotnica was part of the Szczecin Voivodeship.

== Demographics ==
As of 2024, the settlement is home to a single resident. As of 2021 that sole resident was male.

Historical population

Year	Pop.	±%
1895	4	—
2010	1	−75.0%
2011	1	+0.0%
2012	1	+0.0%
2013	1	+0.0%
2014	1	+0.0%
2015	1	+0.0%
2016	1	+0.0%

Year	Pop.	±%
2017	1	+0.0%
2018	1	+0.0%
2019	1	+0.0%
2020	1	+0.0%
2021	1	+0.0%
2022	1	+0.0%
2023	1	+0.0%
2024	1	+0.0%

Data may be affected by territorial fluctuation.
Sources: 1895, 2010-2024
