= Opactwo, Masovian Voivodeship =

Opactwo
- Village
- Location within Poland
- Coordinates: 51°32′05″N 21°46′12″E
- Country: Poland
- Voivodeship: Masovian
- Powiat: Kozienice
- Gmina: Sieciechów
- Sołectwo: Opactwo

Government
  - Wójt: Kazimierz Pochylski
  - Sołtys: Łucja Czerska
- Time zone: UTC+1 (CET)
  - Summer (DST): UTC+2 (CEST)
- Postal code: 26-922 Sieciechów
- Phone area code(s) (within Poland): 48 xxx xx xx
- Car plate(s): WKZ

Opactwo [ɔˈpat͡stfɔ] is a village in the administrative district of Gmina Sieciechów, within Kozienice County, Masovian Voivodeship, in east-central Poland.
