= Gmina Sieciechów =

- Gmina
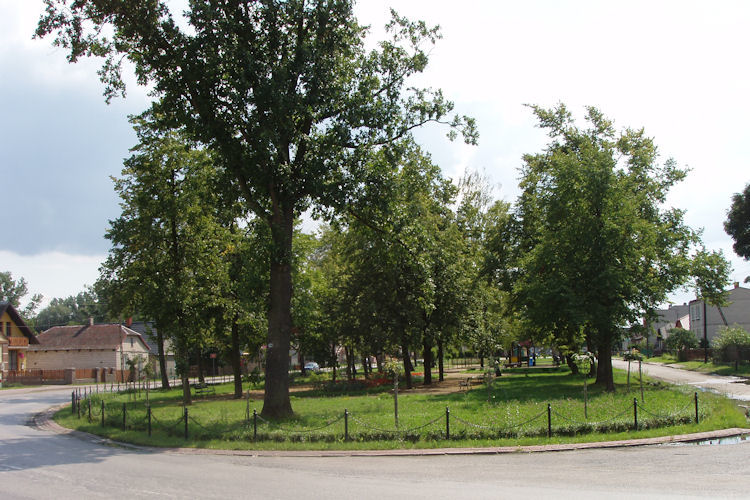

- Coat of arms

- Location within Poland
- Coordinates (Sieciechów): 51°32′21″N 21°44′41″E
- Country: Poland
- Voivodeship: Masovian
- County: Kozienice
- Seat: Sieciechów

Government
  - Wójt: Kazimierz Pochylski

Area
  - Total: 61.26 km^{2} (23.65 sq mi)

Population (2006)
  - Total: 4,271
  - Density: 69.72/km^{2} (180.6/sq mi)
- Postal code: 26-922
- Phone area code(s) (within Poland): 48 xxx xx xx
- Car plates: WKZ
- Website: https://www.sieciechow.pl

Gmina Sieciechów is a rural gmina (administrative district) in Kozienice County, Masovian Voivodeship, in east-central Poland. Its seat is the village of Sieciechów, which lies approximately 14 kilometres (9 mi) east of Kozienice and 91 km (57 mi) south-east of Warsaw.

The gmina covers an area of 61.26 square kilometres (23.7 sq mi), and as of 2006 its total population is 4,271.

== Villages ==
Gmina Sieciechów contains the villages and settlements of Głusiec, Kępice, Łoje, Mozolice Duże, Mozolice Małe, Nagórnik, Nowe Słowiki, Opactwo, Sieciechów, Słowiki-Folwark, Stare Słowiki, Wola Klasztorna, Wólka Wojcieszkowska, Występ, Zajezierze and Zbyczyn.

== Neighboring gminas ==
Gmina Sieciechów is bordered by the town of Dęblin and by the gminas of Garbatka-Letnisko, Gniewoszów, Kozienice, Puławy and Stężyca.
