= Nagórnik =

Nagórnik may refer to the following places in Poland:

- Nagórnik, Lower Silesian Voivodeship (south-west Poland)
- Nagórnik, Masovian Voivodeship (east-central Poland)
