= Witnica, West Pomeranian Voivodeship =

Witnica
- Village
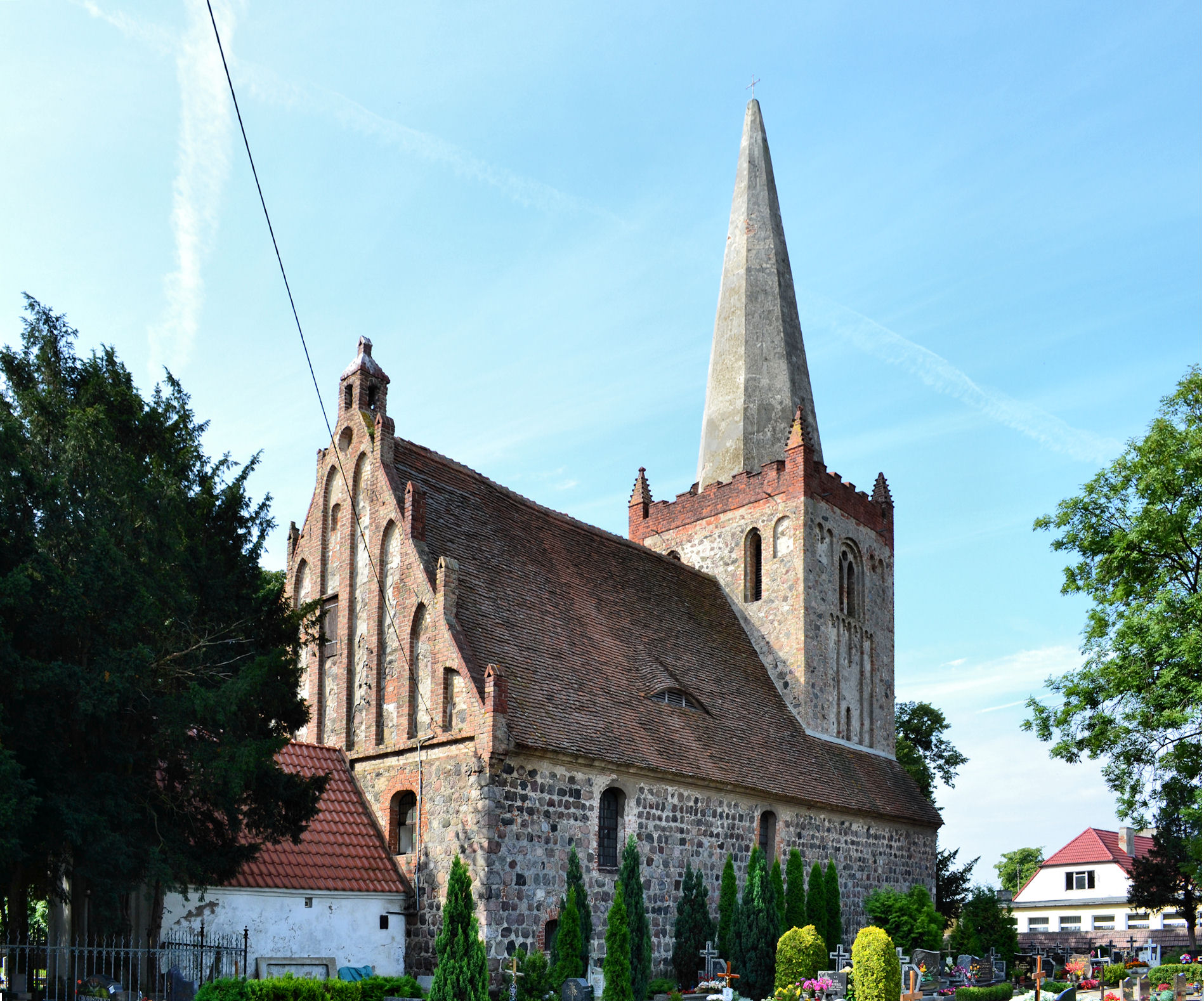
- Church of Christ the King

- Location within Poland
- Coordinates: 52°52′8″N 14°28′28″E
- Country: Poland
- Voivodeship: West Pomeranian
- County: Gryfino
- Gmina: Moryń

Witnica [vitˈnit͡sa] (German: Vietnitz) is a village in the administrative district of Gmina Moryń, within Gryfino County, West Pomeranian Voivodeship, in north-western Poland. It lies approximately 6 km (4 mi) east of Moryń, 43 km (27 mi) south of Gryfino, and 62 km (39 mi) south of the regional capital Szczecin.

For the history of the region, see History of Pomerania.
