= Klępicz =

- Village
- Location within Poland
- Coordinates: 52°52′26″N 14°18′36″E
- Country: Poland
- Voivodeship: West Pomeranian
- County: Gryfino
- Gmina: Moryń

Klępicz [ˈklɛmpit͡ʂ] (German: Klemzow) is a village in the administrative district of Gmina Moryń, within Gryfino County, West Pomeranian Voivodeship, in north-western Poland. It lies approximately 6 km (4 mi) west of Moryń, 44 km (27 mi) south of Gryfino, and 63 km (39 mi) south of the regional capital Szczecin.

For the history of the region, see History of Pomerania.
