= Mirowo, Gryfino County =

Mirowo
- Village
- Location within Poland
- Coordinates: 52°53′54″N 14°24′56″E
- Country: Poland
- Voivodeship: West Pomeranian
- County: Gryfino
- Gmina: Moryń

Mirowo [miˈrɔvɔ] (German: Woltersdorf) is a village in the administrative district of Gmina Moryń, Gryfino County, West Pomeranian Voivodeship, in north-western Poland. It lies approximately 5 km (3 mi) north of Moryń, 40 km (25 mi) south of Gryfino, and 59 km (37 mi) south of the regional capital Szczecin.

For the history of the region, see History of Pomerania.
