= Przyjezierze, Gryfino County =

Przyjezierze
- Village
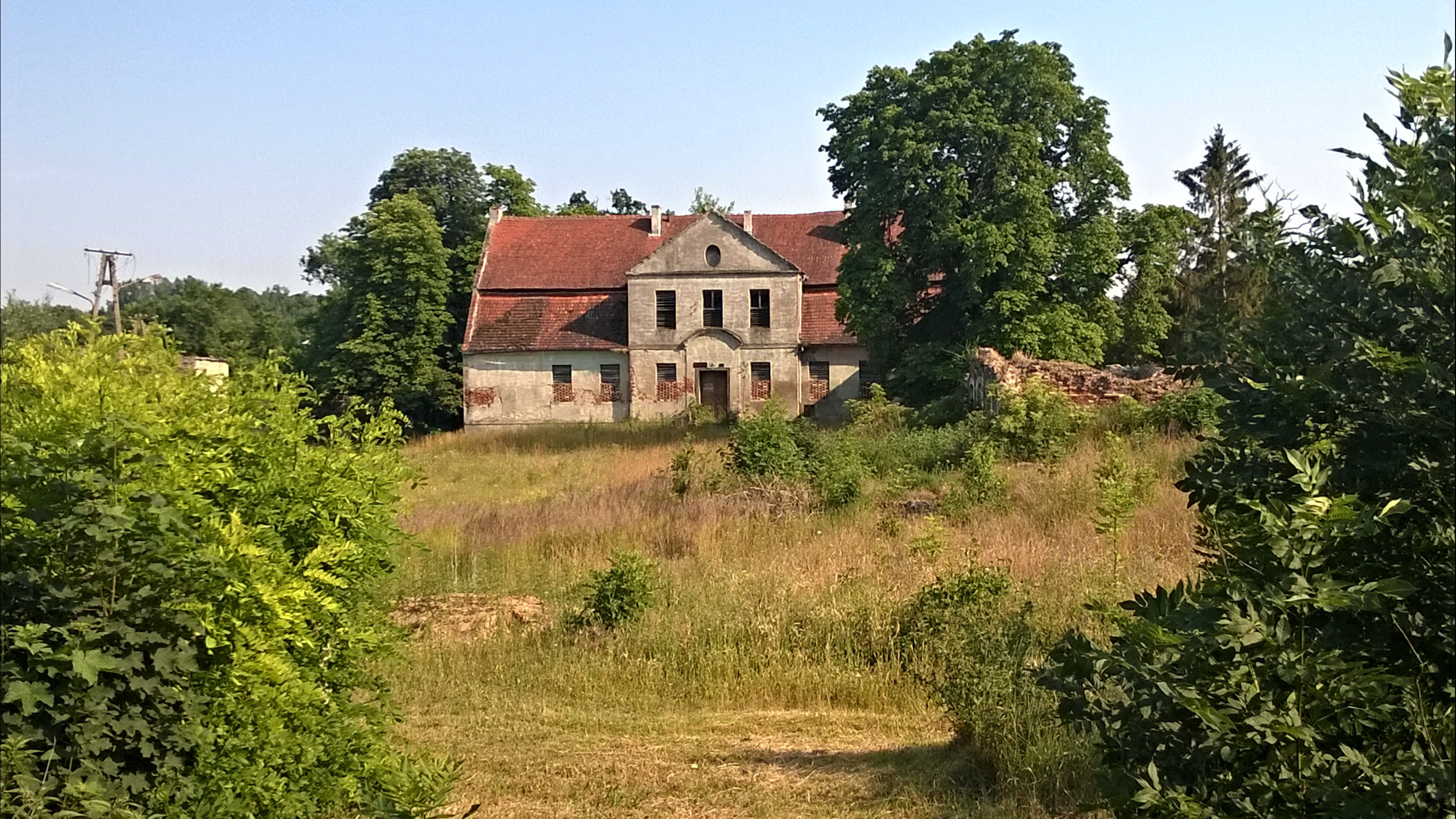
- Old manor house

- Location within Poland
- Coordinates: 52°52′16″N 14°23′15″E
- Country: Poland
- Voivodeship: West Pomeranian
- County: Gryfino
- Gmina: Moryń

Government
  - Sołtys: Jarosław Przybył
- Population (2024): 247

Przyjezierze [pʂɨjɛˈʑɛʐɛ] (German: Butterfelde) is a village in Gmina Moryń, within Gryfino County, West Pomeranian Voivodeship, in north-western Poland. It lies approximately 2 km (1 mi) north of Moryń, 43 km (27 mi) south of Gryfino, and 62 km (39 mi) south of the regional capital Szczecin. It lies on the northern shore of Morzycko Lake.

== History ==
Przyjezierze, then known by its German name Butterfelde, was its own municipality before 1945 with an area of 5,837 km^{2} (2,254 sq mi) as of 1931. The municipality also contained another, far smaller, settlement by the former train station named Butterfelde Bahnhof, that was located about 400 m (1,312 ft) west of the main village and had a population of 13 in 1895; this settlement is now unnamed and is no longer separately designated.

After the flight and expulsion of Germans from the area as a consequence of World War II, the settlement was given its modern Polish name "Przyjezierze". Between 1975 and 1998, Przyjezierze was part of the Szczecin Voivodeship.

== Demographics ==
The village has a population of 247 as of 2024.

Historical population

Year	Pop.	±%
1895	98	—
1910	97	−1.0%
1925	279	+187.6%
1933	273	−2.2%
1939	244	−10.6%
2010	274	+12.3%
2011	273	−0.4%
2012	263	−3.7%
2013	262	−0.4%
2014	262	+0.0%

Year	Pop.	±%
2015	265	+1.1%
2016	258	−2.6%
2017	268	+3.9%
2018	262	−2.2%
2019	260	−0.8%
2020	258	−0.8%
2021	258	+0.0%
2022	249	−3.5%
2023	249	+0.0%
2024	247	−0.8%

Data may be affected by territorial fluctuation.
Sources: 1895–1925, 1933 & 1939, 2010–2024

== Politics ==
As of 2025, the current sołtys (village head) of Przyjezierze is Jarosław Przybył who entered office on 12 June 2024. The village council consists of five members.

== Culture ==
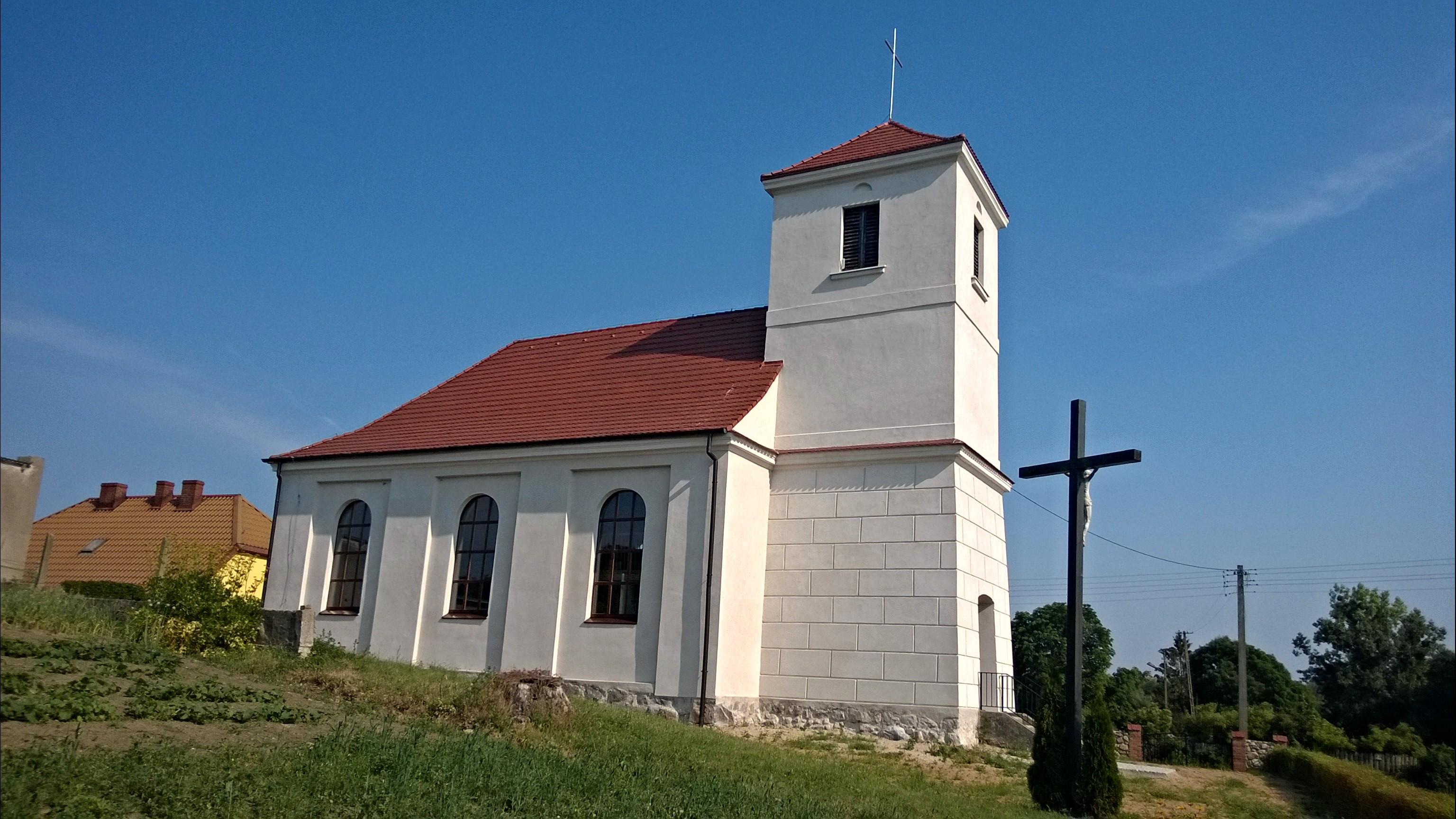
Church of Our Lady of Częstochowa

The village church is the Catholic Church of Our Lady of Częstochowa built in 1410 and renovated in the early 19th century. It has two bells, one from 1804 and one from 1918. Przyjezierze is also home to a 17th century manor house.
