= Dolsko, West Pomeranian Voivodeship =

Dolsko
- Village
- Location within Poland
- Coordinates: 52°53′59″N 14°22′32″E
- Country: Poland
- Voivodeship: West Pomeranian
- County: Gryfino
- Gmina: Moryń

Dolsko [ˈdɔlskɔ] (German: Dölzig) is a village in the administrative district of Gmina Moryń, within Gryfino County, West Pomeranian Voivodeship, in north-western Poland. It lies approximately 5 km (3 mi) north of Moryń, 40 km (25 mi) south of Gryfino, and 60 km (37 mi) south of the regional capital Szczecin.

For the history of the region, see History of Pomerania.
