= Święcica =

Święcica may refer to the following places:

- Święcica, Lublin Voivodeship (east Poland)
- Święcica, Sandomierz County in Świętokrzyskie Voivodeship (south-central Poland)
- Święcica, Staszów County in Świętokrzyskie Voivodeship (south-central Poland)
- Święcica, former name of Wola Klasztorna in Kozienice County, Masovian Voivodeship.
