= Nowe Objezierze =

- Village
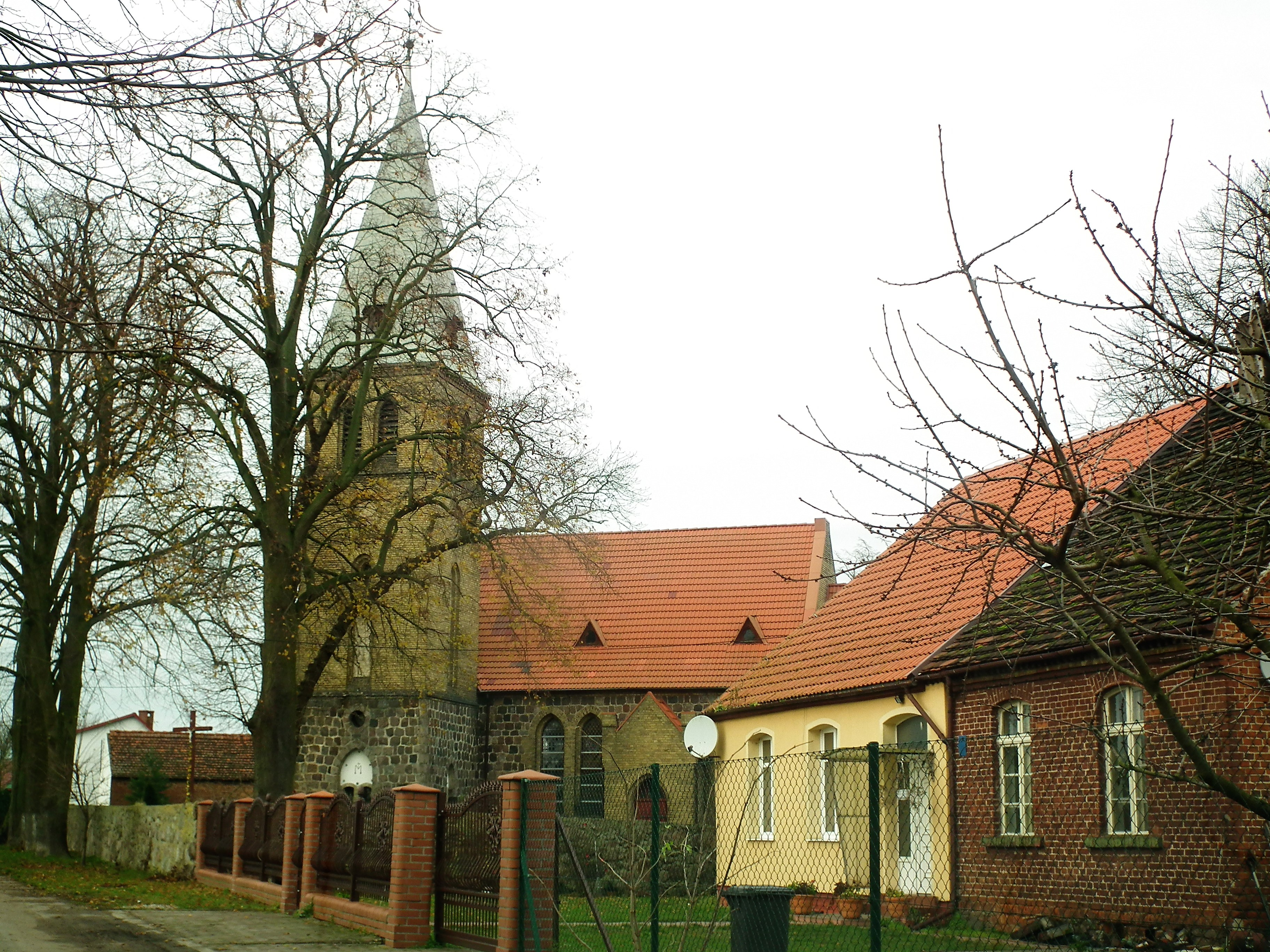
- Church of the Assumption of the Virgin Mary

- Location within Poland
- Coordinates: 52°51′51″N 14°19′46″E
- Country: Poland
- Voivodeship: West Pomeranian
- County: Gryfino
- Gmina: Moryń

Nowe Objezierze [ˈnɔvɛ ɔbjɛˈʑɛʐɛ] (German: Groß Wubiser) is a village in the administrative district of Gmina Moryń, within Gryfino County, West Pomeranian Voivodeship, in north-western Poland. It lies approximately 5 km (3 mi) west of Moryń, 45 km (28 mi) south of Gryfino, and 64 km (40 mi) south of the regional capital Szczecin.
