= Voytenko =

Voytenko or Voitenko (Cyrillic: Войтенко) is a Ukrainian-based surname. It is derived from a word Voyt (wójt), which was borrowed via German Vogt from Latin advocatus. Other versions may include Wojtenko (Polish or German spelling). Notable people with this surname include:

- Anatoly Voitenko, the inventor of the Voitenko compressor
- Nina Voitenko, Ukrainian neurobiologist
- Valeri Voytenko Russian football coach and player
