= Wisław, West Pomeranian Voivodeship =

Wisław
- Settlement
- Location within Poland
- Coordinates: 52°50′56″N 14°27′20″E
- Country: Poland
- Voivodeship: West Pomeranian
- County: Gryfino
- Gmina: Moryń

Wisław [ˈviswaf] is a settlement in the administrative district of Gmina Moryń, within Gryfino County, West Pomeranian Voivodeship, in north-western Poland.

For the history of the region, see History of Pomerania.
