= Macierz, West Pomeranian Voivodeship =

Macierz
- Village
- Location within Poland
- Coordinates: 52°49′25″N 14°25′46″E
- Country: Poland
- Voivodeship: West Pomeranian
- County: Gryfino
- Gmina: Moryń
- Population: 40

Macierz [ˈmat͡ɕɛʂ] is a village in the administrative district of Gmina Moryń, within Gryfino County, West Pomeranian Voivodeship, in north-western Poland. It lies approximately 5 km (3 mi) south-east of Moryń, 48 km (30 mi) south of Gryfino, and 67 km (42 mi) south of the regional capital Szczecin.

For the history of the region, see History of Pomerania.

The village has a population of 40.
