= Sieciechów =

Sieciechów may refer to:

- Sieciechów, Masovian Voivodeship (east-central Poland)
- Sieciechów, Łódź Voivodeship (central Poland)
- Sieciechów (Sytykhiv), a village in Lviv Oblast of western Ukraine;
