= Młynary, West Pomeranian Voivodeship =

Młynary
- Village
- Location within Poland
- Coordinates: 52°53′49″N 14°27′14″E
- Country: Poland
- Voivodeship: West Pomeranian
- County: Gryfino
- Gmina: Moryń

Młynary [mwɨˈnarɨ] is a village in the administrative district of Gmina Moryń, within Gryfino County, West Pomeranian Voivodeship, in north-western Poland.

For the history of the region, see history of Pomerania.
