= Christian Friedrich Koch =

German jurist (1798–1872)

- Born: 9 February 1798; Mohrin, Prussian Neumark
- Died: 21 January 1872 (aged 73); Neisse, Silesia, Imperial Germany
- Occupation: Jurist
- Years active: 1826–1854

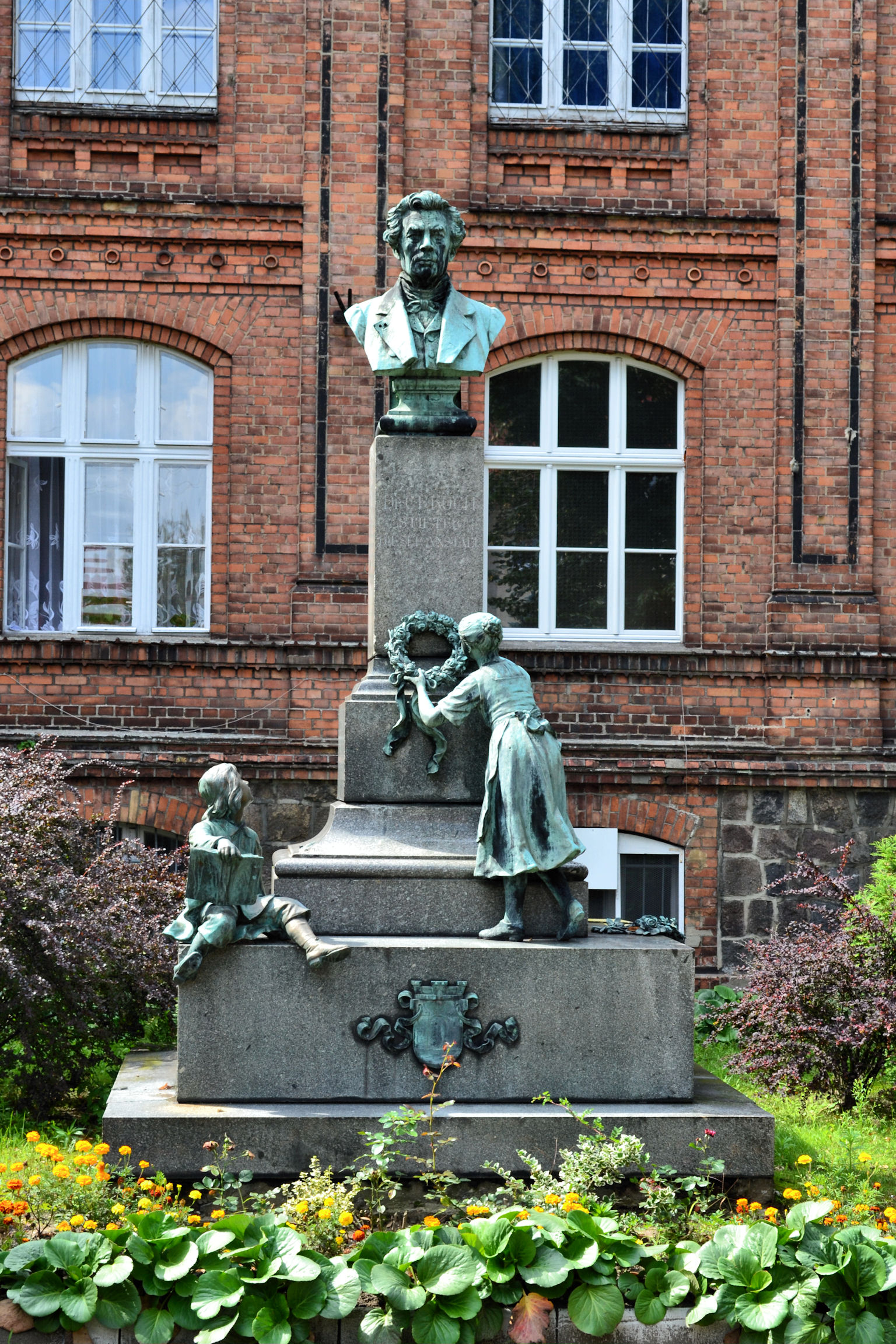
C. F. Koch memorial in his hometown

Christian Friedrich Koch (9 February 1798 – 21 January 1872) was a German jurist.

== Biography ==
Koch was born in Mohrin, Prussian Neumark, where his father was a day laborer. Koch started an apprenticeship as a tailor and worked at the same time as a copyist at the local court of Mohrin. He later worked at the Oberlandesgericht of Soldin and the local court of Reppen. Koch then passed his Abitur and studied under Savigny until 1825. His first publication in 1826 brought him immediate recognition and led to numerous appointments. He studied French law in Cologne and Aachen and was appointed justice of the supreme court at Marienwerder (1829). He was appointed director of the law courts, successively, at Kulm (1832), Grossglogau (1834) and Halle (1840). His last appointment was as director of the court of justice of the principality at Neisse. In 1848, he was summoned to Berlin to draft the new code of civil procedure. He retired in 1854 and died in Neisse, Silesia, Imperial Germany in 1872. Koch reconstructed the entire Prussian jurisprudence, upon the theory and practice of which his work exerted great influence.

Koch bequeathed the major part of his assets of about 300,000 Mark to his hometown to build an orphanage.

== Publications ==
- Versuch einer systematischen Darstellung der Lehre vom Besitz nach preussischem Recht (Berlin 1826)
- Das Recht der Forderungen nach gemeinem und preussischem Recht (Breslau, 1836–43; Berlin, 1858–59)
- Lehrbuch des preussischen Privatrechts (Berlin, 1845; 2d ed., 1857–58)
- Das preussische Erbrecht aus dem gemeinen deutschen Recht entwickelt (Prussian inheritance law derived from German common law; Berlin, 1866)
- Das preussische Zivilprozessrecht (Prussian civil law; Berlin, 1847; 6th ed., 1871)
- Kommentar zum Allgemeinen Landrecht (Berlin, 1852–55; 8th ed., 1883–87)

He was founder of the Schlesisches Archiv für die praktische Rechtwissenschaft (Berlin, 1837–46).
