= Gądno =

- Village
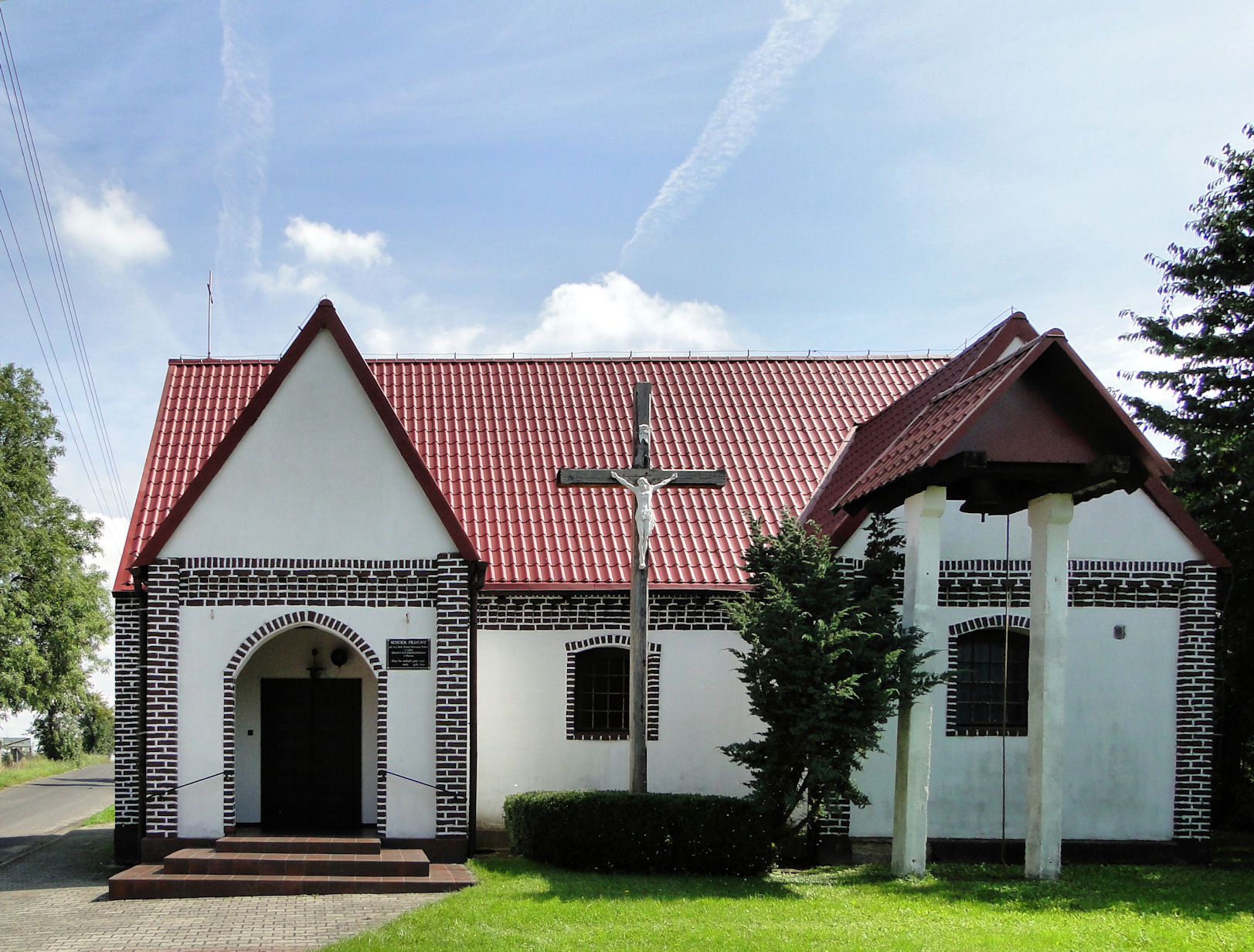
- Our Lady of Perpetual Help church in Gądno

- Location within Poland
- Coordinates: 52°51′14″N 14°25′18″E
- Country: Poland
- Voivodeship: West Pomeranian
- County: Gryfino
- Gmina: Moryń

Population
  - Total: 80
- Time zone: UTC+1 (CET)
  - Summer (DST): UTC+2 (CEST)
- Vehicle registration: ZGR

Gądno [ˈɡɔndnɔ] is a village in the administrative district of Gmina Moryń, within Gryfino County, West Pomeranian Voivodeship, in north-western Poland. It lies approximately 2 km (1 mi) east of Moryń, 45 km (28 mi) south of Gryfino, and 64 km (40 mi) south of the regional capital Szczecin.

It is situated on the eastern shore of Morzycko Lake in the historic region of Pomerania.

The village has a population of 80.
