= Starovoytov =

Starovoytov or Starovoitov (Russian: Старовойтов) is a Russian-language surname; its feminine form is Starovoytova or Starovoitova (Russian: Старовойтова). Notable people with the surname include:

- Aleksandr Starovoitov (1940–2021), Russian security services officer and academic
- Alexander Starovoitov (born 1972), Russian politician
- Alyona Starovoitova (born 1999) Russian ice hockey player
- Andrei Starovoytov (1915–1997), Soviet ice hockey administrator, referee, and player
- Galina Starovoitova (1946–1998), Soviet-Russian academic, human rights activist, and politician

== See also ==
- Starovoit
