= Zajezierze =

Zajezierze may refer to the following places in Poland:

- Zajezierze, Masovian Voivodeship (east-central Poland)
- Zajezierze, Otwock County in Masovian Voivodeship (east-central Poland)
- Zajezierze, Pomeranian Voivodeship (north Poland)
- Zajezierze, Kartuzy County in Pomeranian Voivodeship (north Poland)
- Zajezierze, Warmian-Masurian Voivodeship (north Poland)
- Zajezierze, West Pomeranian Voivodeship (north-west Poland)
