= Wąchock jokes =

Polish joke cycle

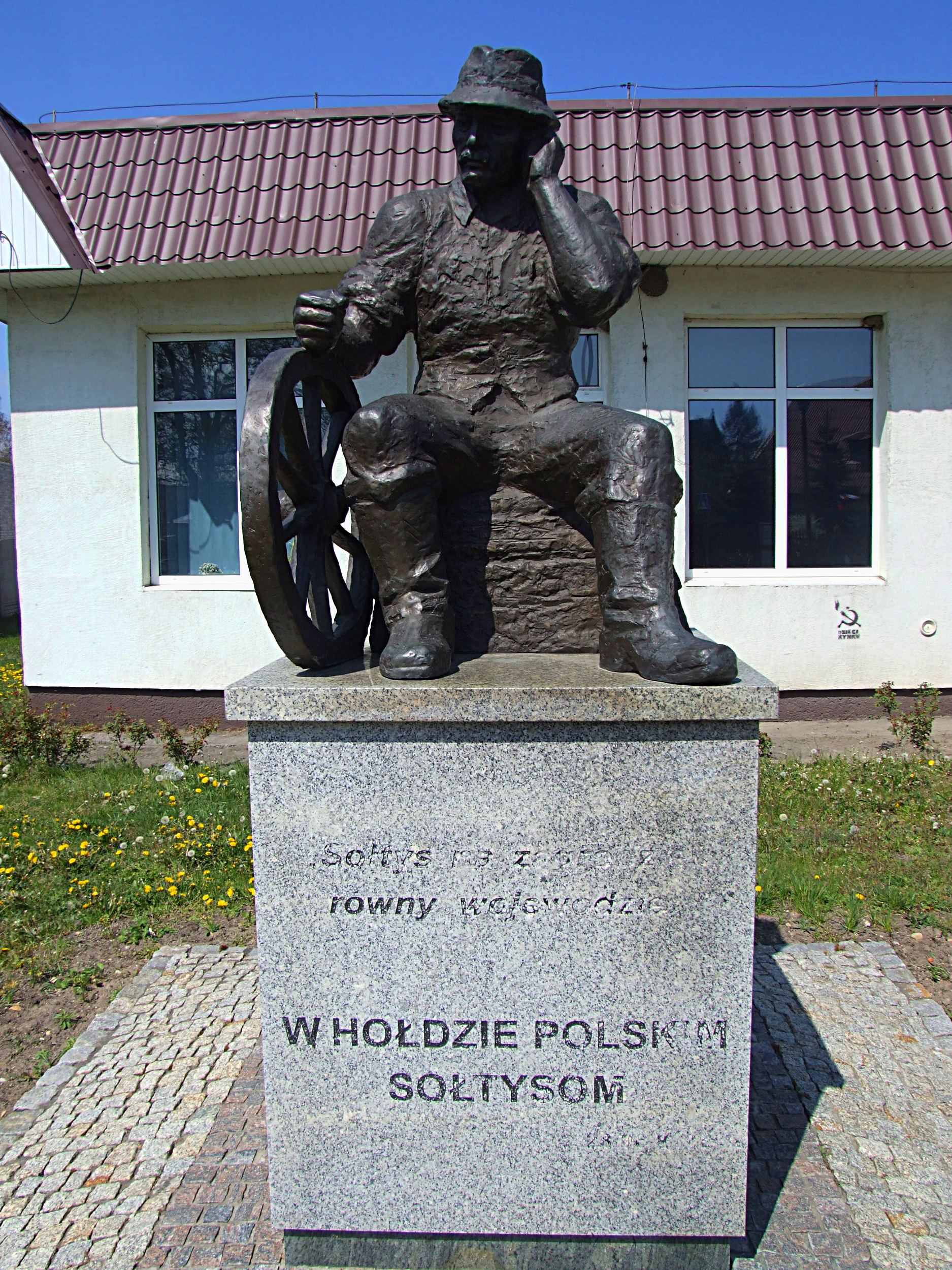
The monument to the sołtys

In Polish culture, Wąchock jokes are jokes about the inhabitants of the town of Wąchock, and especially their sołtys (referring to the times when Wąchock was a village). For example, one joke tells of a sołtys' cat so smart that when given some coffee with milk, he would drink all the milk and leave the coffee. There is no accepted explanation for when and why Wąchock became the butt of these jokes, although several theories exist.

Wąchock jokes are typically riddle jokes, for example: "Why does nobody in Wąchock watch TV? Because the sołtys put blinds on his windows."

The running joke "Wąchock for the capital of Poland!" ("Wąchock stolicą Polski!") served as one of the slogans for the Good Humor Party. It fact, for several days Wąchock was a de facto capital when during the January Uprising against the Russian Empire Marian Langiewicz, the leader of the uprising, had his headquarters at Wąchock.

In 2003, the Monument of the Sołtys was unveiled in Wąchock by the local police station. The monument depicts a mustached sołtys seated on a rock, clad in a hat and rubber wellingtons. He steadies a horsecart wheel with the right arm and holds a cell phone in the left hand. The wheel alludes to the joke on how a sołtys of Wąchock is elected: a wheel is pushed down a hill; whichever house the wheel hits first, its homeowner becomes sołtys.

After Wąchock regained its town rights in 1994, the title of its head became burmistrz; however, the members of the Friends of Wąchock Society (Towarzystwo Przyjaciół Wąchocka) established the title of "honorary sołtys", traditionally elected since the same year. Wąchock also organizes the annual meeting of sołtyses.

With a grain of humour, Józef Gębski created a documentary in 1988 about the elections of the sołtys of Wąchock, "Sołtys Wąchocka, czyli jak ponownie wygrać wybory" ["Sołtys of Wąchock, or How to Win the Elections Again"].

Various ideas have come forward attempting to turn Wąchock jokes into tourist attractions, including the following example (the joke known in several versions): if a Wąchocker needs to take a passport or self-portrait photo, he or she has to dig a waist-deep hole, step into it, and take the photo. Burmistrz Jarosław Samela suggested having a pit with the board saying "Wąchock" over it for tourists to take their photos.
