= Starovoyt =

Starovoyt or Starovoit (Cyrillic: Старовойт) is an East Slavic surname. Notable people with the surname include:

- Iryna Starovoyt (born 1975), Ukrainian poet and essayist
- Natalya Starovoyt (born 1962), Russian actress
- Roman Starovoyt (1972–2025), Russian politician

== See also ==
- Starovoytov
