= Gmina Moryń =

Gmina Moryń Moryń Commune
- Gmina
- Coat of arms

- Location within Poland
- Coordinates (Moryń): 52°51′34″N 14°23′37″E
- Country: Poland
- Voivodeship: West Pomeranian
- County: Gryfino
- Seat: Moryń

Area
  - Total: 124.86 km^{2} (48.21 sq mi)

Population (2006)
  - Total: 4,296
  - Density: 34.41/km^{2} (89.11/sq mi)
  - Urban: 1,570
  - Rural: 2,726
- Website: www.moryn.pl

Gmina Moryń is an urban-rural gmina (administrative district) in Gryfino County, West Pomeranian Voivodeship, in north-western Poland. Its seat is the town of Moryń, which lies approximately 44 kilometres (27 mi) south of Gryfino and 64 km (40 mi) south of the regional capital Szczecin.

The gmina covers an area of 124.86 square kilometres (48.2 sq mi), and as of 2006 its total population is 4,296 (out of which the population of Moryń amounts to 1,570, and the population of the rural part of the gmina is 2,726).

The gmina contains part of the protected area called Cedynia Landscape Park.

== Villages ==
Apart from the town of Moryń, Gmina Moryń contains the villages and settlements of Bielin, Dolsko, Gądno, Klępicz, Macierz, Mierno, Mirowo, Młynary, Moryń-Dwór, Niwka, Nowe Objezierze, Przyjezierze, Skotnica, Stare Objezierze, Wisław, Witnica and Witniczka.

== Neighbouring Gminas ==
Gmina Moryń is bordered by the gminas of Cedynia, Chojna and Mieszkowice.
