= Cedynia Landscape Park =

Protected area in Poland

- Cedyński Park Krajobrazowy
- IUCN category V (protected landscape/seascape)
- Location within West Pomeranian Voivodeship Location within Poland
- Location: West Pomeranian Voivodeship
- Coordinates: 52°56′N 14°13′E
- Area: 308.5 km^{2} (119.1 sq mi)
- Established: 1 April 1993

Cedynia Landscape Park (Polish: Cedyński Park Krajobrazowy) is a protected area (Landscape Park) located in north-western Poland, adjacent to the German border. It was established on 1 April 1993, by order of the governor (voivode) of the then Szczecin Voivodeship. The Park covers an area of 308.5 square kilometres (119.1 sq mi). It also has a buffer zone (otulina) covering 531.2 square kilometres (205.1 sq mi).

The Park lies within West Pomeranian Voivodeship, in Gryfino County (Gmina Cedynia, Gmina Chojna, Gmina Mieszkowice and Gmina Moryń). Its buffer zone also includes parts of Gmina Trzcińsko-Zdrój and Gmina Widuchowa). The Park lies on the Polish side of part of the lower stretches of the Oder (Odra) river.

The Park's managing authority is called Zespół Parków Krajobrazowych Doliny Dolnej Odry ("Complex of Landscape Parks of the Lower Odra Valley"). The same authority oversees the Lower Odra Valley Landscape Park, Szczecin Landscape Park and Ujście Warty Landscape Park.

Within the Landscape Park are seven nature reserves.

There are 8 nature reserves in the park:

- „Bielinek”
- „Dąbrowa Krzymowska”
- „Dolina Świergotki”
- „Jeziora Siegniewskie”
- „Olszyna Źródliskowa pod Lubiechowem Dolnym”
- „Olszyny Ostrowskie”
- „Wrzosowiska Cedyńskie im. inż. Wiesława Czyżewskiego”
- „Słoneczne Wzgórza”
