= Moryń =

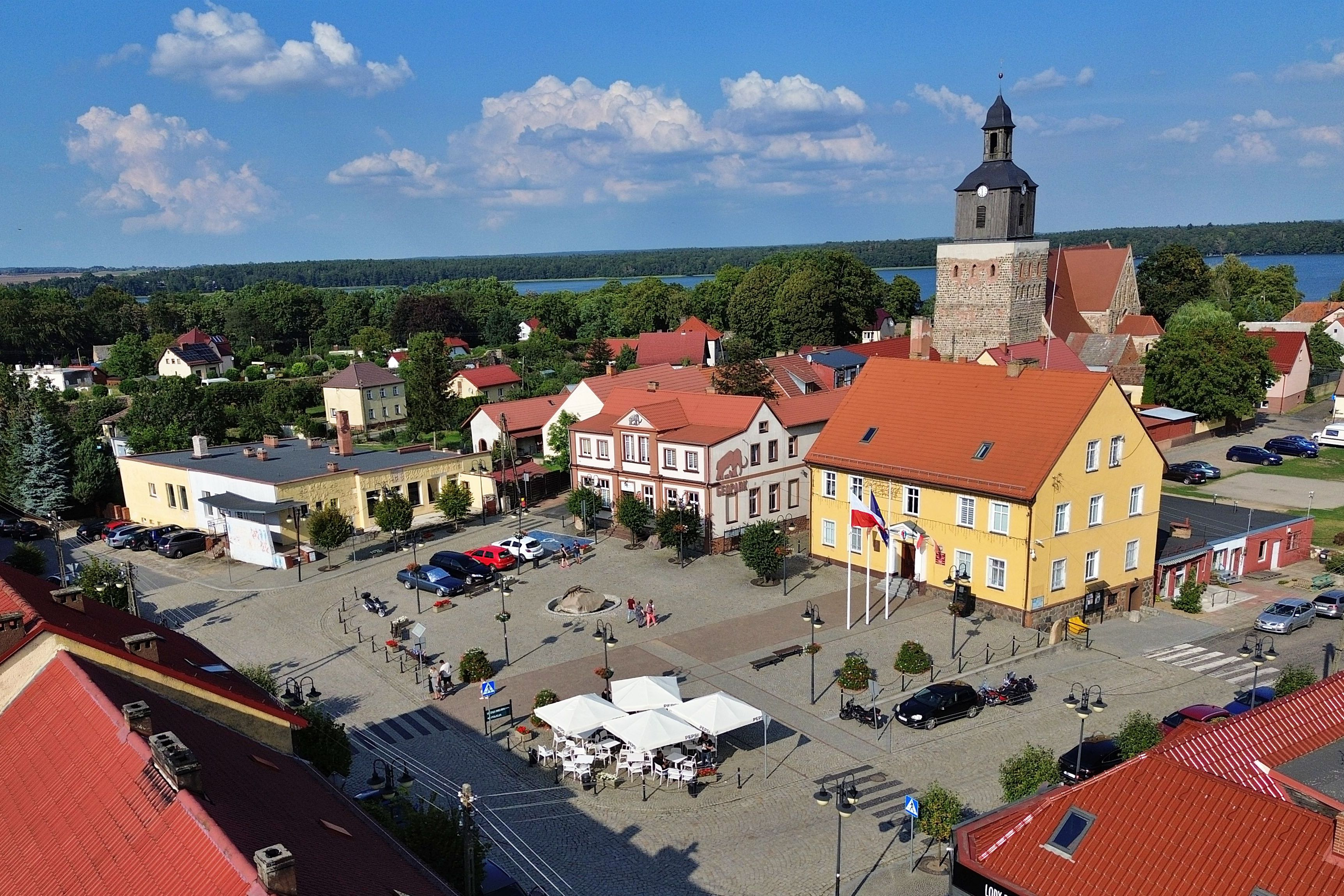
- Market square

- Coat of arms

- Location within Poland
- Coordinates: 52°51′34″N 14°23′37″E
- Country: Poland
- Voivodeship: West Pomeranian
- County: Gryfino
- Gmina: Moryń

Area
  - Total: 5.54 km^{2} (2.14 sq mi)

Population (2024)
  - Total: 1,618
  - Density: 292/km^{2} (756/sq mi)
- Time zone: UTC+1 (CET)
  - Summer (DST): UTC+2 (CEST)
- Postal code: 74-503
- Website: http://www.moryn.pl/

Moryń ([ˈmɔrɨɲ], German: Mohrin) is a town in Gryfino County, West Pomeranian Voivodeship, in northwestern Poland. Situated near the German border, it possesses an old town with a medieval street layout surrounded by well-preserved defensive walls and gates dating back to the early 14th century.

== Geography ==
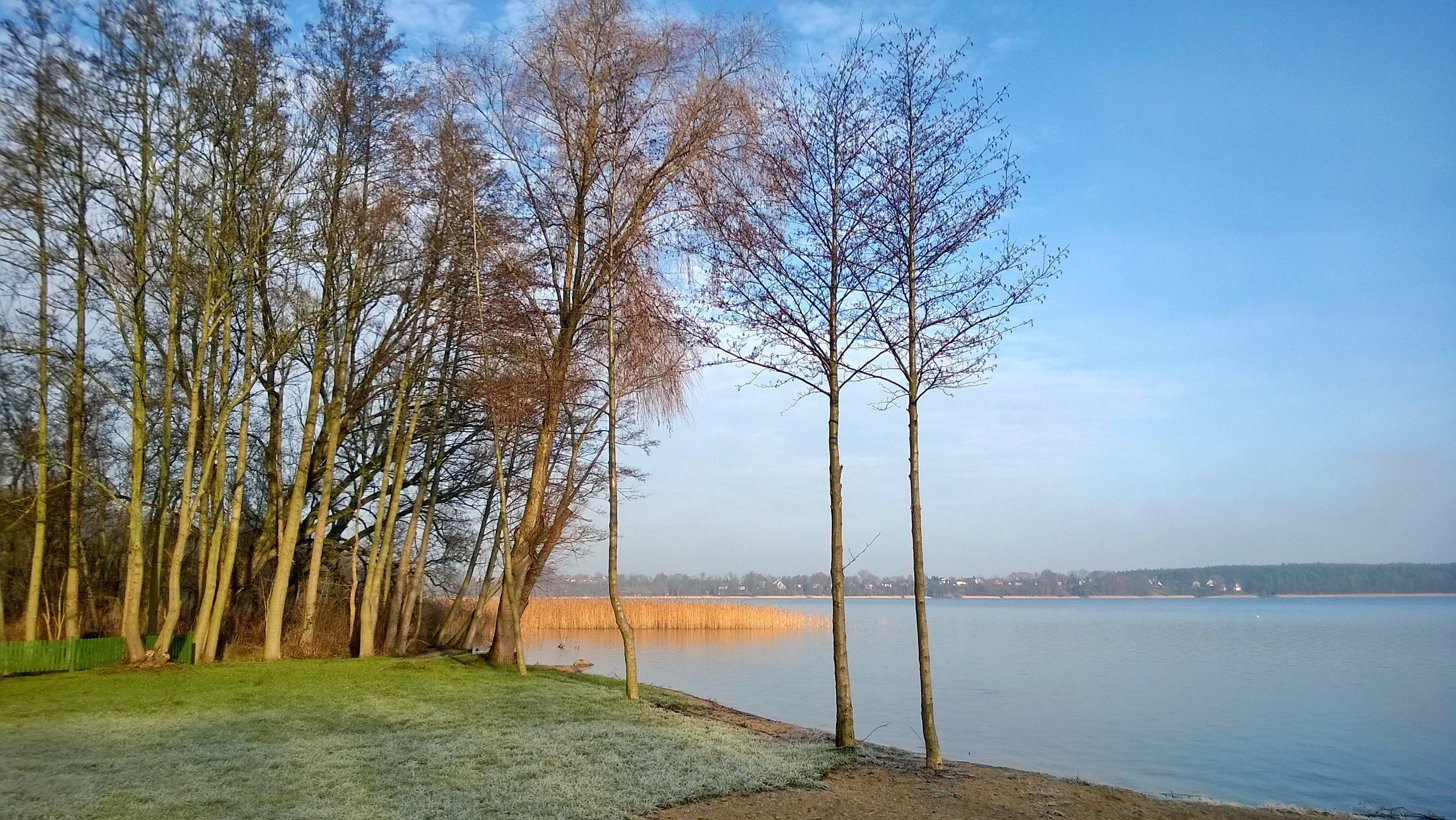
Morzycko Lake

Historically it is located in the border area between medieval Greater Poland and Pomerania, which in the Late Middle Ages was annexed into the Neumark (New March, Polish: Nowa Marchia) region, and was located in its northern part in the next centuries. Moryń is located on the Słubia creek, a right tributary of the Oder River.

== History ==
The area was already inhabited in the Stone Age. In the Middle Ages the Moryń peninsula had been the site of a West Slavic fortified stronghold. Inhabited by the Polish tribes, in the 10th century it was included in the emerging Polish state, part of which it remained until the late 13th century, when it was annexed by the Margraviate of Brandenburg. The settlement was first mentioned in medieval documents in 1263. It was mentioned as a town in 1306. The fortress was rebuilt in 1365 by Wittelsbach elector Otto V of Brandenburg. In 1373, with the New March region it became part of the Czech (Bohemian) Crown Lands, ruled by the Luxembourg dynasty. In 1402, the Luxembourgs reached an agreement with Poland in Kraków, according to which Poland was to purchase and re-incorporate the region, but eventually the Luxembourgs pawned it to the Teutonic Order. During the Polish–Teutonic War (1431–1435) the town was devastated during a Hussite campaign in 1433. When another Polish-Teutonic war broke out in 1454, the Teutonic Knights sold the region to Brandenburg in order to raise funds for war.

In the 17th century, during the Thirty Years' War, Swedish troops marched through the town. In the early 19th century, during the Napoleonic Wars and Polish national liberation fights, also French and Polish troops marched through the area. From 1701 it was part of the Kingdom of Prussia and from 1871 to 1945 also Germany. In 1892 Mohrin received access to the Wriezen Railway line from Berlin to Königsberg/Neumark (present-day Chojna). In the final stages of World War II, most of the population left the town, about 100 people remained, including about 60 Germans. After the defeat of Nazi Germany the town became again part of Poland and was repopulated with Poles, mostly those displaced from former eastern Poland annexed by the Soviet Union, as well as settlers from the regions of Greater Poland and Lesser Poland. War damage was removed. A municipal library was opened in 1949, initially it was located in the town hall.

== Sights ==
Among the historic sights of Moryń are the medieval town walls, the 13th-century Romanesque Holy Spirit parish church, the remains of the medieval Slavic stronghold, castle ruins, the Market Square (Rynek) with the 19th-century town hall and the Nursing Home (Dom Opieki Społecznej).

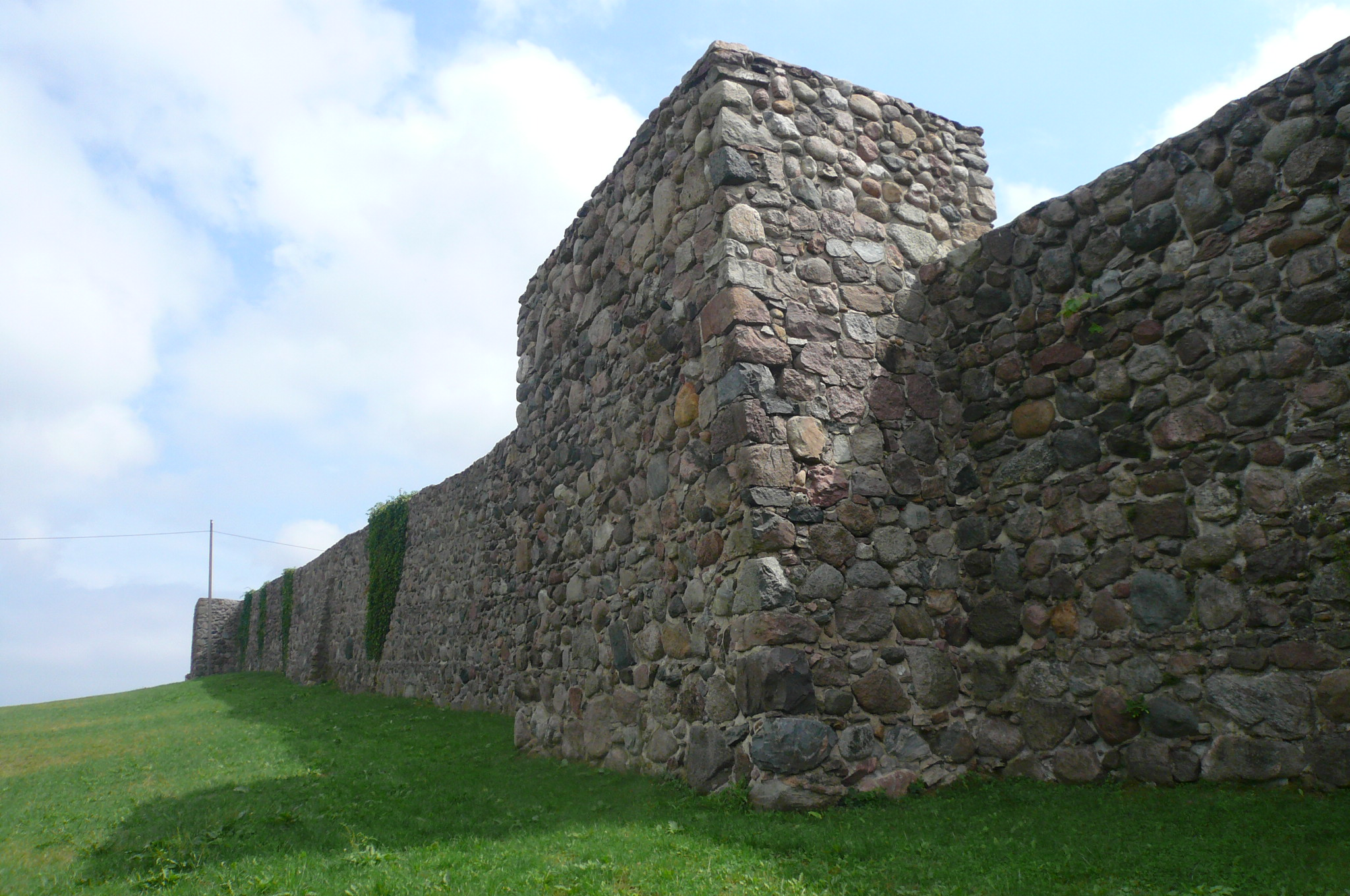
Medieval town walls

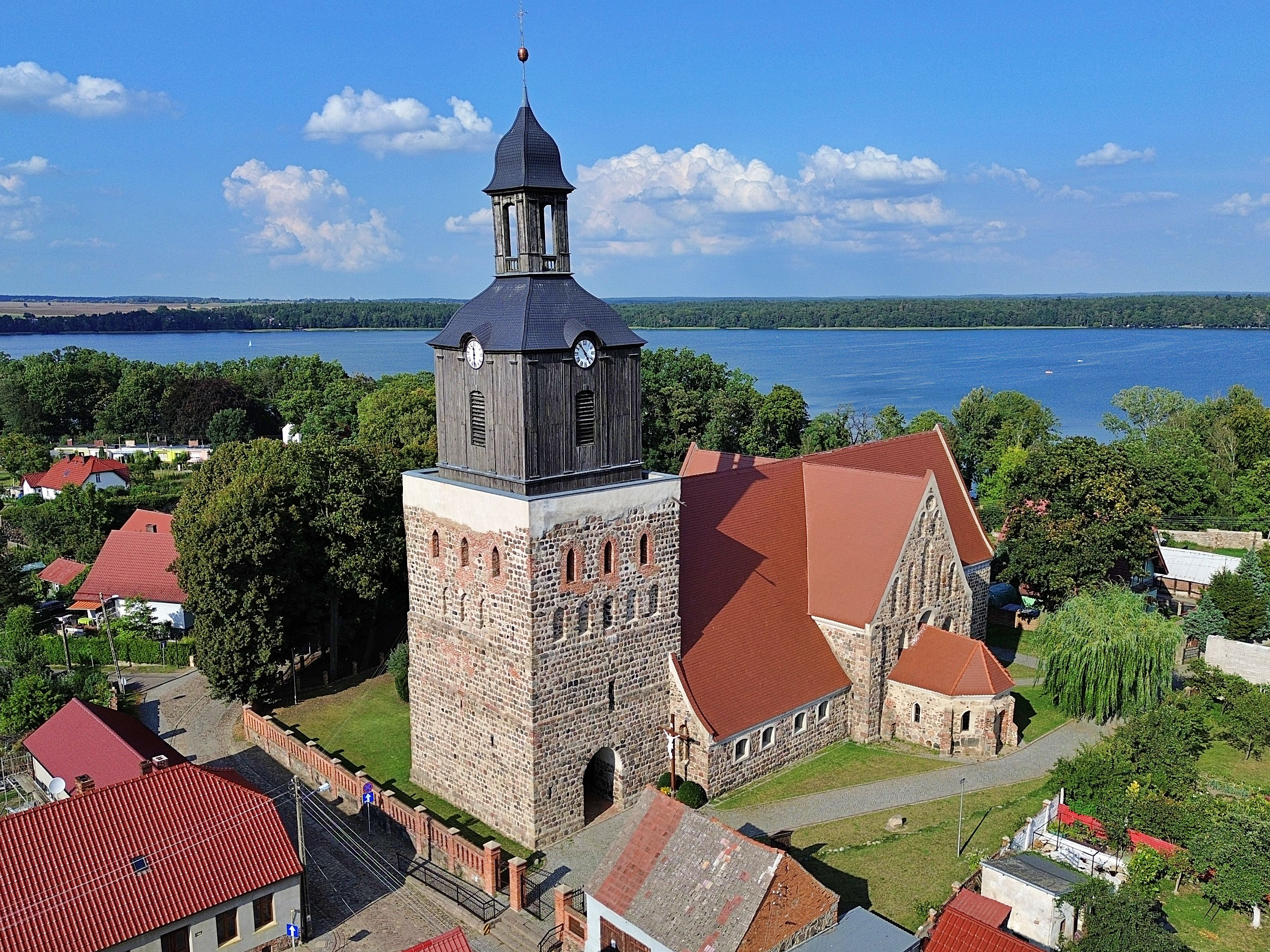
Holy Spirit church

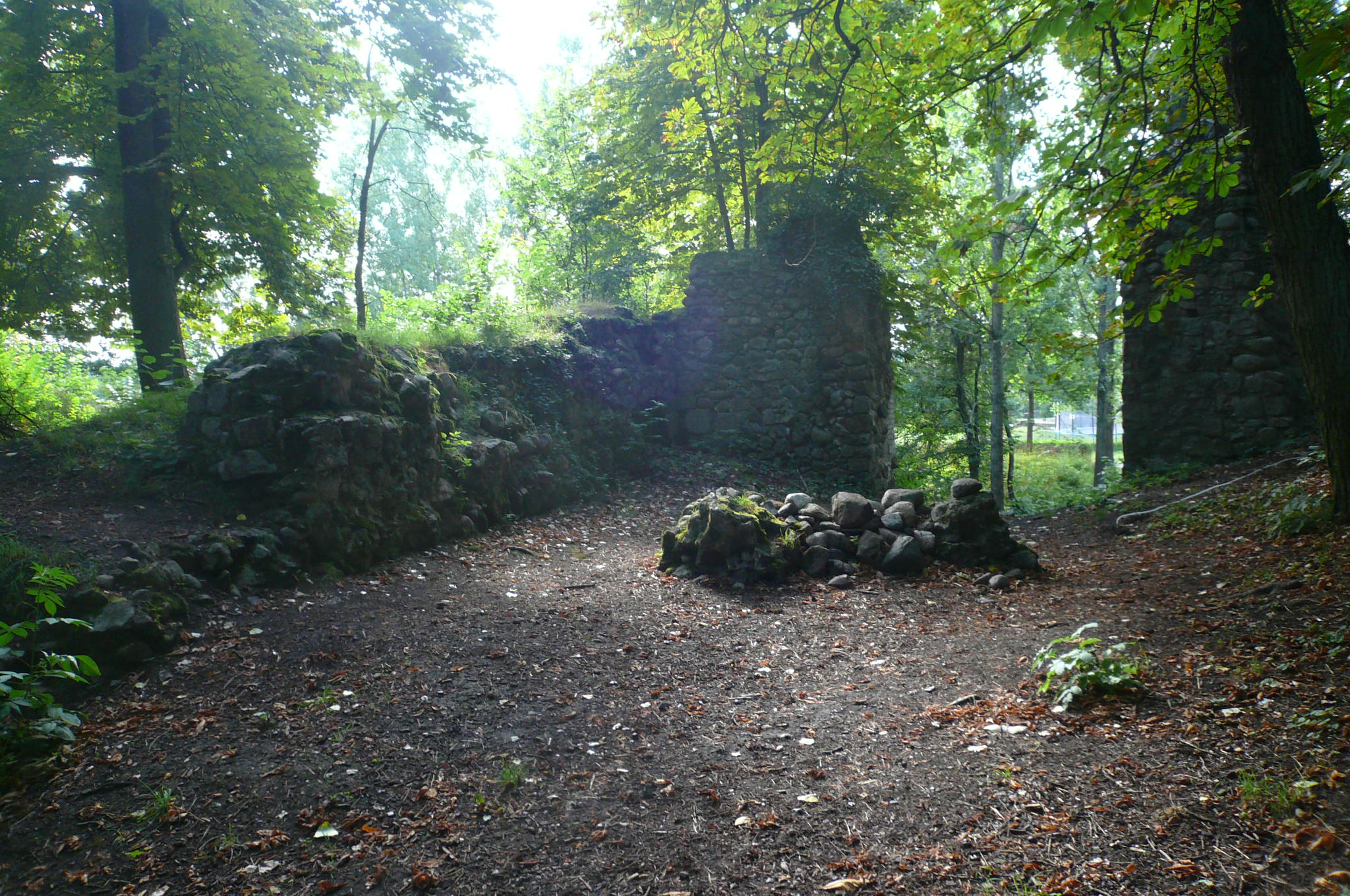
Castle ruins

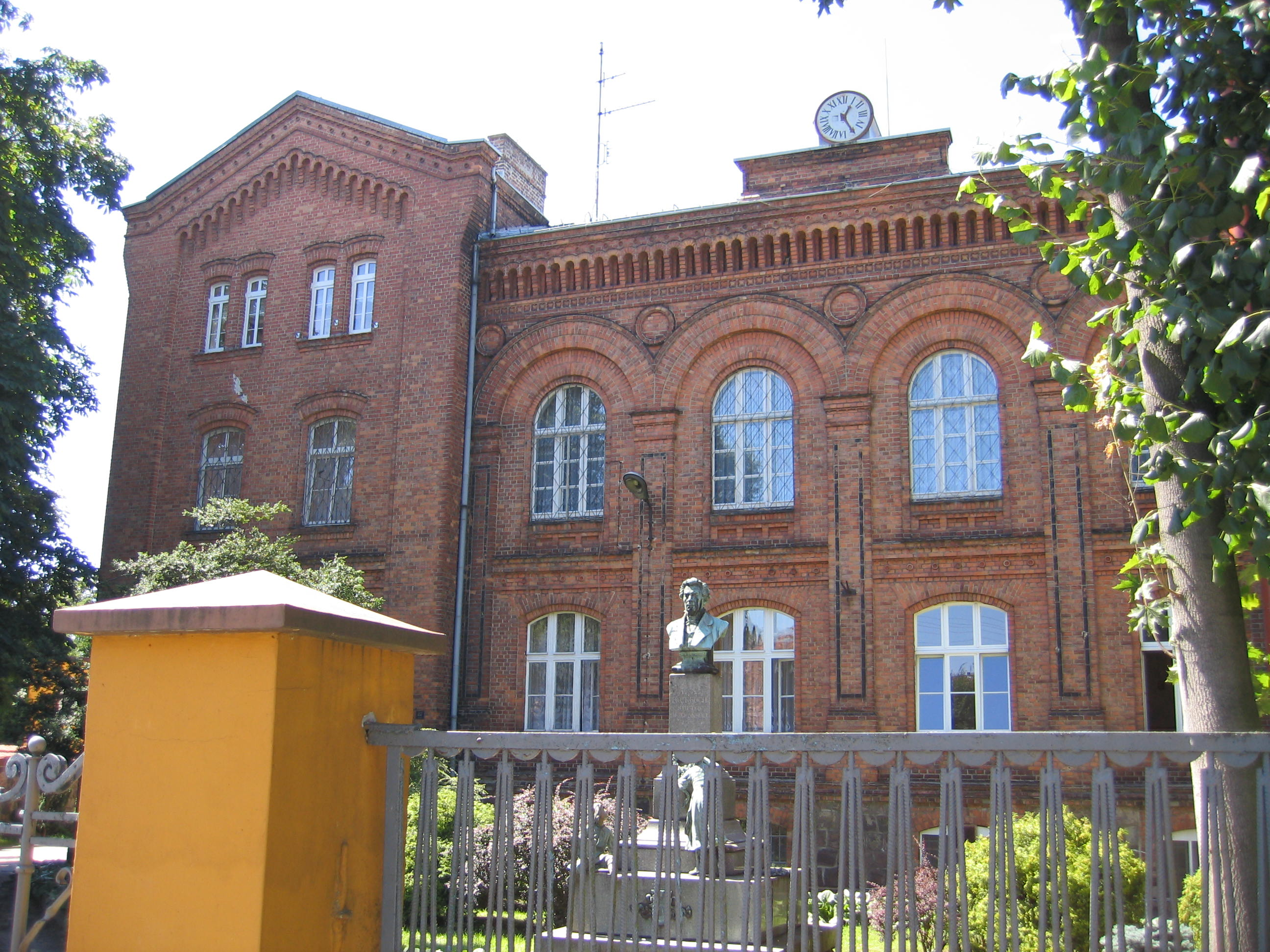
Nursing Home

== Notable residents ==
- Christian Friedrich Koch (1798-1872), German jurist
- Christopher Isherwood (1904–1986) the English author, describes spending several months in 1932 in Mohrin in chapter five of his biography Christopher & His Kind

== International relations ==
Moryń is twinned with:

- Bronson, Michigan, United States
- Joachimsthal, Brandenburg, Germany
- Schwedt, Germany
