= Wójt =

Polish senior civil administrative officer

A wójt is the highest administrative officer of a Polish rural gmina, i.e., of a commune (gmina) comprising only villages. (The head of a town or city is called, respectively, the burmistrz or "president".) Historically, the position of wójt was equal to the one of mayor in cities ruled according to the Magdeburg Law, and also existed in lands of the Cossack Hetmanate, as well as under Austrian rule.

== Etymology ==
The word wójt derives from the Latin advocatus, via the German 'Vogt'.

== History ==
In medieval Poland, a wójt (advocatus in documents written in Latin) was a hereditary (later elected) head of a town (under the overlordship of the town's owner – the king, church, or noble) or other area of settlement, which was established on or transferred to the Magdeburg rights, as well as the head of the local court (in Latin capitaneus). It this respect, a wójt was the head of the territory called "wójtship" (Polish: wójtostwo; Lithuanian: vajtija, vaitystė; Latin: advocatia). In private towns, wójts were appointed by the owner or were elected by the community.

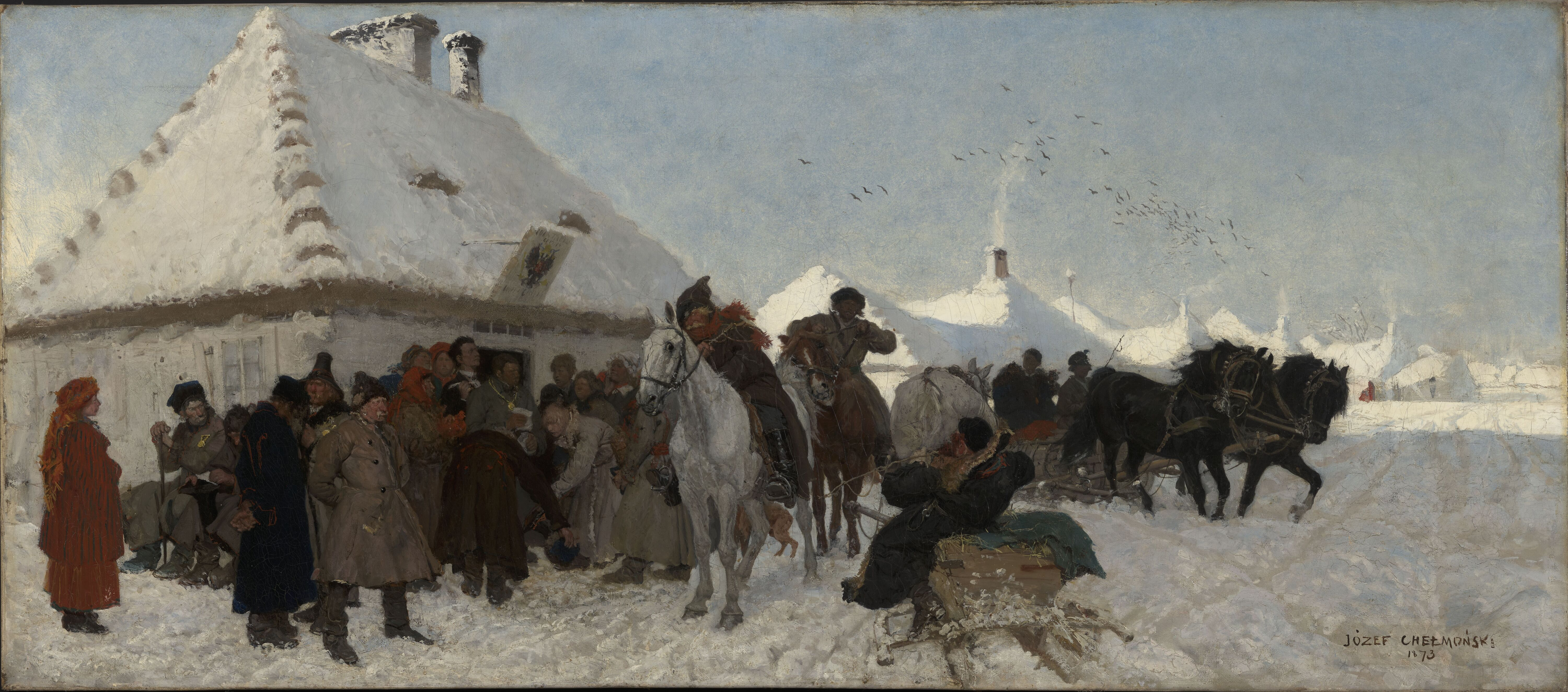
Trial before the wójt by Józef Chełmoński (1873), National Museum in Warsaw

Initially, the title of wójt was inherited. The person serving in this role received a share of local taxes and court payments in exchange. It was also possible to transfer or sell the duties of wójt to another person. In some cases, the city itself could purchase the post, with citizens receiving the right to elect the new wójt. The functions of wójt included general administrative tasks, management of communal properties and leading the jury during trials. His powers were shared with the city council, with the wójt influencing the composition if its members.

In the Cossack Hetmanate, the position of viyt (Ukrainian: війт) existed in cities ruled according to the Magdeburg Law, and people serving in that quality were to be confirmed by the hetman administration. In Austrian Galicia the term was used to denote the head of a community (hromada), and under the Second Polish Republic a wójt/viyt served as head of an aggregated community (volost).

== Wójt in modern times ==
In modern Poland the elected position of wójt of a rural gmina (in an urban gmina the equivalent positions are burmistrz and town president) is an element of the local government of the lowest level, and it is defined by the Polish law about gmina self-government.

The position of wójt is not the same as the position of the chairman of the gmina council (przewodniczący rady gminy). Wójt is the executive function of gmina (the title for the executive position is "burmistrz" if the administration is located in a gmina town and "town president" in towns with population over 100,000) (Article 26). These positions (and of their deputies) can be held only by Polish citizens and cannot be shared with the same position in another gmina or with a number of other administrative positions.

=== Relations of wójt and gmina council ===
The gmina council (rada gminy) controls the activities of wójt, determines the remuneration of wójt, directions of his activities, accepts his report on his activities, handles complaints about wójt, and may consider termination of wójt's tenure. A wójt suggests the candidate for the position of gmina treasurer, for rada to accept.

Wójt performs major actions (major purchases, credits, handling rada bonds, etc.) related to the community property according to the principles set by rada.

Wójt has rights to call for a session of rada.

Wójt or his representative has an obligation to reasonably promptly address questions and requests formally submitted by rada members.

Wójt cannot assign any contractual work to a rada member of his gmina.

=== Anti-corruption regulation ===
Neither wójt nor wójt's deputies nor persons cohabiting with wójt or wójt's deputies (the same as for other rada administration) can be part of management or own over 10% of shares of commercial businesses based in the gmina and have to submit declarations of their property. These declarations are public, with the exception of some specifics (addresses, etc.) They cannot accept any property gifts (including acquiring undervalued property) for 3 years after the termination of their functions.

=== Activities ===
Major categories of wójt's activities include:

- preparing draft resolutions of the gmina council and of development programs
- suggesting the ways of implementation of council resolutions
- management of gmina property and budget
- hiring and dismissing heads of gmina organizational units

Wójt manages running affairs of the gmina and represents the gmina on the outside and performs these duties with the help of the gmina office (urząd gminy), which wójt heads. In these affairs wójt reports exclusively to the gmina council.

Wójt has to inform the residents of gmina on draft budget and its uses and social and economic policies of gmina (Article 61).

== See also ==
- Wójtowicz/Voytovych, Starovoyt, Starovoytov, Voytenko, Voitiuk, and Voytov - surnames derived from the title (not to be confused with surnames derived from "Wojtek", which is a diminutive of "Wojciech").
- Vogt
- Sołtys
