= Telephone numbers in Poland =

- Telephone area codes in Poland
- Country: Poland
- Continent: Europe
- Regulator: UKE
- Numbering plan type: Closed
- NSN length: 9
- Format: xx xxx xx xx (geographic) xxx xxx xxx (mobile)
- Country code: 48
- International access: 00
- Long-distance: none

Telephone numbers in Poland are administered by the Office of Electronic Communications (Urząd Komunikacji Elektronicznej or UKE), the national regulatory authority.

== Geographic numbers ==
=== Number format ===
Polish telephone numbers have had nine digits since 30 September 2009. Telephone number are typically formatted in the pattern xx xxx xx xx (within Poland), which includes the area code. No prefix, such as a trunk code, is needed for calls within the country. The international format is: +48 xxx xxx xxx.

=== Area codes ===
Place	Code
Kraków	12
Krosno	13
Tarnów	14
Tarnobrzeg	15
Przemyśl	16
Rzeszów	17
Nowy Sącz	18
Warsaw	22
Ciechanów	23
Płock	24
Siedlce	25
Ministry of National Defence	26
Ostrołęka	29
Katowice	32
Bielsko-Biała	33
Częstochowa	34
Kielce	41
Łódź	42
Sieradz	43
Piotrków Trybunalski	44
Skierniewice	46
Ministry of the Interior	47
Radom	48
Bydgoszcz	52
Włocławek	54
Elbląg	55
Toruń	56
Gdańsk	58
Słupsk	59
Poznań	61
Kalisz	62
Konin	63
Leszno	65
Piła	67
Zielona Góra	68
Wrocław	71
Wałbrzych	74
Jelenia Góra	75
Legnica	76
Opole	77
Lublin	81
Chełm	82
Biała Podlaska	83
Zamość	84
Białystok	85
Łomża	86
Suwałki	87
Olsztyn	89
Szczecin	91
Koszalin	94
Gorzów Wielkopolski	95

== Mobile numbers ==
Mobile telephone number also have nine digits, starting with 4, 5, 6, 7, and 8.

- 45x xxx xxx
- 50x xxx xxx
- 51x xxx xxx
- 53x xxx xxx
- 57x xxx xxx
- 60x xxx xxx
- 66x xxx xxx
- 69x xxx xxx
- 72x xxx xxx
- 73x xxx xxx
- 78x xxx xxx
- 79x xxx xxx
- 88x xxx xxx

The same codes are used by mobile virtual network operators.

== Non-geographic numbers ==
- 70 xxx xx xx – Premium rate services
- 800 xxx xxx – Free (for callers in Poland)
- 801 xxx xxx – Shared cost numbers
- 64 x 000, 64 x xxx xxx – Paging services
- 10xx, 10xxx – Carrier Selection Code
- 802 xxx xxx – UTR VSAT, Tekstofon, Fixed SMS
- 804 xxx xxx – UAN (universal number)
- 806 xxx xxx – VPN
- 808 xxx xxx – VCC
- 39x xxx xxx – VoIP
- 20 xx xx – NDSI – dialed access to data networks incl. Internet
