= Sołectwo =

Supportive unit of a Polish gmina

A sołectwo (Polish pronunciation: [sɔˈwɛt͡stfɔ]; plural: sołectwa) is an administrative unit in Poland, an optional subdivision of a gmina. The actions and organs of the sołectwo are decided by the gmina council. On 31 December 2018 Poland had 40 740 sołectwa.

== Government and politics ==
The legislative organ in a sołectwo is a zebranie wiejskie (village meeting), and the executive is a sołtys. A sołectwo council (rada sołecka) provides support to the sołtys. The sołtys and the council are elected by permanent citizens of the sołectwo. A zebranie wiejskie is an example of a direct democracy, as the most important concerns of the citizens are addressed. Citizens' participation in these events varies significantly. The national average is 15%.

From 2010, sołectwa can also use their own budget independently if the gmina council agrees to let them do so. In 2013, half of all gminy with sołectwa adapted to the change.

== Structure ==
A sołectwo usually contains one settlement (village, przysiółek, etc.), but sometimes it contains more than one or a city has a few sołectwos inside itself.

== In cities ==
The equivalent of a sołectwo in a city is often an osiedle or a dzielnica. There are examples where sołectwa are established within city limits. As of the year 2013, 49 sołectwa were functioning in 12 city gminy. Sołectwa were used as city districts in the cities of Krasnystaw, Orzesze, Jastrzębie-Zdrój, Mikołów, Pieszyce, Zawiercie, Suwałki, Kalisz, Czarna Woda, Miasteczko Śląskie, Woźniki, Sejny and Świnoujście. Until 2013, three sołectwa existed in Warsaw's district of Białołęka.

== See also ==
- Wąchock jokes
- Settlement geography
- Municipality
- Schultheiß
