= Sołtys =

Executive branch of a sołectwo

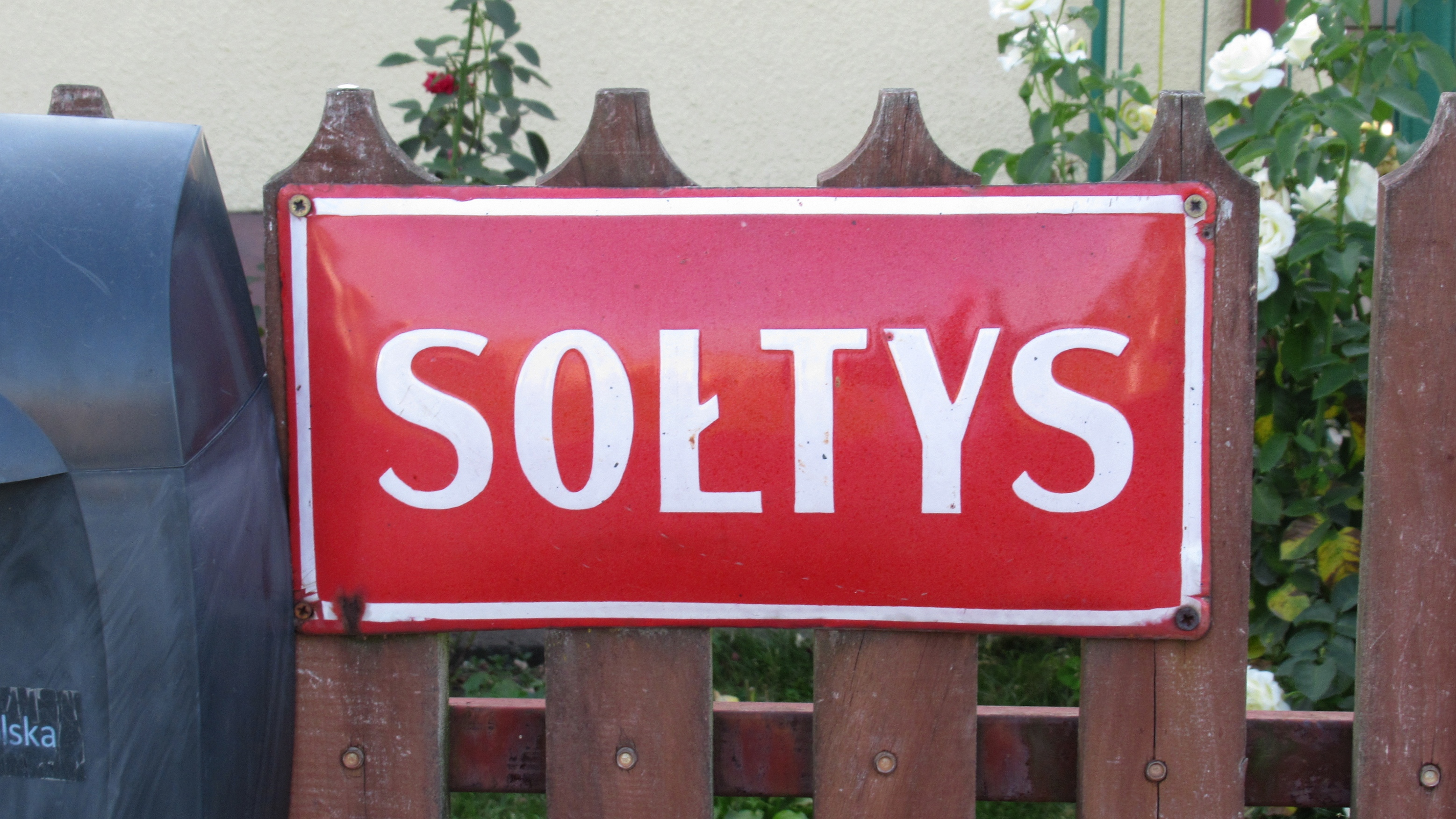
A sign representing sołtys' property

A sołtys (Polish pronunciation: [ˈsɔwtɨs]) is a head of a sołectwo elected by its permanent citizens in a village meeting (zebranie wiejskie). According to data from 2010, Poland had 40 thousand sołtys, 30.7% of which were women.

== Role and powers ==
Since 1990, a sołtys is an executive of a sołectwo that is supported by a sołectwo council. The detailed powers, duties and responsibilities of the sołtys are decided in the statute made by the gmina council. The sołtys can use the legal protection of a civil servant in his favour.

== Duties ==
A sołtys has the duty to:

- Represent the sołectwo
- Organise village meetings
- Introduce laws made by the gmina to the sołectwo
- Collect taxes
- Participate in gmina council meetings

== History ==
The office of the sołtys was introduced during the Partitions of Poland. It varied among countries. In Congress Poland, a sołtys was an executive branch of a gromada. They were supposed to guard order in the city. In Congress Poland, a gmina was made up of a few gromadas. In the Grand Duchy of Posen a sołtys usually served the role of a village owner.

In 1934, sołectwa were introduced once again to Poland, which mainly held control over business relating to the people.

In the Polish People's Republic, the role of a sołtys was replaced from 1954 to 1958 with a different position, though it was quickly changed to sołtys. A sołtys was the executive of a village government which, until 1973, ruled a gromada. From 1973 a sołtys governed a sołectwo.

== See also ==
- Schultheiß
- Wójt
- Wąchock jokes
