= Kuderewszczyzna =

- Village
- Location within Poland
- Coordinates: 53°41′N 23°14′E
- Country: Poland
- Voivodeship: Podlaskie
- County: Sokółka
- Gmina: Dąbrowa Białostocka

Area
  - Total: 3.21 km^{2} (1.24 sq mi)

Population (2021)
  - Total: 78
  - Density: 24.3/km^{2} (63/sq mi)
- Time zone: UTC+1 (CET)
  - Summer (DST): UTC+2 (CEST)
- Postal code: 16-200
- Area code: +48 85
- Car plates: BSK
- SIMC: 0026560

Kuderewszczyzna [kudɛrɛfʂˈt͡ʂɨzna] is a village in northeast Poland in the gmina of Dąbrowa Białostocka, Sokółka County, Podlaskie Voivodeship. As of 2021, it had a population of 78.

== Population ==
Historical population
Year	Pop.	±% p.a.
1988	86	—
2002	93	+0.56%
2011	92	−0.12%
2021	78	−1.64%
Source: GUS
