= Lewki, Sokółka County =

Lewki
- Village
- Location within Poland
- Coordinates: 53°39′N 23°12′E
- Country: Poland
- Voivodeship: Podlaskie
- County: Sokółka
- Gmina: Dąbrowa Białostocka

Area
  - Total: 2.62 km^{2} (1.01 sq mi)

Population (2021)
  - Total: 62
  - Density: 23.66/km^{2} (61.3/sq mi)
- Time zone: UTC+1 (CET)
  - Summer (DST): UTC+2 (CEST)
- Postal code: 16-200
- Area code: +48 85
- Car plates: BSK
- SIMC: 0026583

Lewki [ˈlɛfki] is a village in northeast Poland in the gmina of Dąbrowa Białostocka, Sokółka County, Podlaskie Voivodeship. As of 2021, it had a population of 62.

== Population ==
Historical population
Year	Pop.	±% p.a.
1988	73	—
2002	71	−0.20%
2011	68	−0.48%
2021	62	−0.92%
Source: GUS
