= Jałówka, Gmina Dąbrowa Białostocka =

Jałówka
- Village
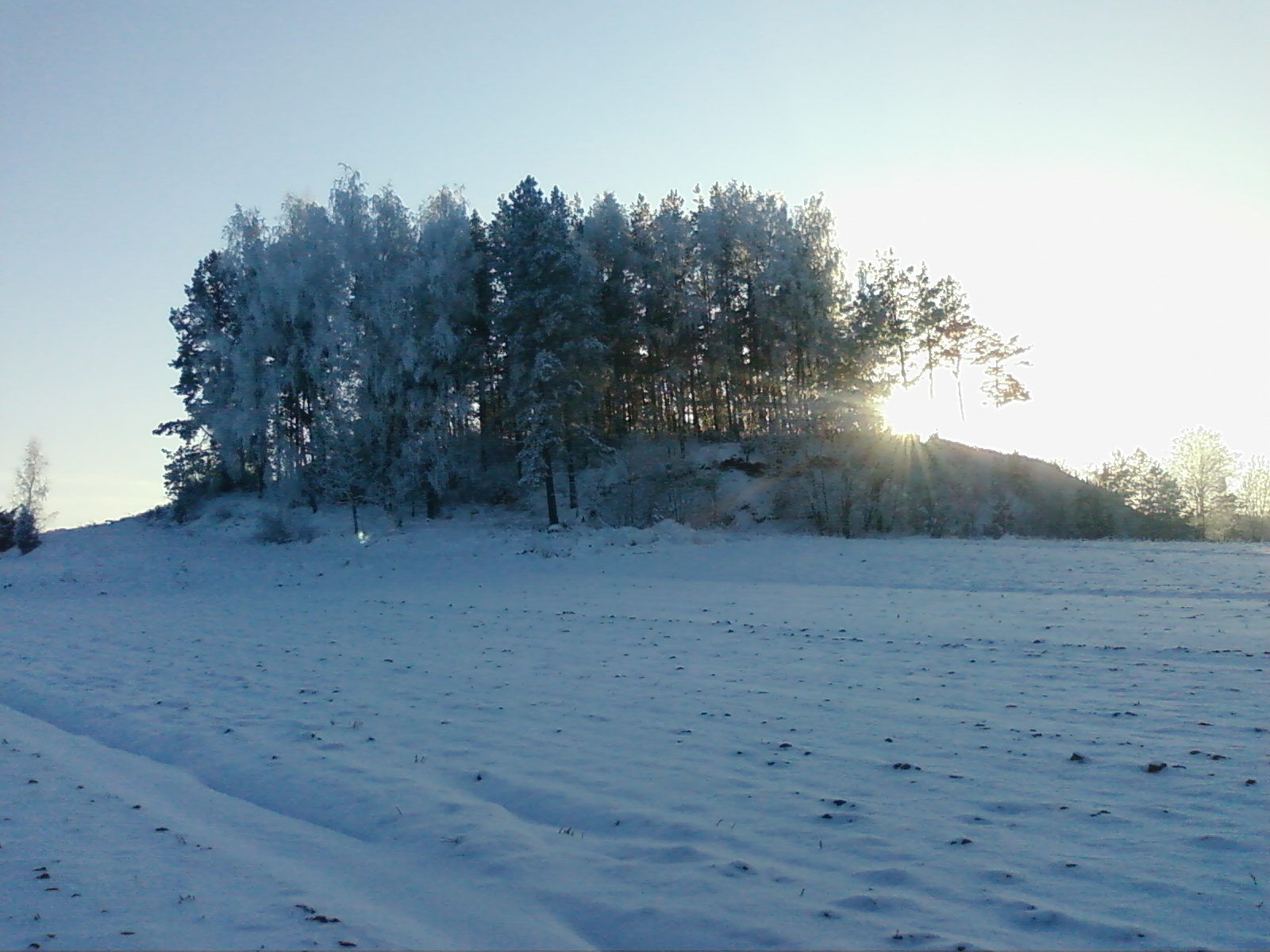

- Location within Poland
- Coordinates: 53°36′21″N 23°15′8″E
- Country: Poland
- Voivodeship: Podlaskie
- County: Sokółka
- Gmina: Dąbrowa Białostocka

Area
  - Total: 5.89 km^{2} (2.27 sq mi)

Population (2021)
  - Total: 150
  - Density: 25.47/km^{2} (66.0/sq mi)
- Time zone: UTC+1 (CET)
  - Summer (DST): UTC+2 (CEST)
- Postal code: 16-200
- Area code: +48 85
- Car plates: BSK
- SIMC: 0026525

Jałówka [jaˈwufka] is a village in northeast Poland in the gmina of Dąbrowa Białostocka, Sokółka County, Podlaskie Voivodeship. As of 2021, it had a population of 150.

== Population ==
Historical population
Year	Pop.	±% p.a.
1988	248	—
2002	221	−0.82%
2011	202	−0.99%
2021	150	−2.93%
Source: GUS
