= Nowa Wieś, Sokółka County =

Nowa Wieś
- Village
- Location within Poland
- Coordinates: 53°40′24″N 23°17′3″E
- Country: Poland
- Voivodeship: Podlaskie
- County: Sokółka
- Gmina: Dąbrowa Białostocka

Area
  - Total: 5.37 km^{2} (2.07 sq mi)

Population (2021)
  - Total: 142
  - Density: 26.44/km^{2} (68.5/sq mi)
- Time zone: UTC+1 (CET)
  - Summer (DST): UTC+2 (CEST)
- Postal code: 16-200
- Area code: +48 85
- Car plates: BSK
- SIMC: 0026666

Nowa Wieś [ˈnɔva ˈvjɛɕ] is a village in northeast Poland in the gmina of Dąbrowa Białostocka, Sokółka County, Podlaskie Voivodeship. As of 2021, it had a population of 142.

== Population ==
Historical population
Year	Pop.	±% p.a.
1988	206	—
2002	141	−2.67%
2011	163	+1.62%
2021	142	−1.37%
Source: GUS
