= Grzebienie =

- Village
- Location within Poland
- Coordinates: 53°37′7″N 23°26′10″E
- Country: Poland
- Voivodeship: Podlaskie
- County: Sokółka
- Gmina: Dąbrowa Białostocka

Area
  - Total: 10.99 km^{2} (4.24 sq mi)

Population (2021)
  - Total: 186
  - Density: 16.92/km^{2} (43.8/sq mi)
- Time zone: UTC+1 (CET)
  - Summer (DST): UTC+2 (CEST)
- Postal code: 16-200
- Area code: +48 85
- Car plates: BSK
- SIMC: 0026488

Grzebienie [ɡʐɛˈbʲɛɲɛ] is a village in northeast Poland in the gmina of Dąbrowa Białostocka, Sokółka County, Podlaskie Voivodeship. As of 2021, it had a population of 186.

== Population ==
Historical population
Year	Pop.	±% p.a.
1988	325	—
2002	283	−0.98%
2011	241	−1.77%
2021	186	−2.56%
Source: GUS
