= Grabowo, Sokółka County =

Grabowo
- Village
- Interactive map of Grabowo
- Location within Poland
- Coordinates: 53°40′36″N 23°21′30″E
- Country: Poland
- Voivodeship: Podlaskie
- County: Sokółka
- Gmina: Dąbrowa Białostocka

Area
  - Total: 6.25 km^{2} (2.41 sq mi)

Population (2021)
  - Total: 120
  - Density: 19.2/km^{2} (50/sq mi)
- Time zone: UTC+1 (CET)
  - Summer (DST): UTC+2 (CEST)
- Postal code: 16-200
- Area code: +48 85
- Car plates: BSK
- SIMC: 0026465

Grabowo [ɡraˈbɔvɔ] is a village in northeast Poland in the gmina of Dąbrowa Białostocka, Sokółka County, Podlaskie Voivodeship. As of 2021, it had a population of 120.

== Population ==
Historical population
Year	Pop.	±% p.a.
1988	197	—
2002	166	−1.22%
2011	146	−1.42%
2021	120	−1.94%
Source: GUS
