= Ostrowie, Sokółka County =

Ostrowie
- Village
- Location within Poland
- Coordinates: 53°41′N 23°24′E
- Country: Poland
- Voivodeship: Podlaskie
- County: Sokółka
- Gmina: Dąbrowa Białostocka

Area
  - Total: 7.11 km^{2} (2.75 sq mi)

Population (2021)
  - Total: 203
  - Density: 28.55/km^{2} (73.9/sq mi)
- Time zone: UTC+1 (CET)
  - Summer (DST): UTC+2 (CEST)
- Postal code: 16-200
- Area code: +48 85
- Car plates: BSK
- SIMC: 0026732

Ostrowie [ɔsˈtrɔvʲɛ] is a village in northeast Poland in the gmina of Dąbrowa Białostocka, Sokółka County, Podlaskie Voivodeship. As of 2021, it had a population of 203.

== Population ==
Historical population
Year	Pop.	±% p.a.
1988	344	—
2002	302	−0.93%
2011	258	−1.73%
2021	203	−2.37%
Source: GUS
