= Nierośno =

- Village
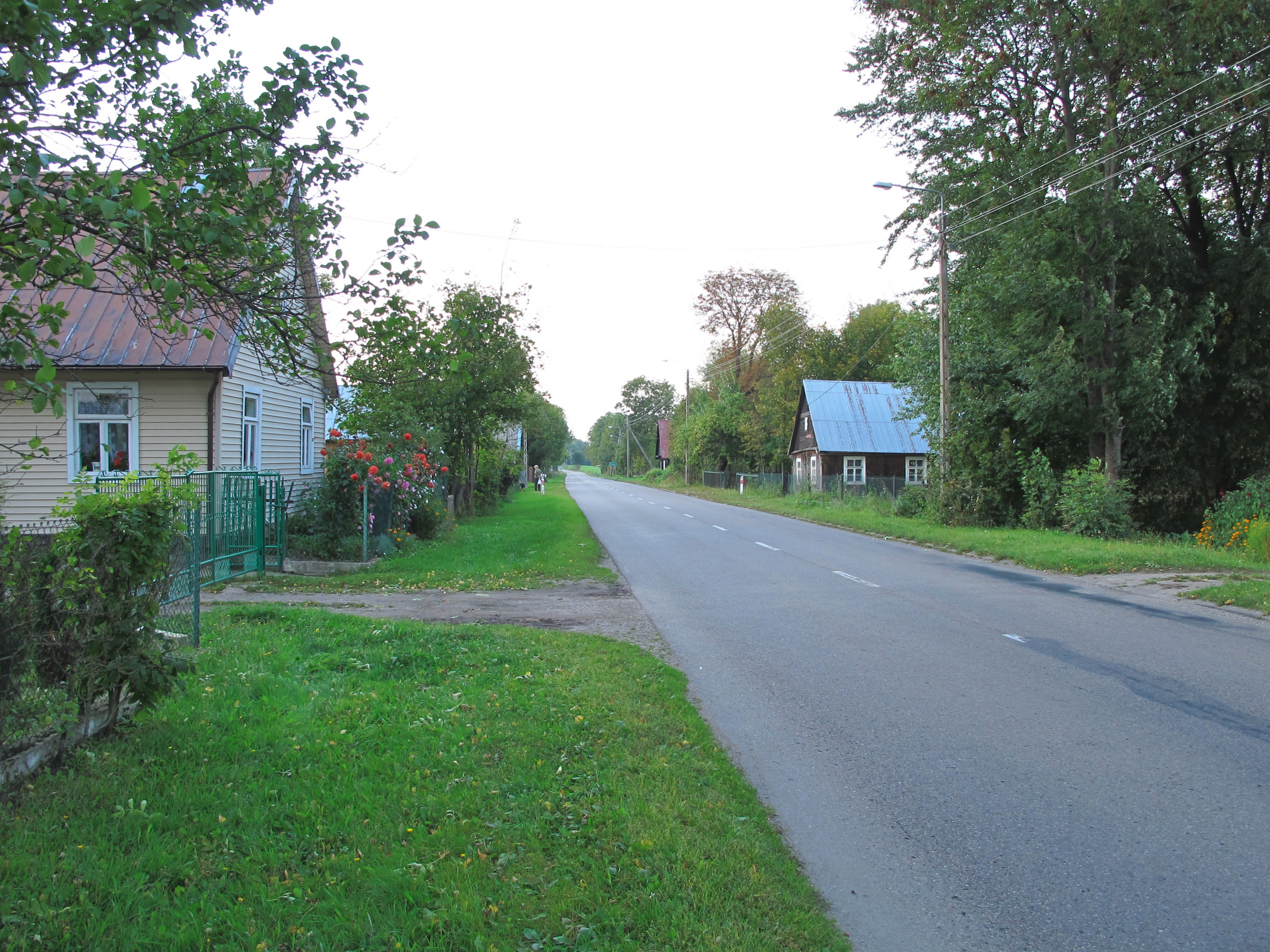

- Location within Poland
- Coordinates: 53°36′N 23°23′E
- Country: Poland
- Voivodeship: Podlaskie
- County: Sokółka
- Gmina: Dąbrowa Białostocka

Area
  - Total: 8.62 km^{2} (3.33 sq mi)

Population (2021)
  - Total: 239
  - Density: 27.73/km^{2} (71.8/sq mi)
- Time zone: UTC+1 (CET)
  - Summer (DST): UTC+2 (CEST)
- Postal code: 16-200
- Area code: +48 85
- Car plates: BSK
- SIMC: 0026637

Nierośno [ɲɛˈrɔɕnɔ] is a village in north-eastern Poland in the gmina of Dąbrowa Białostocka, Sokółka County, Podlaskie Voivodeship. As of 2021, it had a population of 239.

== History ==
Three Polish citizens were murdered by Nazi Germany in the village during World War II.

== Population ==
Historical population
Year	Pop.	±% p.a.
1988	375	—
2002	327	−0.97%
2011	294	−1.18%
2021	239	−2.05%
Source: GUS
