= Bity Kamień =

- Village
- Location within Poland
- Coordinates: 53°33′3″N 23°19′19″E
- Country: Poland
- Voivodeship: Podlaskie
- County: Sokółka
- Gmina: Dąbrowa Białostocka

Area
  - Total: 2.13 km^{2} (0.82 sq mi)

Population (2021)
  - Total: 17
  - Density: 7.98/km^{2} (20.7/sq mi)
- Time zone: UTC+1 (CET)
  - Summer (DST): UTC+2 (CEST)
- Postal code: 16-200
- Area code: +48 85
- Car plates: BSK
- SIMC: 0026436

Bity Kamień [ˈbitɨ kamʲɛɲ] is a village in northeast Poland in the gmina of Dąbrowa Białostocka, Sokółka County, Podlaskie Voivodeship. As of 2021, it had a population of 17.

== Population ==
Historical population
Year	Pop.	±% p.a.
1988	34	—
2002	29	−1.13%
2011	26	−1.21%
2021	17	−4.16%
Source: GUS
