= Kropiwno =

- Village
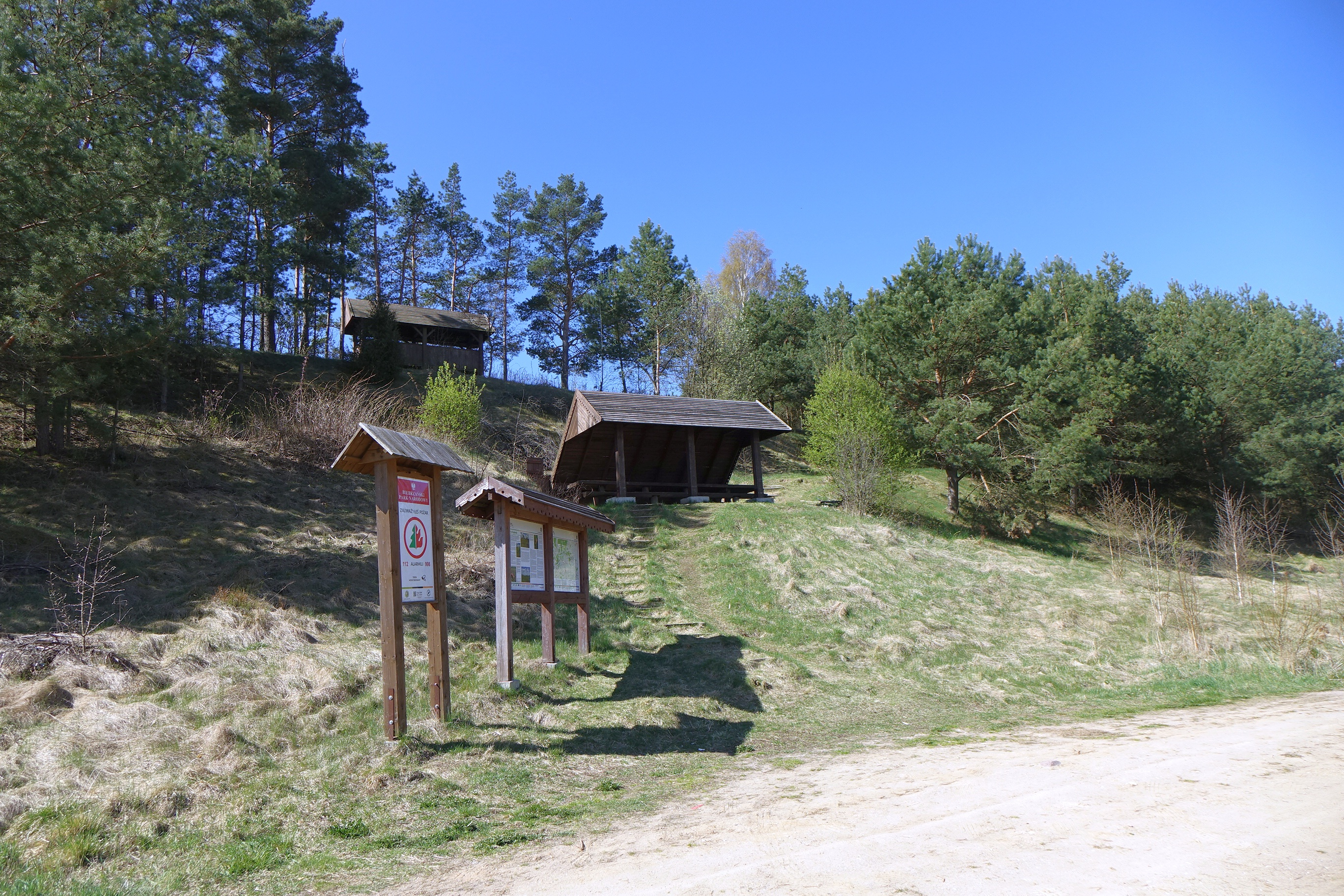

- Location within Poland
- Coordinates: 53°42′N 23°23′E
- Country: Poland
- Voivodeship: Podlaskie
- County: Sokółka
- Gmina: Dąbrowa Białostocka

Area
  - Total: 6.49 km^{2} (2.51 sq mi)

Population (2021)
  - Total: 103
  - Density: 15.87/km^{2} (41.1/sq mi)
- Time zone: UTC+1 (CET)
  - Summer (DST): UTC+2 (CEST)
- Postal code: 16-200
- Area code: +48 85
- Car plates: BSK
- SIMC: 0026548

Kropiwno [krɔˈpivnɔ] is a village in the administrative district of Gmina Dąbrowa Białostocka, within Sokółka County, Podlaskie Voivodeship, in north-eastern Poland. As of 2021, it had a population of 103.

== Population ==
Historical population
Year	Pop.	±% p.a.
1988	184	—
2002	155	−1.22%
2011	121	−2.71%
2021	103	−1.60%
Source: GUS
