= Hamulka =

- Village
- Location within Poland
- Coordinates: 53°40′49″N 23°14′14″E
- Country: Poland
- Voivodeship: Podlaskie
- County: Sokółka
- Gmina: Dąbrowa Białostocka

Area
  - Total: 1.87 km^{2} (0.72 sq mi)

Population (2021)
  - Total: 69
  - Density: 36.9/km^{2} (96/sq mi)
- Time zone: UTC+1 (CET)
  - Summer (DST): UTC+2 (CEST)
- Postal code: 16-200
- Area code: +48 85
- Car plates: BSK
- SIMC: 0026494

Hamulka [xaˈmulka] is a village in northeast Poland in the gmina of Dąbrowa Białostocka, Sokółka County, Podlaskie Voivodeship. As of 2021, it had a population of 69.

== Population ==
Historical population
Year	Pop.	±% p.a.
1988	82	—
2002	67	−1.43%
2011	67	+0.00%
2021	69	+0.29%
Source: GUS
