= Jaczno =

- Village
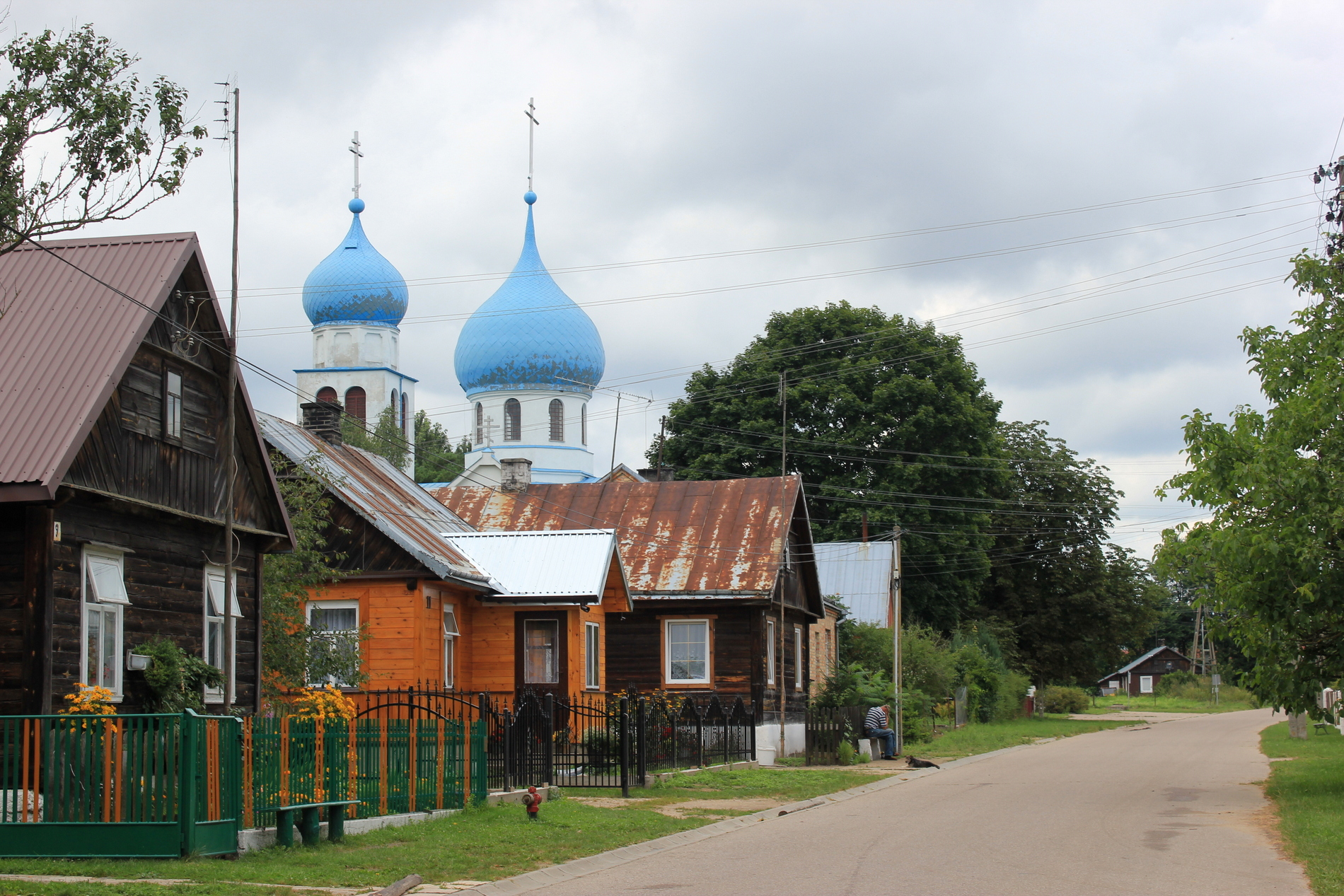

- Location within Poland
- Coordinates: 53°38′53″N 23°26′1″E
- Country: Poland
- Voivodeship: Podlaskie
- County: Sokółka
- Gmina: Dąbrowa Białostocka

Area
  - Total: 4.42 km^{2} (1.71 sq mi)

Population (2021)
  - Total: 56
  - Density: 12.67/km^{2} (32.8/sq mi)
- Time zone: UTC+1 (CET)
  - Summer (DST): UTC+2 (CEST)
- Postal code: 16-200
- Area code: +48 85
- Car plates: BSK
- SIMC: 0026519

Jaczno [ˈjat͡ʂnɔ] is a village in northeast Poland in the gmina of Dąbrowa Białostocka, Sokółka County, Podlaskie Voivodeship. As of 2021, it had a population of 56.

== Population ==
Historical population
Year	Pop.	±% p.a.
1988	119	—
2002	90	−1.98%
2011	72	−2.45%
2021	56	−2.48%
Source: GUS
