= Kamienna Nowa =

- Village
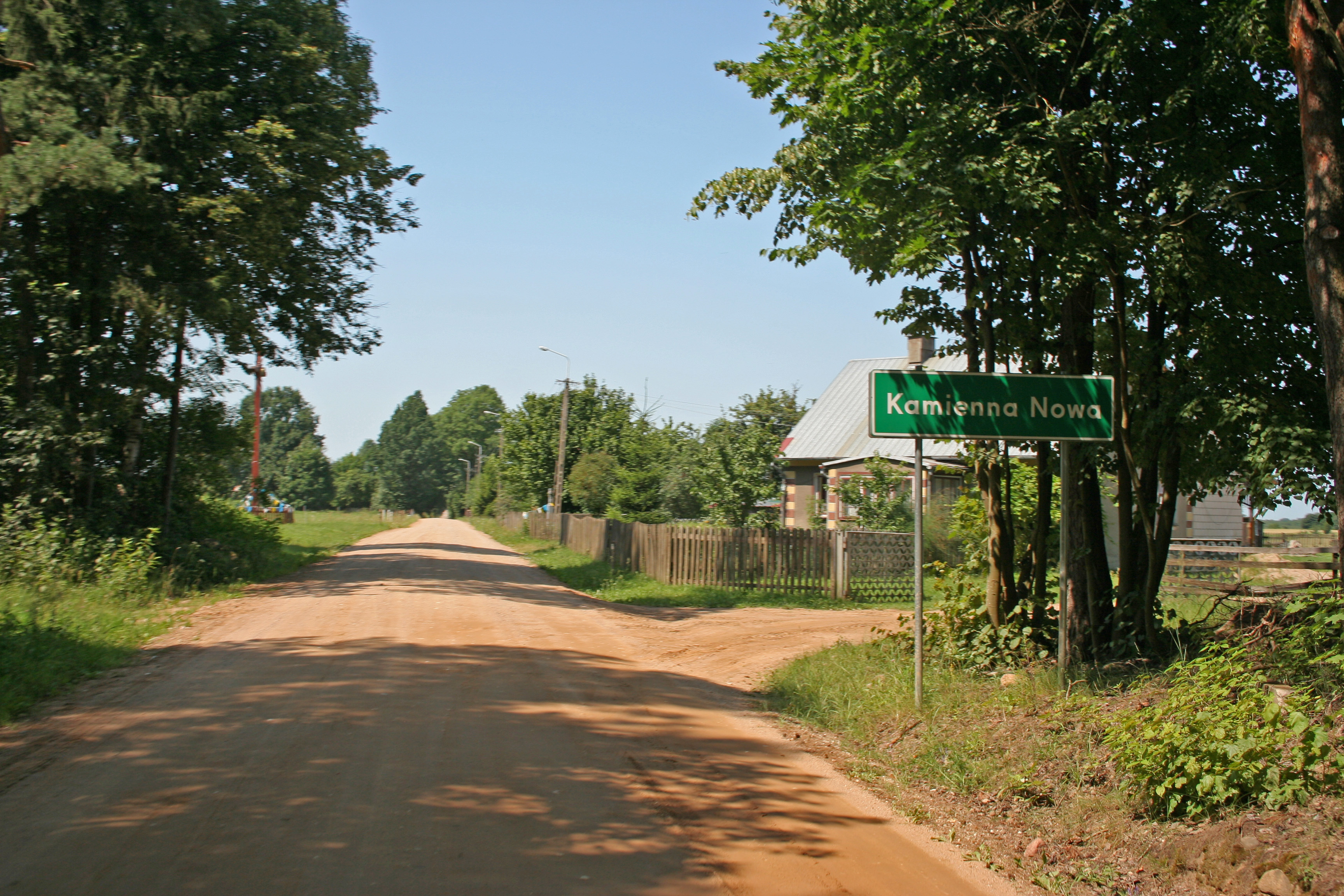

- Location within Poland
- Coordinates: 53°42′10″N 23°15′2″E
- Country: Poland
- Voivodeship: Podlaskie
- County: Sokółka
- Gmina: Dąbrowa Białostocka

Area
  - Total: 5.74 km^{2} (2.22 sq mi)

Population (2021)
  - Total: 118
  - Density: 20.56/km^{2} (53.3/sq mi)
- Time zone: UTC+1 (CET)
  - Summer (DST): UTC+2 (CEST)
- Postal code: 16-200
- Area code: +48 85
- Car plates: BSK
- SIMC: 0026643

Kamienna Nowa [kaˈmʲɛnna ˈnɔva] is a village in northeast Poland in the gmina of Dąbrowa Białostocka, Sokółka County, Podlaskie Voivodeship. As of 2021, it had a population of 118.

== Population ==
Historical population
Year	Pop.	±% p.a.
1988	177	—
2002	175	−0.08%
2011	163	−0.79%
2021	118	−3.18%
Source: GUS
