= Kirejewszczyzna =

- Village
- Location within Poland
- Coordinates: 53°39′01″N 23°18′01″E
- Country: Poland
- Voivodeship: Podlaskie
- County: Sokółka
- Gmina: Dąbrowa Białostocka

Area
  - Total: 1.37 km^{2} (0.53 sq mi)

Population (2021)
  - Total: 38
  - Density: 27.74/km^{2} (71.8/sq mi)
- Time zone: UTC+1 (CET)
  - Summer (DST): UTC+2 (CEST)
- Postal code: 16-200
- Area code: +48 85
- Car plates: BSK
- SIMC: 0026531

Kirejewszczyzna [kirɛjɛfʂˈt͡ʂɨzna] is a village in northeast Poland in the gmina of Dąbrowa Białostocka, Sokółka County, Podlaskie Voivodeship. As of 2021, it had a population of 38.

== Population ==
Historical population
Year	Pop.	±% p.a.
1988	50	—
2002	62	+1.55%
2011	57	−0.93%
2021	38	−3.97%
Source: GUS
