= Małowista =

- Village
- Location within Poland
- Coordinates: 53°41′N 23°10′E
- Country: Poland
- Voivodeship: Podlaskie
- County: Sokółka
- Gmina: Dąbrowa Białostocka

Area
  - Total: 7.94 km^{2} (3.07 sq mi)

Population (2021)
  - Total: 149
  - Density: 18.77/km^{2} (48.6/sq mi)
- Time zone: UTC+1 (CET)
  - Summer (DST): UTC+2 (CEST)
- Postal code: 16-200
- Area code: +48 85
- Car plates: BSK
- SIMC: 0026608

Małowista [mawɔˈvista] is a village in northeast Poland in the gmina of Dąbrowa Białostocka, Sokółka County, Podlaskie Voivodeship. As of 2021, it had a population of 149.

== Population ==
Historical population
Year	Pop.	±% p.a.
1988	243	—
2002	210	−1.04%
2011	197	−0.71%
2021	149	−2.75%
Source: GUS
