= Miedzianowo =

- Village
- Location within Poland
- Coordinates: 53°40′N 23°16′E
- Country: Poland
- Voivodeship: Podlaskie
- County: Sokółka
- Gmina: Dąbrowa Białostocka

Area
  - Total: 5.89 km^{2} (2.27 sq mi)

Population (2021)
  - Total: 99
  - Density: 16.81/km^{2} (43.5/sq mi)
- Time zone: UTC+1 (CET)
  - Summer (DST): UTC+2 (CEST)
- Postal code: 16-200
- Area code: +48 85
- Car plates: BSK
- SIMC: 0026614

Miedzianowo [mjɛd͡ʑaˈnɔvɔ] is a village in northeast Poland in the gmina of Dąbrowa Białostocka, Sokółka County, Podlaskie Voivodeship. As of 2021, it had a population of 99.

== Population ==
Historical population
Year	Pop.	±% p.a.
1988	169	—
2002	125	−2.13%
2011	131	+0.52%
2021	99	−2.76%
Source: GUS
