= Łozowo =

- Village
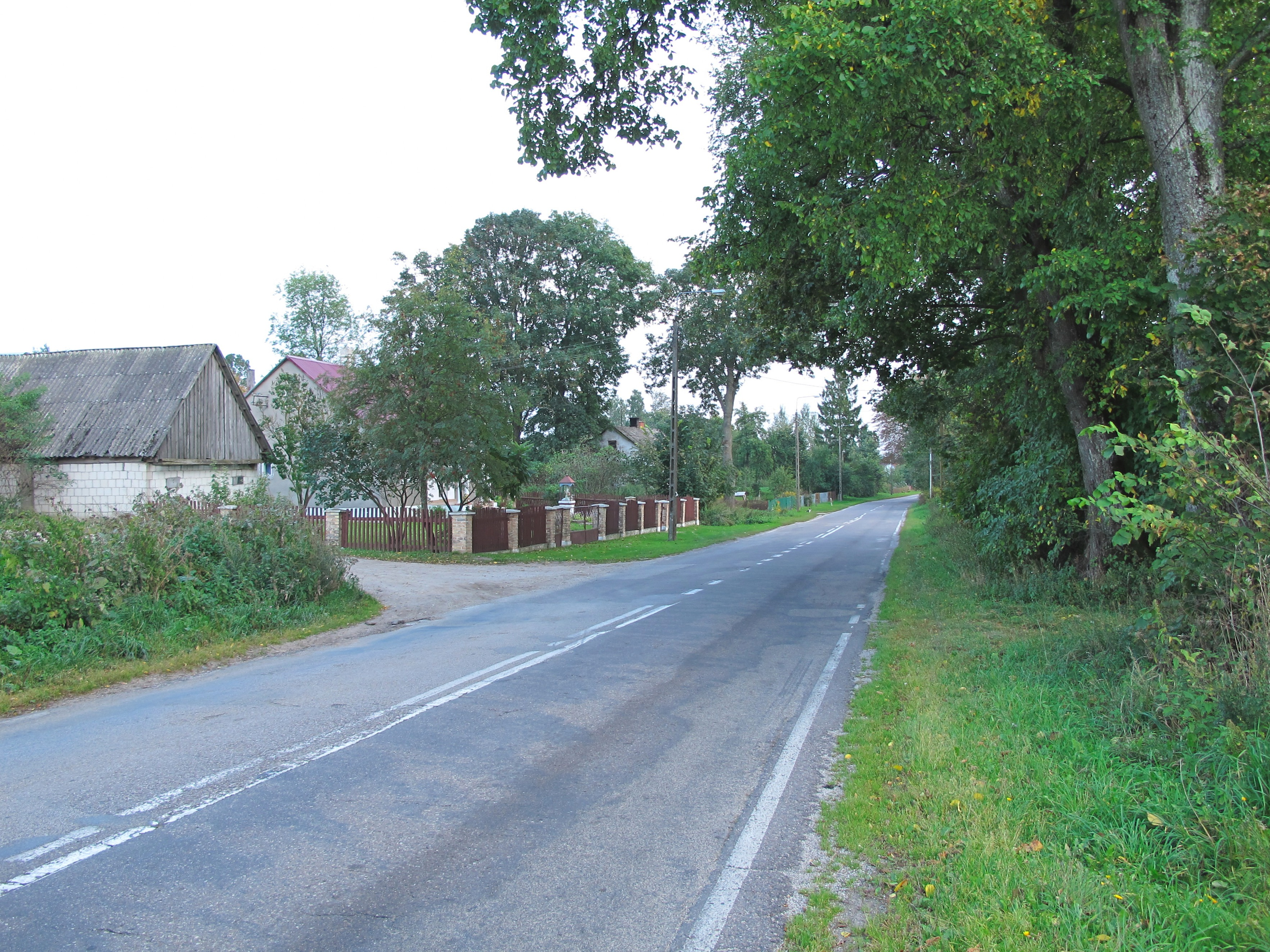

- Location within Poland
- Coordinates: 53°36′N 23°24′E
- Country: Poland
- Voivodeship: Podlaskie
- County: Sokółka
- Gmina: Dąbrowa Białostocka

Area
  - Total: 11.70 km^{2} (4.52 sq mi)

Population (2021)
  - Total: 231
  - Density: 19.74/km^{2} (51.1/sq mi)
- Time zone: UTC+1 (CET)
  - Summer (DST): UTC+2 (CEST)
- Postal code: 16-200
- Area code: +48 85
- Car plates: BSK
- SIMC: 0026590

Łozowo [wɔˈzɔvɔ] is a village in northeast Poland in the gmina of Dąbrowa Białostocka, Sokółka County, Podlaskie Voivodeship. As of 2021, it had a population of 231.

== Population ==
Historical population
| Year | Pop. | ±% p.a. |
|---|---|---|
| 1988 | 334 | — |
| 2002 | 314 | −0.44% |
| 2011 | 296 | −0.65% |
| 2021 | 231 | −2.45% |
Source: GUS
