= Grodziszczany =

- Village
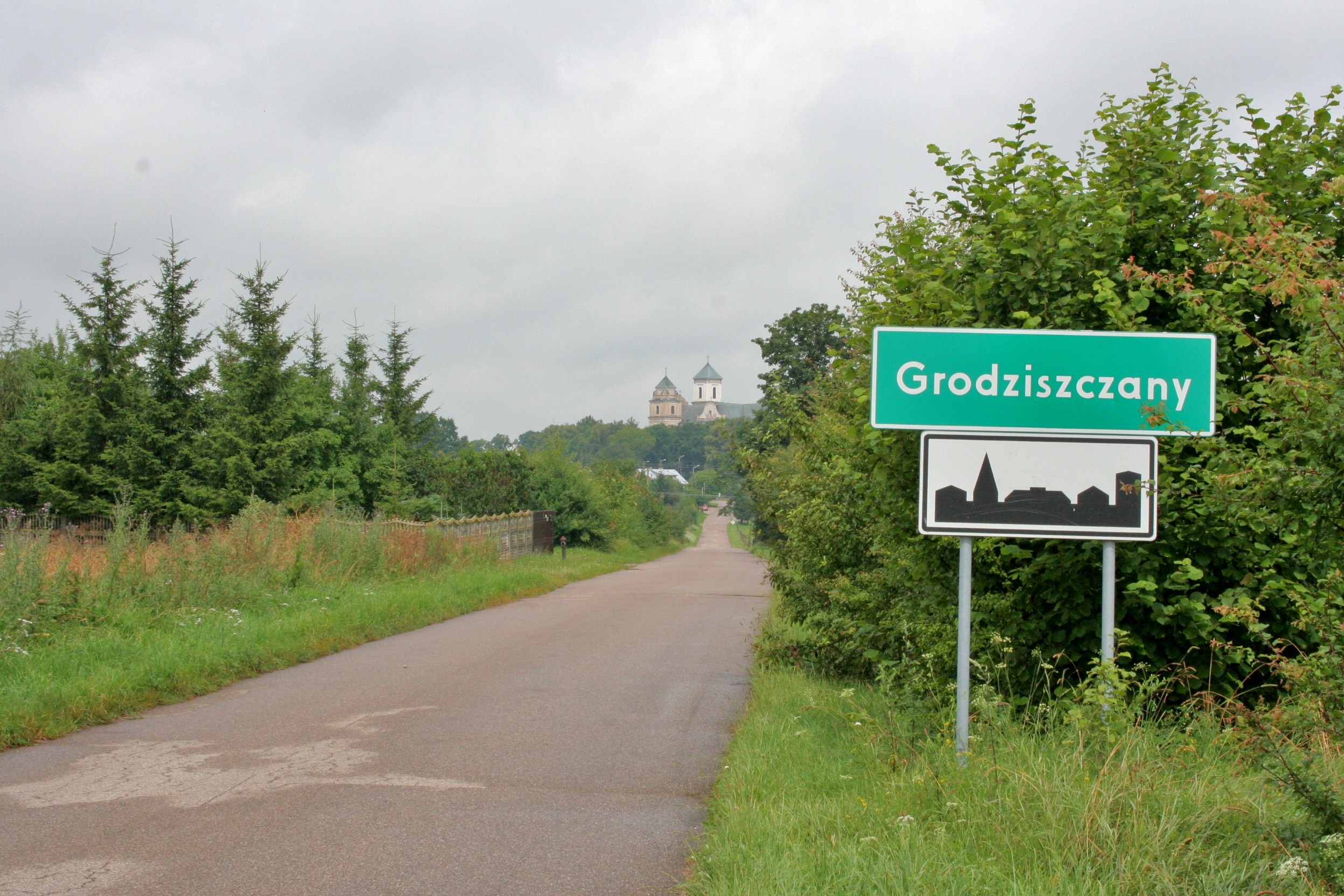

- Location within Poland
- Coordinates: 53°37′22″N 23°23′46″E
- Country: Poland
- Voivodeship: Podlaskie
- County: Sokółka
- Gmina: Dąbrowa Białostocka

Area
  - Total: 7.14 km^{2} (2.76 sq mi)

Population (2021)
  - Total: 267
  - Density: 37.39/km^{2} (96.8/sq mi)
- Time zone: UTC+1 (CET)
  - Summer (DST): UTC+2 (CEST)
- Postal code: 16-200
- Area code: +48 85
- Car plates: BSK
- SIMC: 0026471

Grodziszczany [ɡrɔd͡ʑiˈʂt͡ʂanɨ], formerly known as Grodzisk, is a village in northeast Poland in the gmina of Dąbrowa Białostocka, Sokółka County, Podlaskie Voivodeship. As of 2021, it had a population of 267.

== Population ==
Historical population
Year	Pop.	±% p.a.
1988	309	—
2002	284	−0.60%
2011	274	−0.40%
2021	267	−0.26%
Source: GUS
