= Mościcha =

- Village
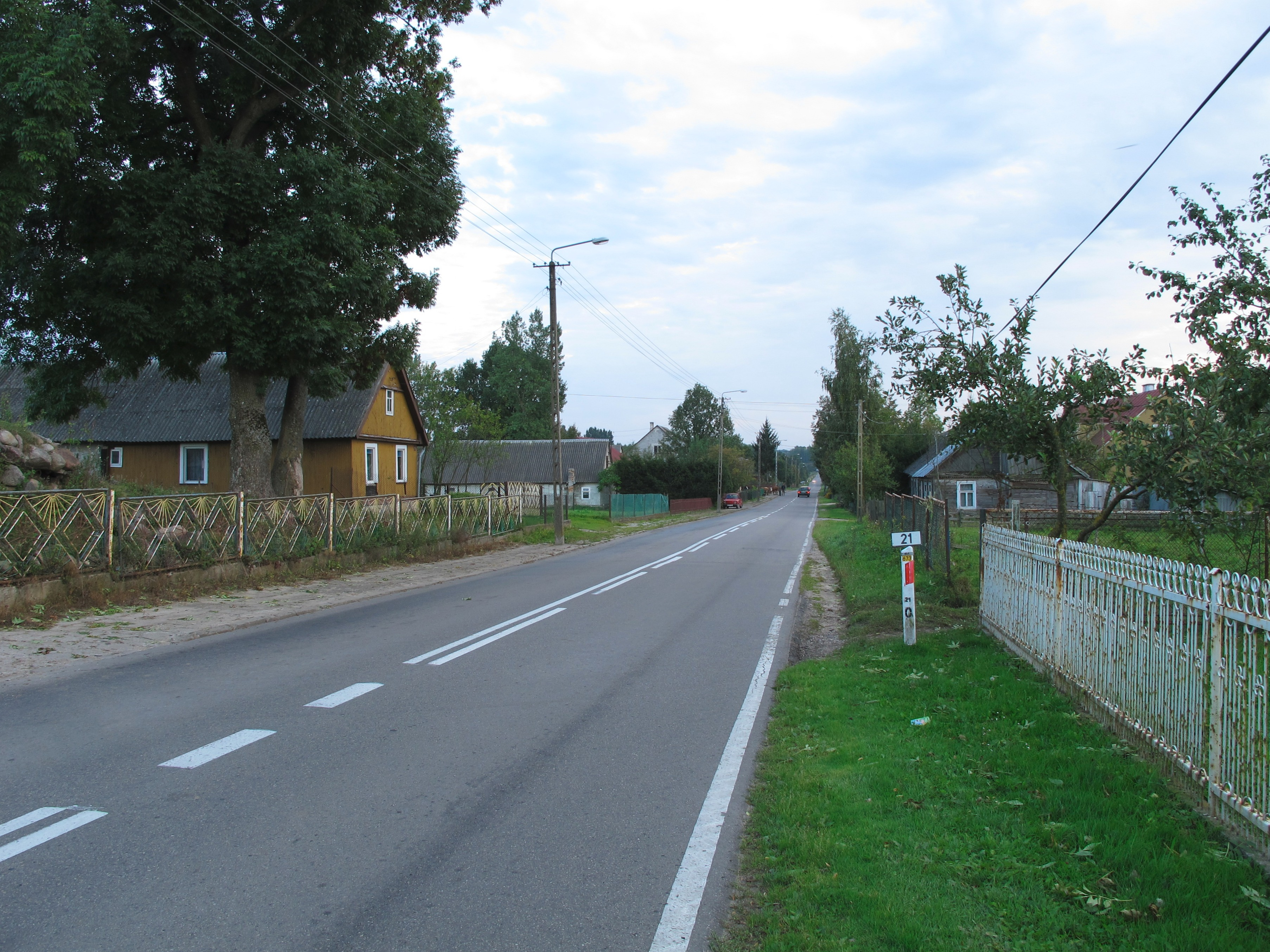

- Location within Poland
- Coordinates: 53°36′N 23°24′E
- Country: Poland
- Voivodeship: Podlaskie
- County: Sokółka
- Gmina: Dąbrowa Białostocka

Area
  - Total: 4.42 km^{2} (1.71 sq mi)

Population (2021)
  - Total: 41
  - Density: 9.28/km^{2} (24.0/sq mi)
- Time zone: UTC+1 (CET)
  - Summer (DST): UTC+2 (CEST)
- Postal code: 16-200
- Area code: +48 85
- Car plates: BSK
- SIMC: 0026620

Mościcha [mɔɕˈt͡ɕixa] is a village in northeast Poland in the administrative district of Dąbrowa Białostocka, Sokółka County, Podlaskie Voivodeship. As of 2021, it had a population of 41.

== Population ==
Historical population
Year	Pop.	±% p.a.
1988	91	—
2002	72	−1.66%
2011	56	−2.75%
2021	41	−3.07%
Source: GUS
