= Brzozowo =

Brzozowo may refer to the following places:

- Brzozowo, Kuyavian-Pomeranian Voivodeship (north-central Poland)
- Brzozowo, Kolno County in Podlaskie Voivodeship (north-east Poland)
- Brzozowo, Sokółka County in Podlaskie Voivodeship (north-east Poland)
- Brzozowo, Pomeranian Voivodeship (north Poland)
- Brzozowo, Warmian-Masurian Voivodeship (north Poland)
- Brzozowo, Gmina Nowogard in West Pomeranian Voivodeship (north-west Poland)
- Brzozowo, Gmina Przybiernów in West Pomeranian Voivodeship (north-west Poland)
