= Krugło =

- Village
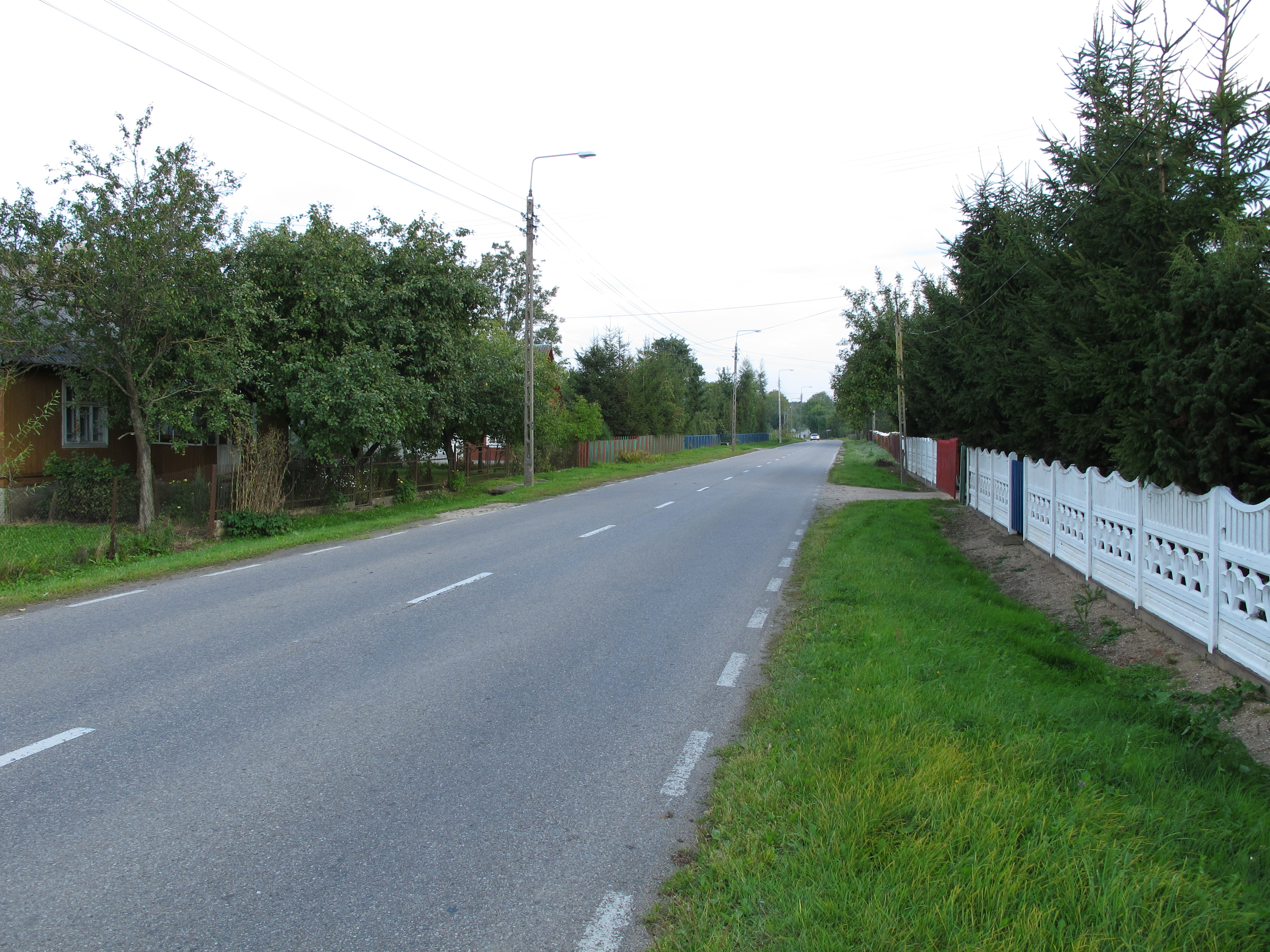
- VR673 road in Krugło village, gmina Dąbrowa Białostocka, podlaskie, Poland

- Location within Poland
- Coordinates: 53°37′42″N 23°21′42″E
- Country: Poland
- Voivodeship: Podlaskie
- County: Sokółka
- Gmina: Dąbrowa Białostocka

Area
  - Total: 7.02 km^{2} (2.71 sq mi)

Population (2021)
  - Total: 137
  - Density: 19.52/km^{2} (50.6/sq mi)
- Time zone: UTC+1 (CET)
  - Summer (DST): UTC+2 (CEST)
- Postal code: 16-200
- Area code: +48 85
- Car plates: BSK
- SIMC: 0026554

Krugło [ˈkruɡwɔ] is a village in northeast Poland in the gmina of Dąbrowa Białostocka, Sokółka County, Podlaskie Voivodeship. As of 2021, it had a population of 137.

== Population ==
Historical population
Year	Pop.	±% p.a.
1988	205	—
2002	197	−0.28%
2011	187	−0.58%
2021	137	−3.06%
Source: GUS
