= Bagny =

- Village
- Location within Poland
- Coordinates: 53°37′34″N 23°13′27″E
- Country: Poland
- Voivodeship: Podlaskie
- County: Sokółka
- Gmina: Dąbrowa Białostocka

Area (Note: Population and area statistics are of the census area. It may include areas outside the village itself.)
  - Total: 5.64 km^{2} (2.18 sq mi)

Population (2021)
  - Total: 180
  - Density: 32/km^{2} (83/sq mi)
- Time zone: UTC+1 (CET)
  - Summer (DST): UTC+2 (CEST)
- Postal code: 16-200
- Area code: +48 85
- Car plates: BSK
- SIMC: 0026420

Bagny [ˈbaɡnɨ] is a village in northeast Poland in the gmina of Dąbrowa Białostocka, Sokółka County, Podlaskie Voivodeship. As of 2021, it had a population of 180.

== Population ==
Historical population
Year	Pop.	±% p.a.
1988	225	—
2002	210	−0.49%
2011	212	+0.11%
2021	180	−1.62%
Source: GUS
