= Nowinka, Gmina Dąbrowa Białostocka =

Nowinka
- Village
- Location within Poland
- Coordinates: 53°40′25″N 23°17′04″E
- Country: Poland
- Voivodeship: Podlaskie
- County: Sokółka
- Gmina: Dąbrowa Białostocka

Area
  - Total: 1.46 km^{2} (0.56 sq mi)

Population (2021)
  - Total: 41
  - Density: 28.08/km^{2} (72.7/sq mi)
- Time zone: UTC+1 (CET)
  - Summer (DST): UTC+2 (CEST)
- Postal code: 16-200
- Area code: +48 85
- Car plates: BSK
- SIMC: 0026672

Nowinka [nɔˈviŋka] is a village in northeast Poland in the gmina of Dąbrowa Białostocka, Sokółka County, Podlaskie Voivodeship. As of 2021, it had a population of 41.

== Population ==
Historical population
Year	Pop.	±% p.a.
1988	46	—
2002	38	−1.36%
2011	40	+0.57%
2021	41	+0.25%
Source: GUS
