= Dombrowa =

Dombrowa is the German name of:

- Dąbrowa Górnicza, a city in Zagłębie Dąbrowskie, southern Poland, near Katowice and Sosnowiec
- Dąbrowa Białostocka, a town in Sokółka County, Podlaskie Voivodeship, in northeast Poland
