= Ostrowie-Kolonia =

- Settlement
- Location within Poland
- Coordinates: 53°41′01″N 23°24′01″E
- Country: Poland
- Voivodeship: Podlaskie
- County: Sokółka
- Gmina: Dąbrowa Białostocka

Ostrowie-Kolonia [ɔsˈtrɔvjɛ kɔˈlɔɲa] is a settlement in the administrative district of Gmina Dąbrowa Białostocka, within Sokółka County, Podlaskie Voivodeship, in north-eastern Poland.
