= Stara Kamienna-Kolonia =

- Settlement
- Location within Poland
- Coordinates: 53°41′01″N 23°19′01″E
- Country: Poland
- Voivodeship: Podlaskie
- County: Sokółka
- Gmina: Dąbrowa Białostocka

Stara Kamienna-Kolonia [ˈstara kaˈmjɛnna kɔˈlɔɲa] is a settlement in the administrative district of Gmina Dąbrowa Białostocka, within Sokółka County, Podlaskie Voivodeship, in north-eastern Poland.
