= Małyszówka-Kolonia =

Village in Gmina Dąbrowa Białostocka, Poland

- Village
- Location within Poland
- Coordinates: 53°39′01″N 23°21′01″E
- Country: Poland
- Voivodeship: Podlaskie
- County: Sokółka
- Gmina: Dąbrowa Białostocka

Małyszówka-Kolonia [mawɨˈʂufka kɔˈlɔɲa] is a village in the administrative district of Gmina Dąbrowa Białostocka, within Sokółka County, Podlaskie Voivodeship, in north-eastern Poland.
