= Nowinka =

Nowinka may refer to the following places:

- Nowinka, Augustów County in Podlaskie Voivodeship (north-east Poland)
- Nowinka, Gmina Sokółka in Podlaskie Voivodeship (north-east Poland)
- Nowinka, Gmina Dąbrowa Białostocka in Podlaskie Voivodeship (north-east Poland)
- Nowinka, Gmina Korycin in Podlaskie Voivodeship (north-east Poland)
- Nowinka, Gmina Sidra in Podlaskie Voivodeship (north-east Poland)
- Nowinka, Gmina Szudziałowo in Podlaskie Voivodeship (north-east Poland)
- Nowinka, Warmian-Masurian Voivodeship (north Poland)
