= Brzozowo, Sokółka County =

Brzozowo
- Village
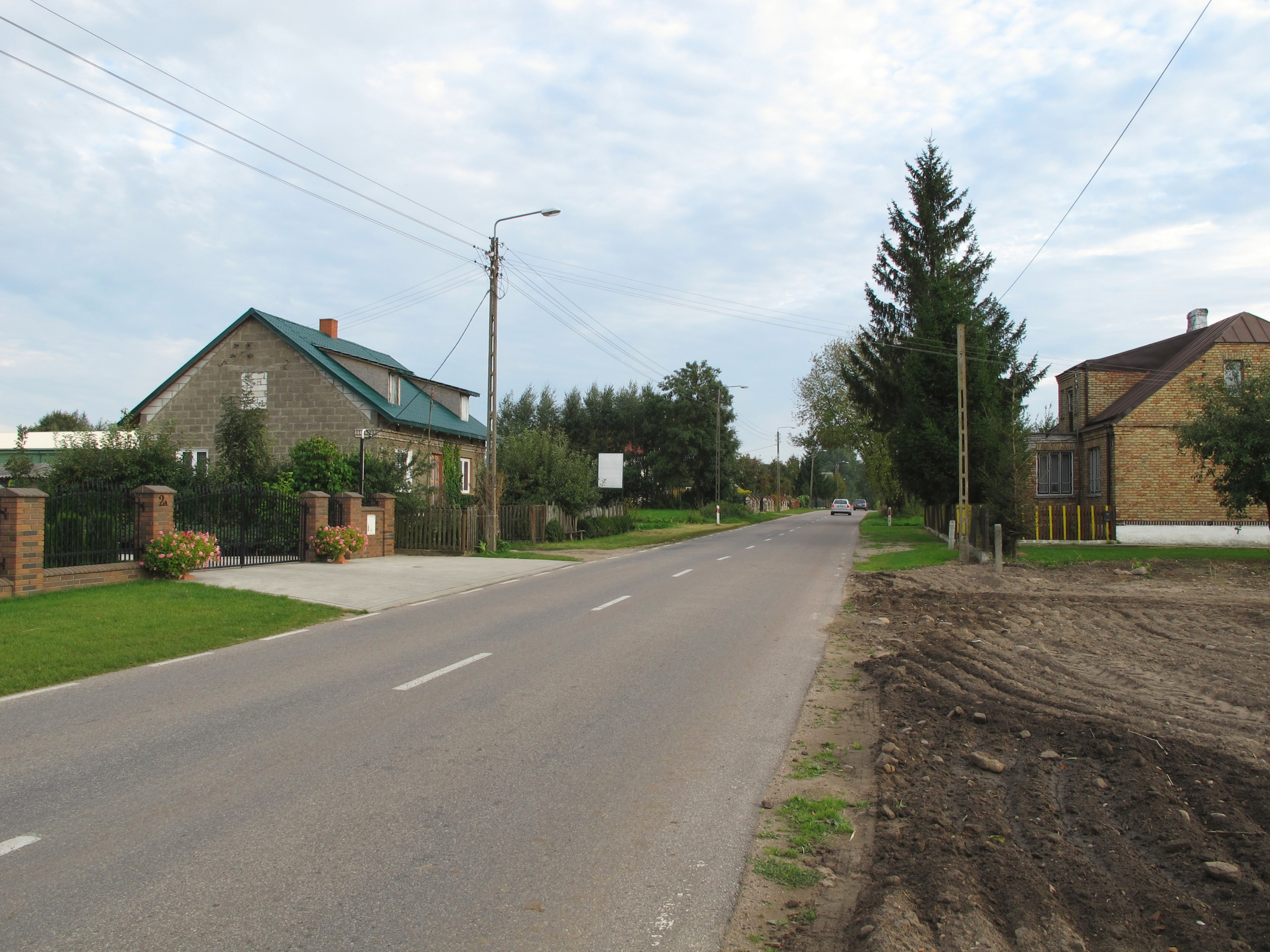

- Location within Poland
- Coordinates: 53°37′43″N 23°21′35″E
- Country: Poland
- Voivodeship: Podlaskie
- County: Sokółka
- Gmina: Dąbrowa Białostocka

Area
  - Total: 7.06 km^{2} (2.73 sq mi)

Population (2021)
  - Total: 226
  - Density: 32.01/km^{2} (82.9/sq mi)
- Time zone: UTC+1 (CET)
  - Summer (DST): UTC+2 (CEST)
- Postal code: 16-200
- Area code: +48 85
- Car plates: BSK
- SIMC: 0026442

Brzozowo [bʐɔˈzɔvɔ] is a village in northeast Poland in the gmina of Dąbrowa Białostocka, Sokółka County, Podlaskie Voivodeship. As of 2021, it had a population of 226.

== Population ==
Historical population
| Year | Pop. | ±% p.a. |
|---|---|---|
| 1988 | 275 | — |
| 2002 | 245 | −0.82% |
| 2011 | 243 | −0.09% |
| 2021 | 226 | −0.72% |
Source: GUS
