= Wesołowo =

Wesołowo may refer to the following places:

- Wesołowo, Sokółka County in Podlaskie Voivodeship (north-east Poland)
- Wesołowo, Suwałki County in Podlaskie Voivodeship (north-east Poland)
- Wesołowo, Szczytno County in Warmian-Masurian Voivodeship (north Poland)
- Wesołowo, Węgorzewo County in Warmian-Masurian Voivodeship (north Poland)
