= Sadowo, Podlaskie Voivodeship =

Sadowo
- Village
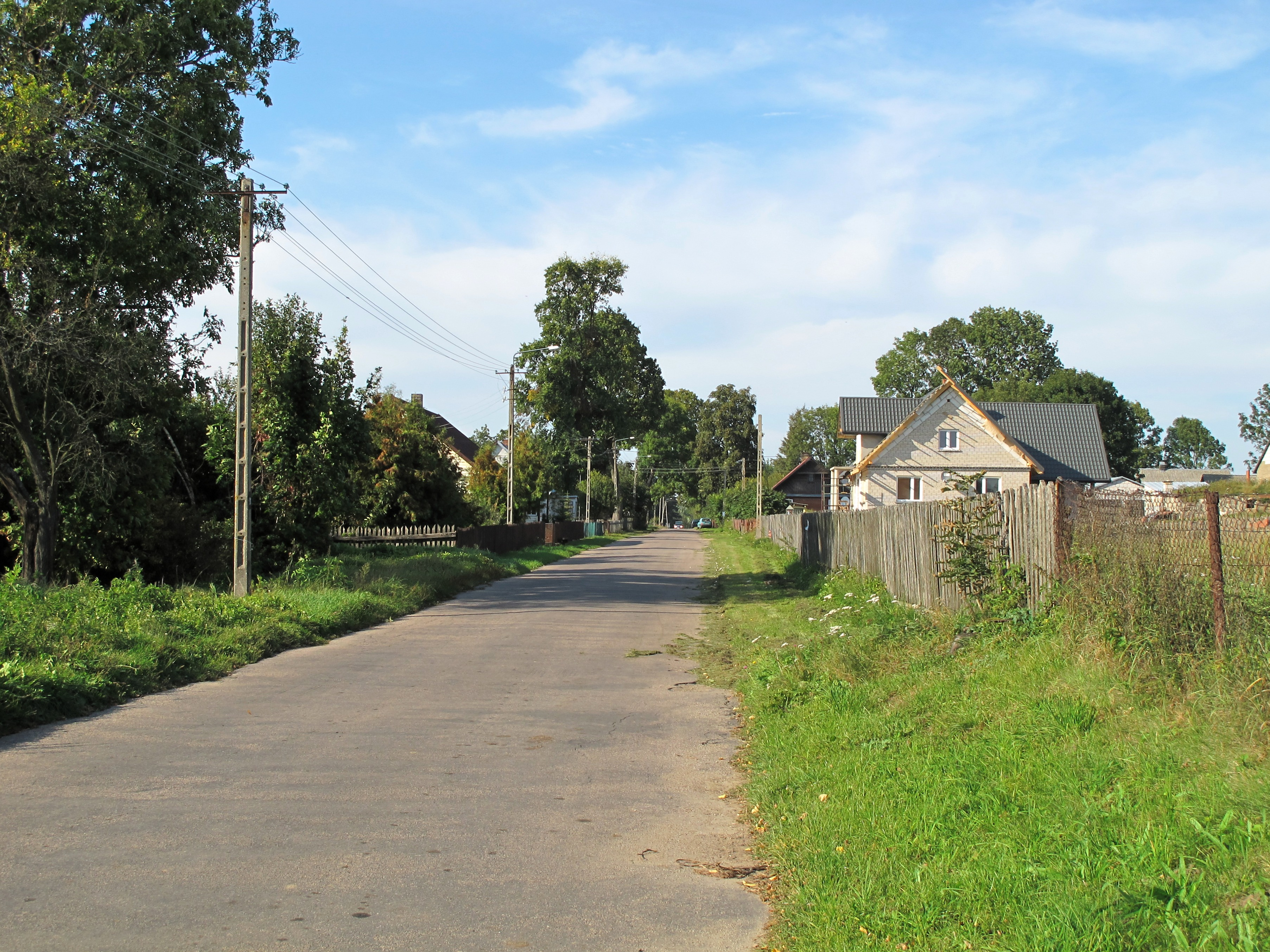

- Location within Poland
- Coordinates: 53°36′N 23°19′E
- Country: Poland
- Voivodeship: Podlaskie
- County: Sokółka
- Gmina: Dąbrowa Białostocka

Sadowo [saˈdɔvɔ] is a village in the administrative district of Gmina Dąbrowa Białostocka, within Sokółka County, Podlaskie Voivodeship, in north-eastern Poland.
