= Olsza, Podlaskie Voivodeship =

Olsza
- Village
- Location within Poland
- Coordinates: 53°40′N 23°14′E
- Country: Poland
- Voivodeship: Podlaskie
- County: Sokółka
- Gmina: Dąbrowa Białostocka

Olsza [ˈɔlʂa] is a village in the administrative district of Gmina Dąbrowa Białostocka, within Sokółka County, Podlaskie Voivodeship, in north-eastern Poland.
