= Zwierzyniec Wielki =

- Village
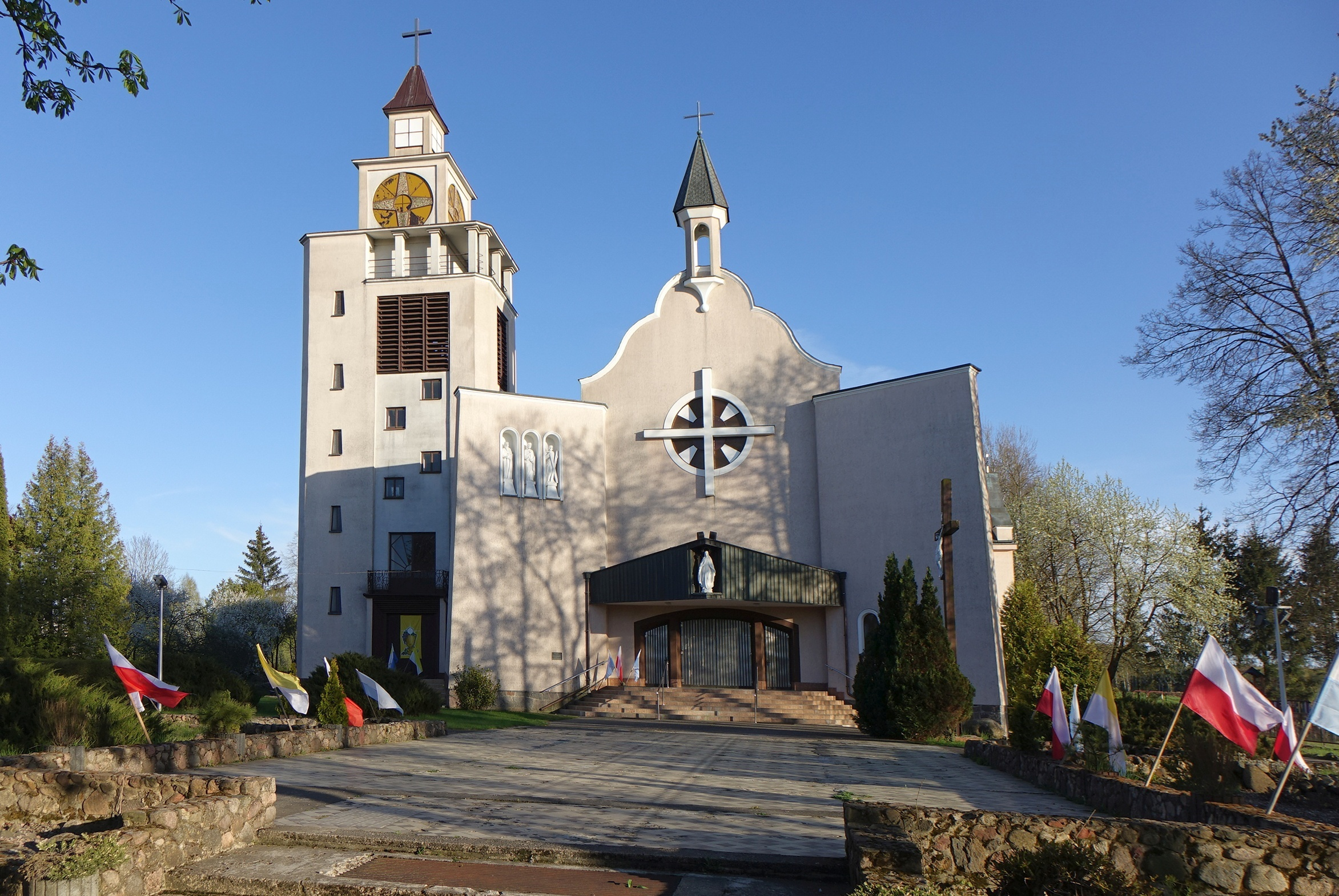
- Church of Our Virgin Mary, Queen of Poland

- Location within Poland
- Coordinates: 53°40′N 23°12′E
- Country: Poland
- Voivodeship: Podlaskie
- County: Sokółka
- Gmina: Dąbrowa Białostocka

Zwierzyniec Wielki (Polish pronunciation: [zvjɛˈʐɨɲɛts ˈfjɛlkʲi]) is a village in the administrative district of Gmina Dąbrowa Białostocka, within Sokółka County, Podlaskie Voivodeship, in north-eastern Poland.
