= Trzyrzeczki =

- Village
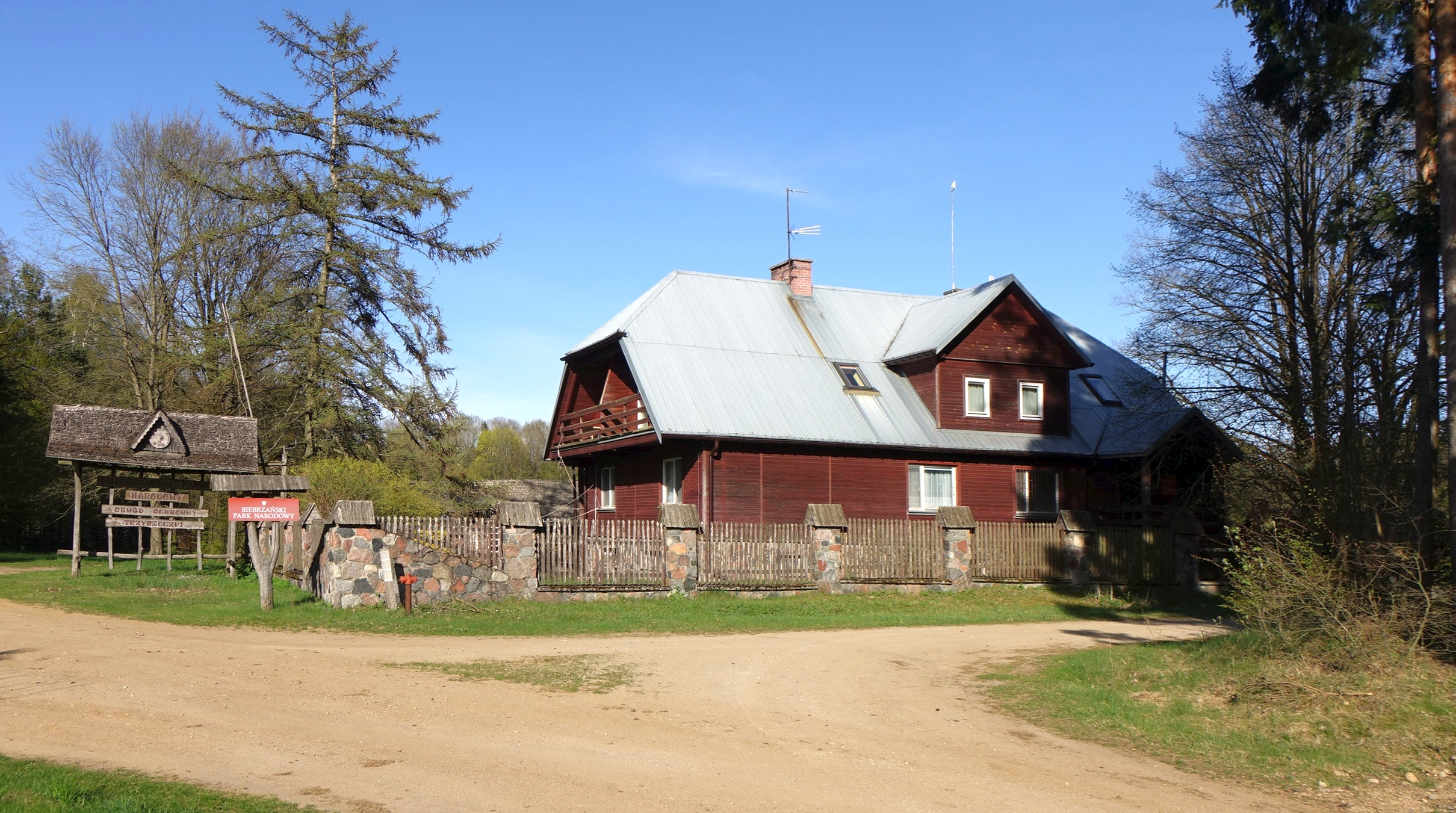

- Location within Poland
- Coordinates: 53°42′N 23°12′E
- Country: Poland
- Voivodeship: Podlaskie
- County: Sokółka
- Gmina: Dąbrowa Białostocka

Trzyrzeczki [tʂɨˈʐɛt͡ʂki] is a village in the administrative district of Gmina Dąbrowa Białostocka, within Sokółka County, Podlaskie Voivodeship, in north-eastern Poland.
