= Zwierzyniec Mały =

- Village
- Location within Poland
- Coordinates: 53°40′N 23°13′E
- Country: Poland
- Voivodeship: Podlaskie
- County: Sokółka
- Gmina: Dąbrowa Białostocka

Zwierzyniec Mały (Polish pronunciation: [zvjɛˈʐɨɲɛt͡s ˈmawɨ]) is a village in the administrative district of Gmina Dąbrowa Białostocka, within Sokółka County, Podlaskie Voivodeship, in north-eastern Poland.
