= Sadek, Podlaskie Voivodeship =

Sadek
- Village
- Location within Poland
- Coordinates: 53°38′11″N 23°14′11″E
- Country: Poland
- Voivodeship: Podlaskie
- County: Sokółka
- Gmina: Dąbrowa Białostocka

Sadek [ˈsadɛk] is a village in the administrative district of Gmina Dąbrowa Białostocka, within Sokółka County, Podlaskie Voivodeship, in north-eastern Poland.
