= Osmołowszczyzna =

- Village
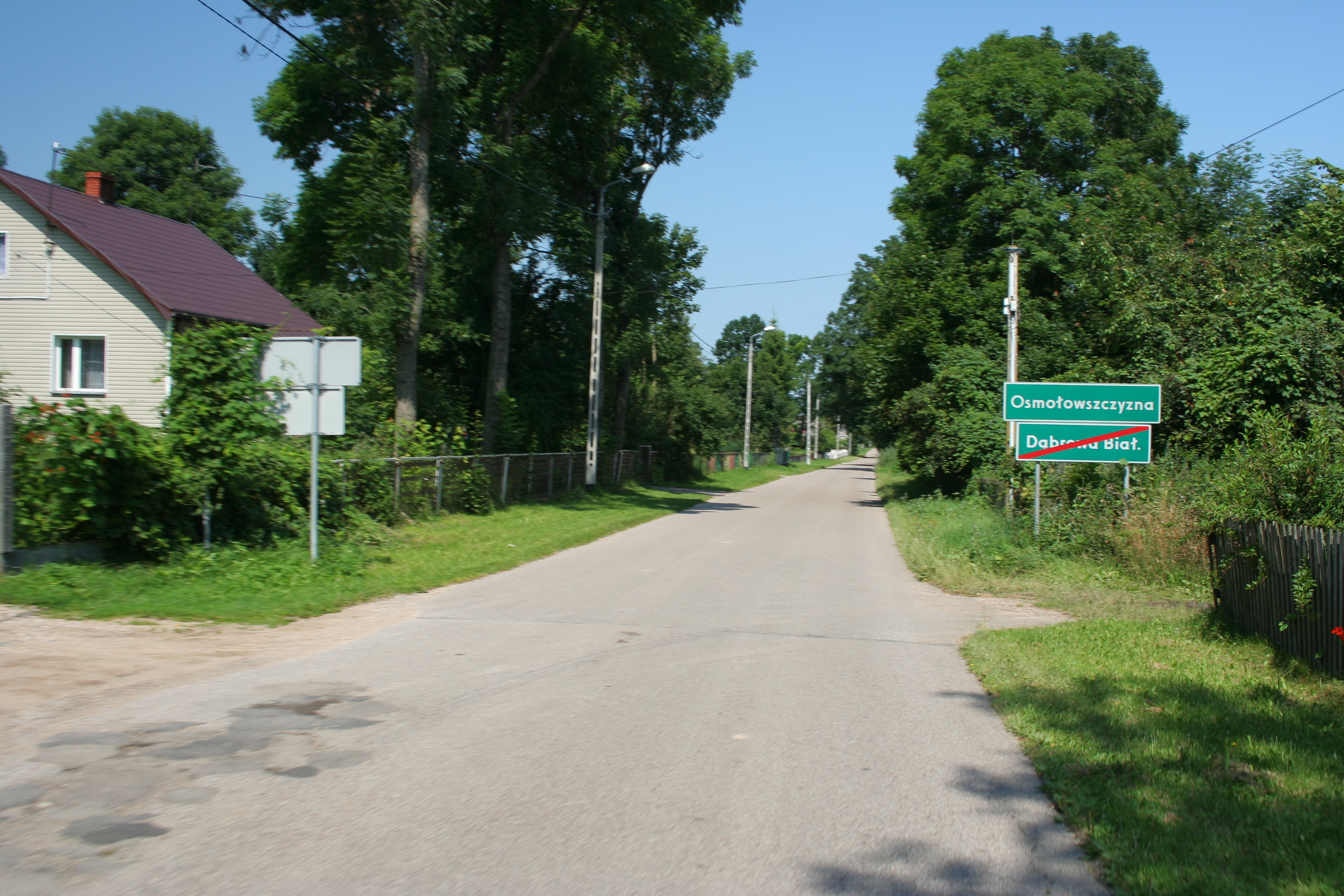
- Road sign in Osmołowszczyzna

- Location within Poland
- Coordinates: 53°39′46″N 23°15′51″E
- Country: Poland
- Voivodeship: Podlaskie
- County: Sokółka
- Gmina: Dąbrowa Białostocka

Osmołowszczyzna [ɔsmɔwɔfʂˈt͡ʂɨzna] is a village in the administrative district of Gmina Dąbrowa Białostocka, within Sokółka County, Podlaskie Voivodeship, in north-eastern Poland.
