= Stock, Podlaskie Voivodeship =

Stock
- Village
- Location within Poland
- Coordinates: 53°39′29″N 23°23′51″E
- Country: Poland
- Voivodeship: Podlaskie
- County: Sokółka
- Gmina: Dąbrowa Białostocka

Stock [stɔt͡sk] is a village in the administrative district of Gmina Dąbrowa Białostocka, within Sokółka County, Podlaskie Voivodeship, in north-eastern Poland.
