= Pięciowłóki =

Village in Gmina Dąbrowa Białostocka, Poland

- Village
- Location within Poland
- Coordinates: 53°38′08″N 23°14′08″E
- Country: Poland
- Voivodeship: Podlaskie
- County: Sokółka
- Gmina: Dąbrowa Białostocka

Pięciowłóki [pjɛnt͡ɕɔˈvwuki] is a village in the administrative district of Gmina Dąbrowa Białostocka, within Sokółka County, Podlaskie Voivodeship, in north-eastern Poland.
