= Wroczyńszczyzna, Gmina Dąbrowa Białostocka =

Wroczyńszczyzna
- Village
- Location within Poland
- Coordinates: 53°37′N 23°15′E
- Country: Poland
- Voivodeship: Podlaskie
- County: Sokółka
- Gmina: Dąbrowa Białostocka

Wroczyńszczyzna [vrɔt͡ʂɨɲʂˈt͡ʂɨzna] is a village in the administrative district of Gmina Dąbrowa Białostocka, within Sokółka County, Podlaskie Voivodeship, in north-eastern Poland.
