= Sławno, Podlaskie Voivodeship =

Sławno
- Village
- Location within Poland
- Coordinates: 53°36′01″N 23°19′01″E
- Country: Poland
- Voivodeship: Podlaskie
- County: Sokółka
- Gmina: Dąbrowa Białostocka

Sławno [ˈswavnɔ] is a village in the administrative district of Gmina Dąbrowa Białostocka, within Sokółka County, Podlaskie Voivodeship, in north-eastern Poland.
