= Szuszalewo =

- Village
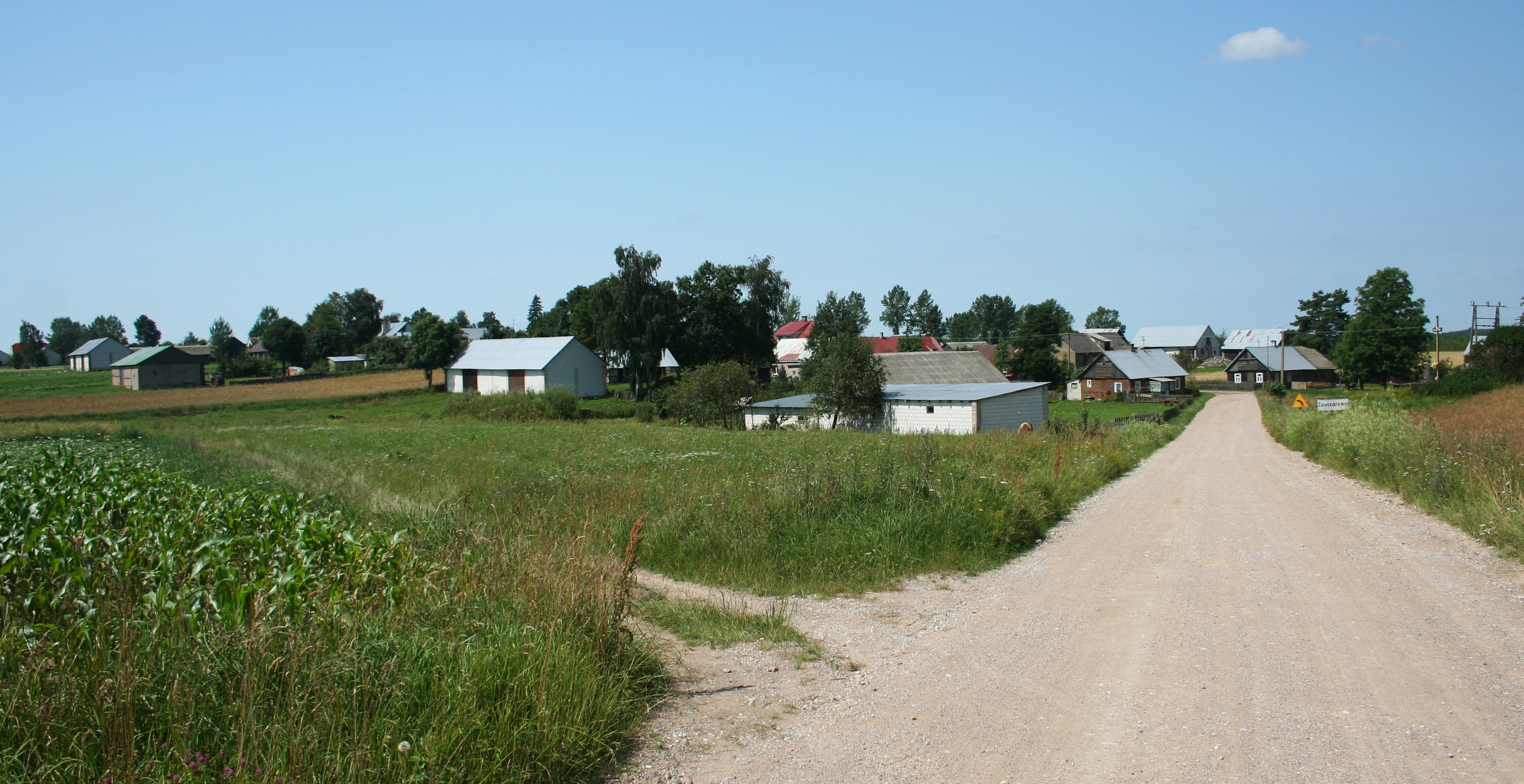

- Location within Poland
- Coordinates: 53°43′N 23°21′E
- Country: Poland
- Voivodeship: Podlaskie
- County: Sokółka
- Gmina: Dąbrowa Białostocka
- Postal code: 16-200
- Vehicle registration: BSK

Szuszalewo [ʂuʂaˈlɛvɔ] is a village in the administrative district of Gmina Dąbrowa Białostocka, within Sokółka County, Podlaskie Voivodeship, in north-eastern Poland.

Four Polish citizens were murdered by Nazi Germany in the village during World War II.
