= Wesołowo, Sokółka County =

Wesołowo
- Village
- Location within Poland
- Coordinates: 53°39′N 23°18′E
- Country: Poland
- Voivodeship: Podlaskie
- County: Sokółka
- Gmina: Dąbrowa Białostocka

Wesołowo [vɛsɔˈwɔvɔ] is a village in the administrative district of Gmina Dąbrowa Białostocka, within Sokółka County, Podlaskie Voivodeship, in north-eastern Poland.
