= Brzozowo, Pomeranian Voivodeship =

Brzozowo
- Village
- Location within Poland
- Coordinates: 53°59′38″N 17°11′43″E
- Country: Poland
- Voivodeship: Pomeranian
- County: Bytów
- Gmina: Lipnica
- Population: 125

Brzozowo (Kashubian: Brzòzòwò) is a village in Gmina Lipnica, Bytów County, Pomeranian Voivodeship, in northern Poland.

From 1975 to 1998 the village was in Słupsk Voivodeship.

== Population ==
| Year | Residents |
|---|---|
| 2011 | 147 |
| 2021 | 133 |
