= Dąbrowa Białostocka =

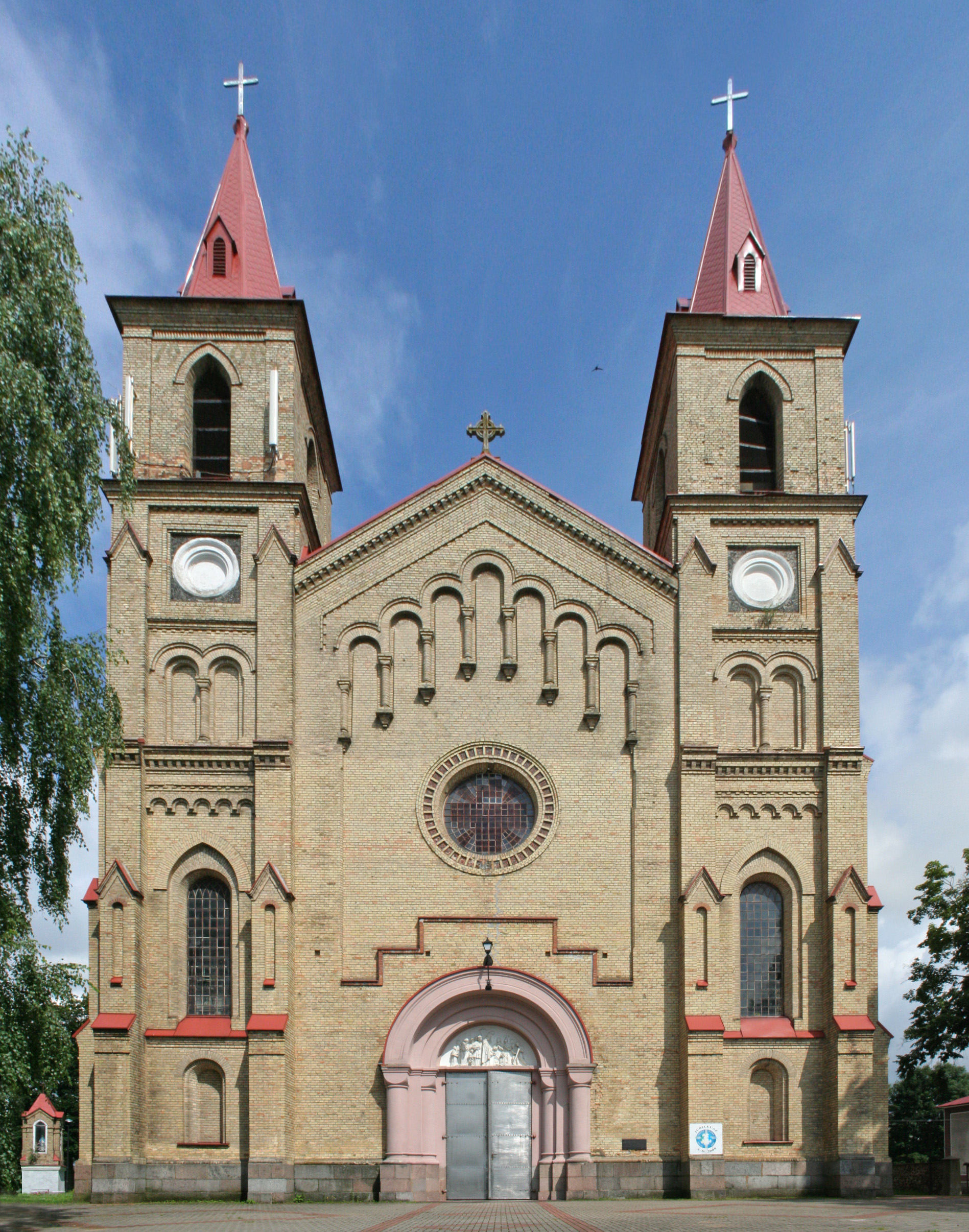
- Church of Saint Stanislaus

- Coat of arms

- Location within Poland
- Coordinates: 53°39′N 23°21′E
- Country: Poland
- Voivodeship: Podlaskie
- County: Sokółka
- Gmina: Dąbrowa Białostocka

Government
  - Mayor: Artur Gajlewicz

Area
  - Total: 22.64 km^{2} (8.74 sq mi)

Population (31 December 2021)
  - Total: 5,305
  - Density: 234.3/km^{2} (606.9/sq mi)
- Postal code: 16-200
- Area code: +48 85
- Car plates: BSK
- Website: http://www.dabrowa-bial.pl

Dąbrowa Białostocka [dɔmˈbrɔva bʲawɔˈstɔt͡ska] is a town in Sokółka County, Podlaskie Voivodeship, in north-eastern Poland. As of December 2021, the town has a population of 5,305.

== History ==
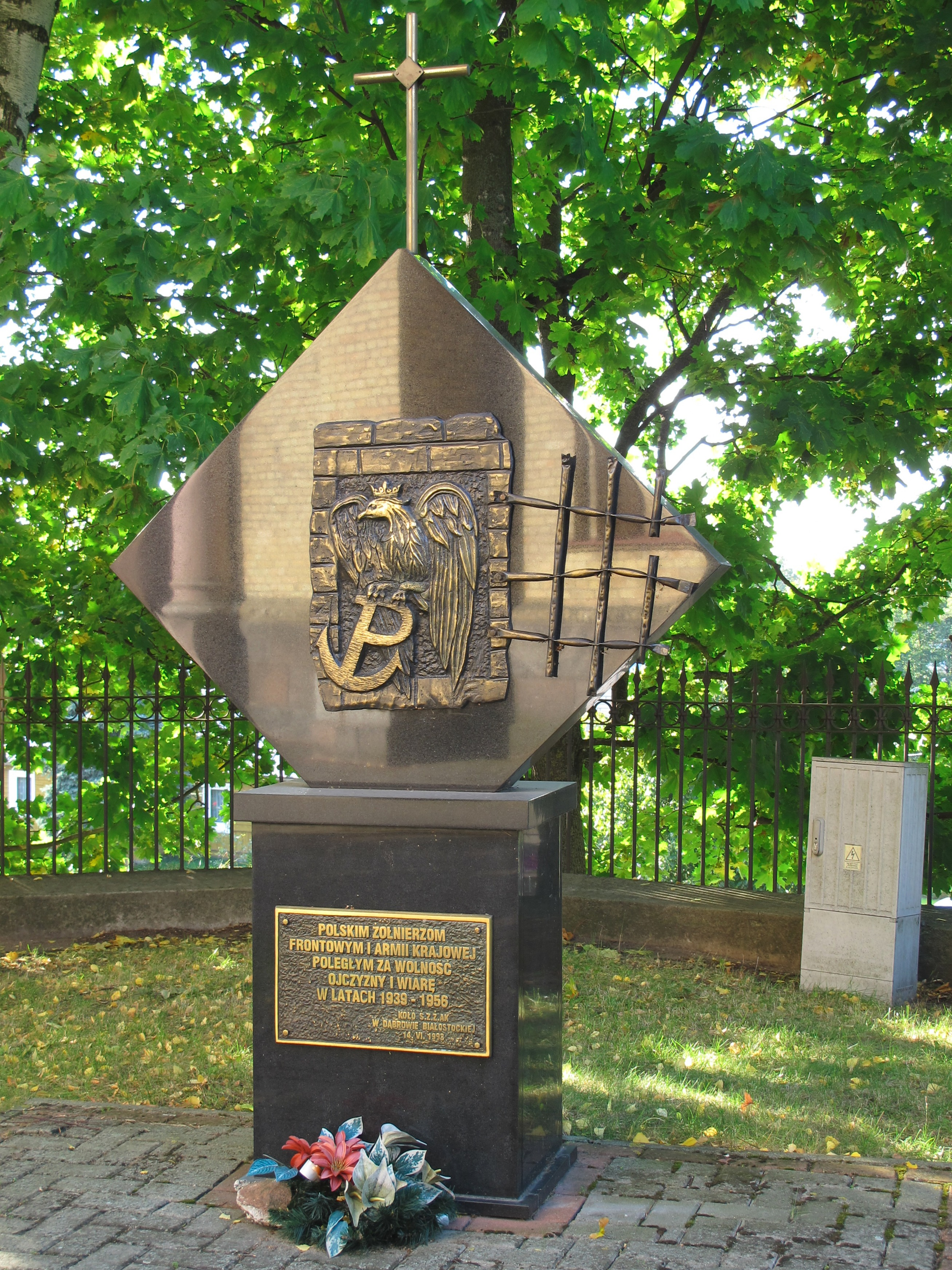
Home Army memorial

=== Jewish history ===
The Jewish community of Dąbrowa Białostocka, also known as Dąbrowa Grodzieńska, flourished between the 18th and early 20th centuries. By 1921, approximately over 1,200 Jews resided in the town, accounting for about 40% of its population. The community maintained religious, cultural, and educational institutions, including a *Tarbut* school and various Zionist political organizations. Jewish residents were integral to the town's economic and social fabric, with many involved in trade and artisanal crafts.

==== The Holocaust ====
In September 1939, the German army occupied Dąbrowa Białostocka, but control soon passed to the Soviet Union under the Molotov-Ribbentrop Pact. The situation drastically changed in June 1941, with the launch of Operation Barbarossa. The Germans re-occupied the town, burning many buildings, including homes and community infrastructure.

Most of the Jewish population attempted to escape to nearby towns such as Nowy Dwór and Suchowola, sharing the fate of those communities. Approximately 600 Jews who remained in Dąbrowa Białostocka were confined in a temporary ghetto housed in the town's bathhouse and cinema. These individuals were subjected to forced labor, and a group of young men was murdered during this period.

In May 1942, older Jewish residents were deported to the ghetto in Suchowola. On November 2, 1942, the remaining Jews were sent to the Kiełbasin transit camp. From there, on December 14, 1942, they were transported to the Treblinka extermination camp, where they were murdered.

==== Post-Holocaust and commemoration ====
The Jewish community of Dąbrowa Białostocka was completely annihilated during the Holocaust. Post-war, no significant Jewish population returned to the town. However, the legacy of the Jewish community is honored through various commemorative projects. One notable initiative is *Kaddish for Dąbrowa Białostocka*, a series of artworks by Mark Podwal that memorializes the town's Jewish history and pays tribute to its victims. Additionally, local efforts include memorial plaques and a mural project to preserve the memory of the once-thriving Jewish community.

== Demographics ==
Historical population
Year	Pop.	±%
1921	3,014	—
1931	3,494	+15.9%
1939	4,096	+17.2%
2010	5,928	+44.7%

According to the 1921 census, the population was 58.1% Polish, 40.0% Jewish, 1.1% Tatar, 0.7% Belarusian.

== Notable people ==
- Peter Sidorkiewicz (born 1963), former National Hockey League player
