= Gmina Dąbrowa Białostocka =

Gmina Dąbrowa Białostocka Dąbrowa Białostocka Commune
- Gmina
- Coat of arms

- Gmina Dąbrowa Białostocka within the Sokółka County
- Coordinates (Dąbrowa Białostocka): 53°39′N 23°21′E
- Country: Poland
- Voivodeship: Podlaskie
- County: Sokółka
- Seat: Dąbrowa Białostocka

Government
  - Mayor: Artur Gajlewicz

Area
  - Total: 263.95 km^{2} (101.91 sq mi)

Population (2022)
  - Total: 10,226
  - Density: 38.742/km^{2} (100.34/sq mi)
  - Urban: 5,082
  - Rural: 5,144
- Time zone: UTC+1 (CET)
  - Summer (DST): UTC+2 (CEST)
- Postal code: 16-200
- Area code: +48 85
- Car plates: BSK
- TERC: 0026420
- Website: http://www.dabrowa-bial.pl

Gmina Dąbrowa Białostocka is an urban-rural gmina (administrative district) in Sokółka County, Podlaskie Voivodeship, in north-eastern Poland. Its seat is the town of Dąbrowa Białostocka, which lies approximately 30 kilometres (19 mi) north of Sokółka and 61 km (38 mi) north of the regional capital Białystok.

The gmina covers an area of 263.95 square kilometres (101.9 sq mi), and as of 2006 its total population is 12,755 (out of which the population of Dąbrowa Białostocka amounts to 6,147, and the population of the rural part of the gmina is 6,608).

== Government ==
=== Settlements ===
Apart from the town of Dąbrowa Białostocka, Gmina Dąbrowa Białostocka contains 56 settlements, 49 of which are not part of another settlement.

Name	Type	SIMC
Bagny	village	0026420
Bity Kamień	village	0026436
Brzozowo	village	0026442
Brzozowo-Kolonia	colony	0026459
Czarnorzeczka	village	0026962
Grabowo	village	0026465
Grodziszczany	village	0026471
Grzebienie	village	0026488
Hamulka	village	0026494
Harasimowicze	village	0026502
Jaczno	village	0026519
Jałówka	village	0026525
Kamienna Nowa	village	0026643
Kamienna Stara	village	0026850
Bogudzięki (Note: Part of the village of Kamienna Stara.)	part	0026867
Zujkowszczyzna	colony	0026873
Kaszuba	colony	0026821
Kirejewszczyzna	village	0026531
Kropiwno	village	0026548
Krugło	village	0026554
Kuderewszczyzna	village	0026560
Brzozowy Borek (Note: Part of the village of Kuderewszczyzna.)	colony	0026577
Lewki	village	0026583
Łozowo	village	0026590
Małowista	village	0026608
Miedzianowo	village	0026614
Mościcha	village	0026620
Nierośno	village	0026637

Name	Type	SIMC
Nowa Kamienna	settlement	0026650
Nowa Wieś	village	0026666
Nowinka	village	0026672
Olsza	village	0026689
Chorodówki (Note: Part of the village of Olsza.)	part	0026695
Nowa Olszynka	part	0026703
Olszynka	part	0026710
Osmołowszczyzna	village	0026726
Ostrowie	village	0026732
Pięciowłóki	village	0026749
Podbagny	colony	0026755
Pogorzałe	forest settlement	0026838
Prohalino	colony	0026844
Reszkowce	village	0026761
Różanystok	village	0026778
Sadek	colony	0026784
Szatrycha (Note: Part of the colony of Sadek.)	part	0026790
Sadowo	village	0026809
Sławno	colony	0026815
Stock	village	0026880
Suchodolina	village	0026896
Szuszalewo	village	0026904
Trzyrzeczki	village	0026910
Wesołowo	village	0026927
Wiązówka	village	0026933
Wroczyńszczyzna	village	0026940
Zwierzyniec Mały	village	0026956
Zwierzyniec Wielki	village	0026979

=== Sołectwa ===
Gmina Dąbrowa Białostocka is divided into 51 sołectwa.

Name	Sołtys
Bagny	Stanisław Łapciuk
Bity Kamień	Stanisław Pietuszyński
Brzozowo	Ewa Krahel
Brzozowo Kolonia	Romuald Garbecki
Grabowo	Julita Radkiewicz
Grodziszczany	Krzysztof Klejbuk
Grzebienie	Daniel Lewko
Hamulka	Justyna Borowska
Harasimowicze	Piotr Januszkiewicz
Harasimowicze Kolonia	Barbara Kamińska
Jaczno	Mieczysław Gładczuk
Jałówka	Bożena Gryżenia
ul. Jasionówka	Krystyna Ciulewicz
ul. Jasionówka Kolonia	Tadeusz Jedliński
Kamienna Nowa	Marian Wołczek
Kamienna Stara	Beata Kossobudzka
Kamienna Stara Kolonia	Ryszard Myśliwiec
Kirejewszczyzna	Zofia Szyszkiewicz
Kropiwno	Sławomir Mozolewski
Krugło	Janusz Franciszkiewicz
Kuderewszczyzna	Zygmunt Kozłowski
Lewki	Edyta Kaszczewska
Łozowo	Marcin Dziełak
Łozowo Kolonia	Agnieszka Sanik
Małowista	Mateusz Zagórski
ul. Małyszówka	Maciej Poważa
ul. Małyszówka Kolonia	Edmund Raducha

Name	Sołtys
Miedzianowo	Stanisław Krahel
Mościcha	Andrzej Klejbuk
Nierośno	Romuald Orpik
Nowa Wieś	Jarosław Marcińczyk
Nowinka	Robert Czarnecki
Olsza	Leon Stupak
Osmołowszczyzna	Adam Płaskowicki
Ostrowie	Jan Radziewicz
Ostrowie Kolonia	Halina Raducha
Pięciowłóki	Lucyna Marchel
Podbagny	Jerzy Modysław Świetlicki
Reszkowce	Łukasz Walenciej
Sadek	Wiesław Karaś
Sadowo	Katarzyna Jurgilewicz Fisher
Sławno	Agnieszka Suchocka
Stock	Katarzyna Krzwosz
Suchodolina	Anna Puchlik
Szuszalewo	Ewa Stanisławczyk
Trzyrzeczki	Stanisław Grajewski
Wesołowo	Zygmunt Bryzgiel
Wiązówka	Andrzej Pryzmont
Wroczyńszczyzna	Antoni Kowalczuk
Zwierzyniec Mały	Grzegorz Gniedziejko
Zwierzyniec Wielki	Justyna Świderska

== Neighbouring gminas ==
Gmina Dąbrowa Białostocka is bordered by the gminas of Janów, Lipsk, Nowy Dwór, Sidra, Suchowola and Sztabin.
