= Statistics Poland =

Poland's principal government institution in charge of statistics and census data

Coordinates: 52.2167°N 21.0065°E

- Główny Urząd Statystyczny; GUS

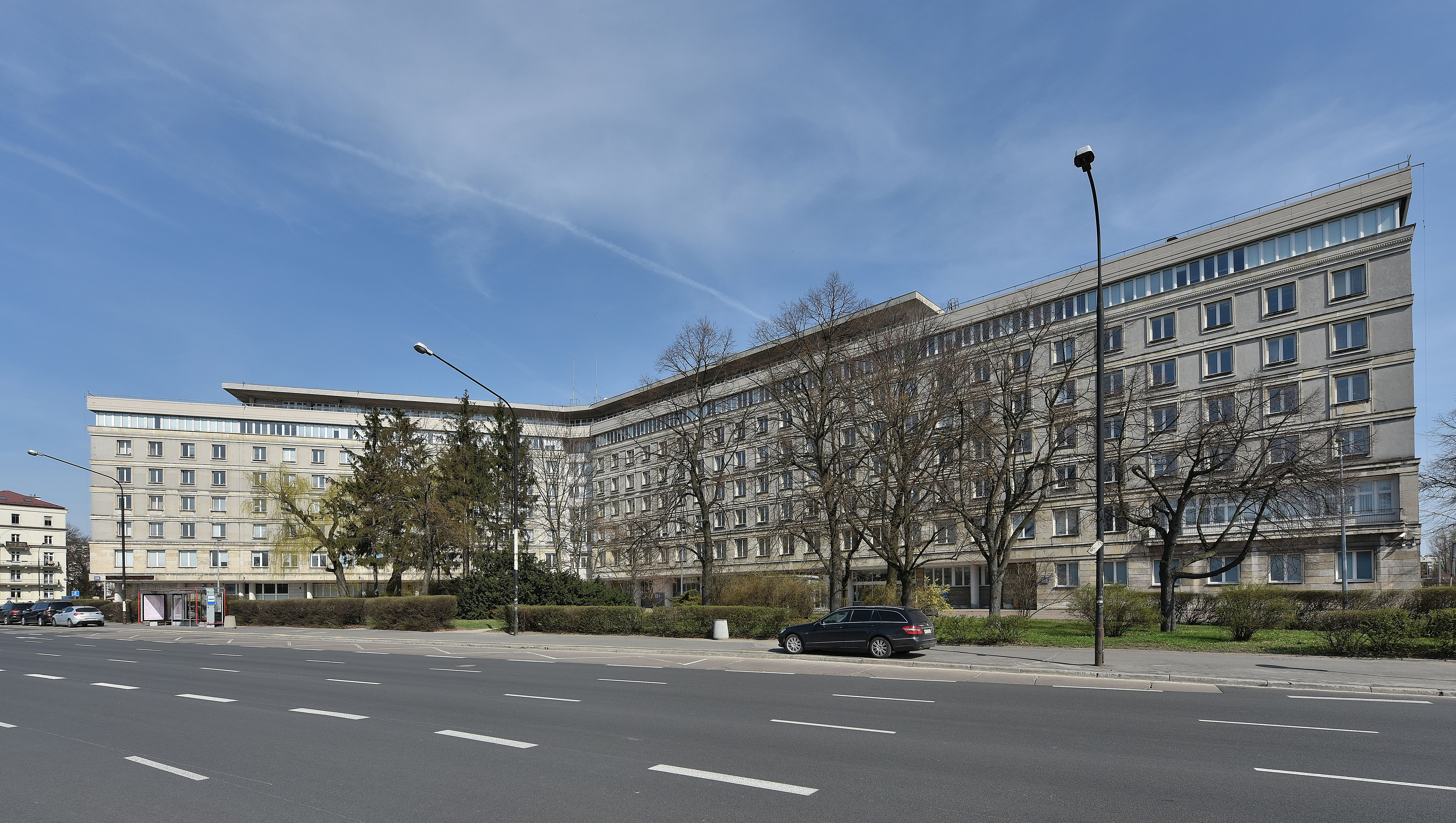

Agency overview
- Formed: 13 July 1918; 108 years ago
- Jurisdiction: Poland
- Headquarters: Warsaw
- Employees: 5726
- Parent agency: Prime Minister of Poland
- Website: stat.gov.pl

Statistics Poland (Polish: Główny Urząd Statystyczny, lit. 'Central Statistical Office', popularly called GUS), formerly known in English as the Central Statistical Office, is the Polish government's chief executive agency charged with collecting and publishing statistics related to the economy, population, and society in Poland, at the national and local levels. The president of Statistics Poland (currently Marek Cierpiał-Wolan) reports directly to the Prime Minister of Poland and is considered the equivalent of a Polish government minister.

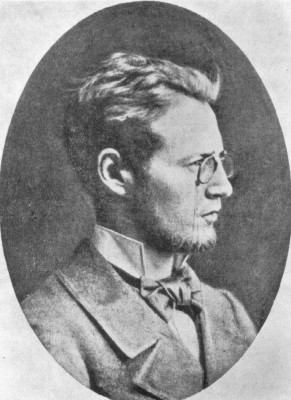
Ludwik Krzywicki

The agency was established on 13 July 1918 by Ludwik Krzywicki, one of the most notable sociologists of his time.

Inactive during World War II, GUS was reorganized in March 1945 and as of 31 July 1947 was under control of the Ordinance of the Council of Ministers (along with the Organization of Official Statistics).

The office is divided into several separate branches, each responsible for a different set of data. The branches include the Divisions of Coordination of Statistical Surveys, Analyses and Regional Statistics, Dissemination, National Accounts and Finance, Business Statistics and Registers, Social Statistics, Services Statistics, Agriculture and Environment Statistics, International Cooperation, Budgetary, and Personnel.

Notable GUS publications include Rocznik Statystyczny (Statistical Yearbook), Mały Rocznik Statystyczny (Concise Statistical Yearbook), Demographic Yearbook of Poland, and Wiadomości Statystyczne (The Polish Statistician).

In November 2018 GUS estimated that the average monthly wage in Poland was PLN 4,966 (€1,158, $1,317). According to GUS, during the same month Poland's retail sales increased by 8.2% year-on-year and fell by 2.7% month-on-month while the economy as a whole grew at an annual rate of 5.1%. In December 2018, prices of consumer goods and services increased by 1.1% from the previous year while wages rose 1% from the previous month and unemployment rose .1%.

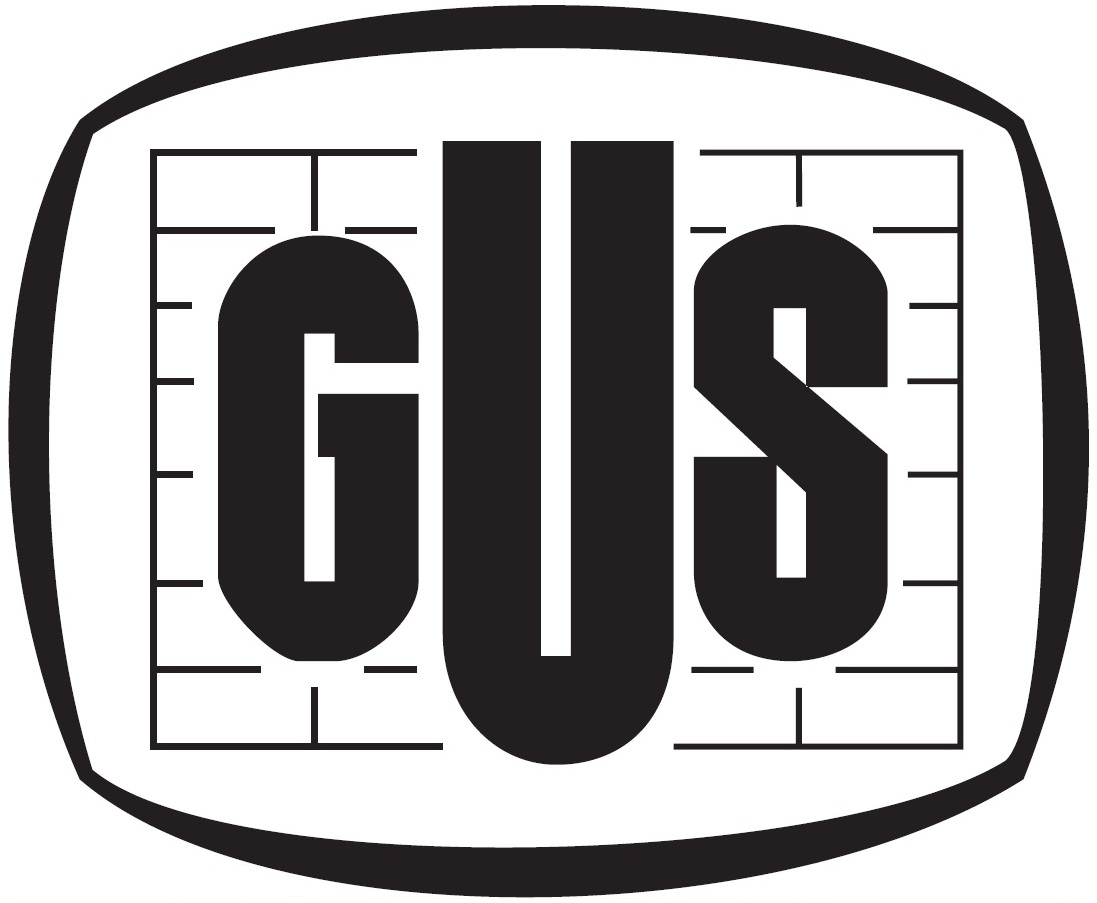
Former GUS logo

== Former presidents ==
- 1918–1929 Józef Buzek
- 1929–1939 Edward Szturm de Sztrem
- 1939–1945 vacant
- 1945–1949 Stefan Szulc
- 1949–1965 Zygmunt Pudowicz
- 1965–1972 Wincenty Kawalec
- 1972–1980 Stanisław Kuziński
- 1980–1989 Wiesław Sadowski
- 1989–1991 Franciszek Kubiczek
- 1991–1992 Bohdan Wyżnikiewicz
- 1992–1995 Józef Oleński
- 1995–2006 Tadeusz Toczyński
- 2006–2006 Janusz Witkowski (acting)
- 2006–2011 Józef Oleński
- 2011–2016 Janusz Witkowski
- 2016–2024 Dominik Rozkrut
- since 2025 Marek Cierpiał-Wolan

== See also ==
- Census in Poland
