= Postal codes in Poland =

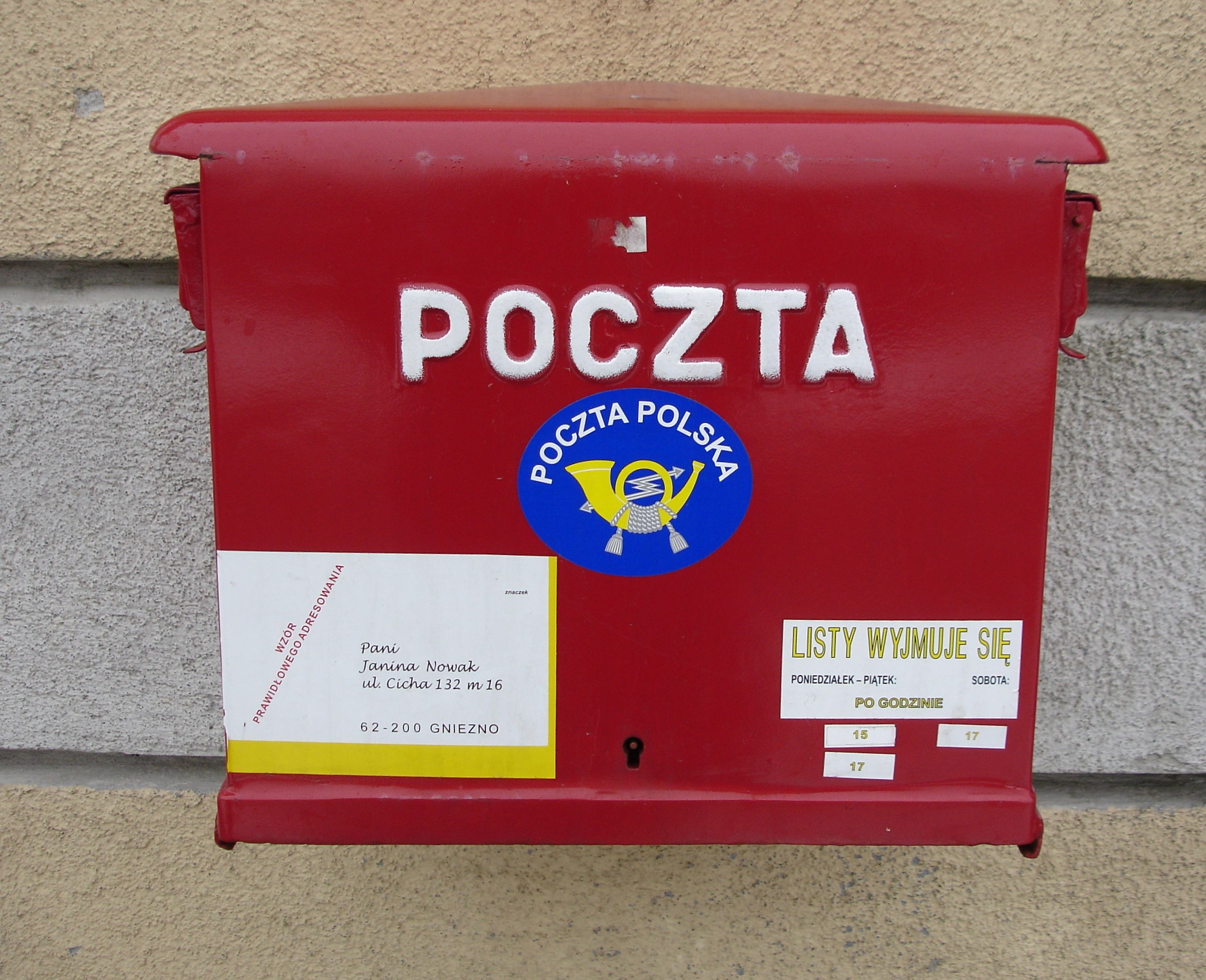
Polish post office letter box.

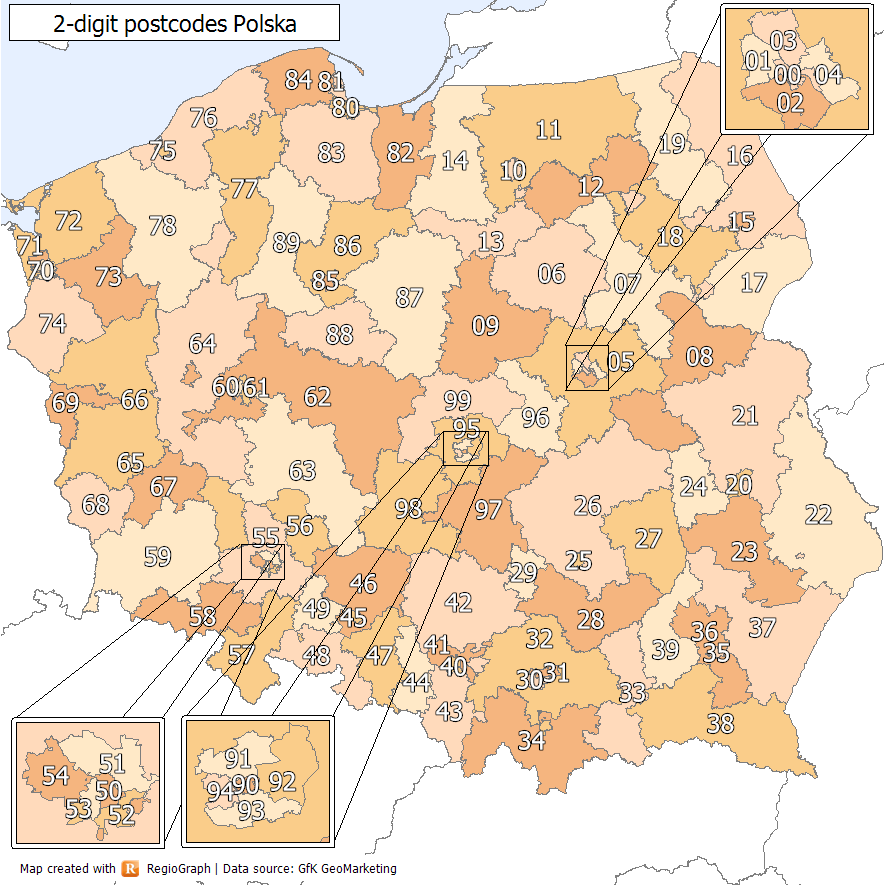
2-digit postcode areas Poland(defined through the first two postcode digits)

In Poland, postal codes are used for assigning post to addresses. They were introduced in 1973. They are five-digit codes of two-then-three digits, with a hyphen between them. The first digit indicates one of the 10 large postal regions the country is divided into. These areas do not follow the administrative divisions. The second and third digits specify a particular smaller region (originally the number of a regional sorting office, there was one in every county), and the last two are the number of a postal delivery branch.

Clients receiving particularly large volumes of mail may have their own unique postal codes; the same goes for PO Box lobbies of the largest post offices.

Postal codes are written in Poland before the city/town/locality name, e.g. 00-001 Warszawa.

First digit in the postal code represents the postal district, second digit major geographical subdivision of this district, and the three digits after dash: the post office, or in case of large cities: particular street, part of the street or even separate address (in the last case code is in the form of xy-9zz). Thus the postal code 70-952 means:

- 7 – postal district of Szczecin,
- 0 – subdivision of that district, in this case the Western Part of Szczecin,
- 9 – denotes special code, and
- 52 – Office of the District Attorney (Prokuratura Okręgowa).

Similarly, the code for 70-470 denotes the odd numbers from 1 to 27 in the Wojska Polskiego Street in Szczecin, and 34-434 is a code for whole town of Dębno near Nowy Targ (3 – postal district of Kraków, 4 – subdivision of that district, 434 the town of Dębno – strictly speaking the post office in Dębno).

Postal districts and their subdivisions are not related to the administrative division of Poland.

== Main postal areas ==
The first digit of a Polish postal code specifies the large area (postal region) to which the address concerned belongs. The numbers run clockwise around the map of Poland, from Warsaw (0) in the central east of the country, through east, south, west and north and then back to Łódź (9), close to the geographical centre of Poland. Each region is operated by one of the Poczta Polska's regional divisions (oddział regionalny), located in the following cities:

- 0 - Warsaw
- 1 - Olsztyn
- 2 - Lublin
- 3 - Kraków
- 4 - Katowice
- 5 - Wrocław
- 6 - Poznań
- 7 - Szczecin
- 8 - Gdańsk
- 9 - Łódź

== Special codes ==
Codes in the format N0-9NN, e.g. are reserved for bigger clients (e.g. "Telewizja Polska, 00-999 Warszawa"), and internal postal use, (e.g. "60-900 Poznań 2" when addressing post office #2 in Poznań).

Such postal codes route the mail directly to the recipient, therefore a street address is not necessary. This is similar to the French CEDEX.

== Postal codes used for more than one settlement ==
Unlike other European postal codes the place names related to the postal codes in Poland can be more than one.

Postal code 62-262 are valid with 5 different place names:

- 62-262 Wierzyce
- 62-262 Przyborowo
- 62-262 Chwałkówko
- 62-262 Fałkowo
- 62-262 Imielno

Other examples are: 09-135, 12-250, 16-424, 32-104, 55-300, 62-010, and 98-338.
