= Battle of Laski and Anielin =

- Part of the Eastern Front of World War I
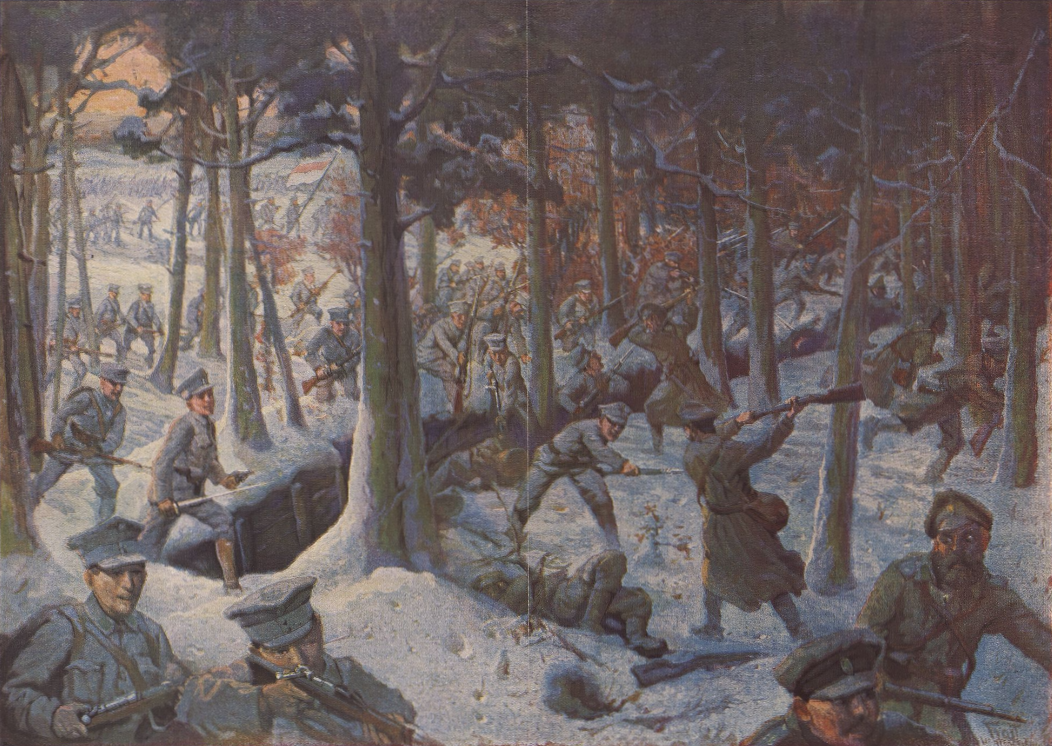
- Assault of Polish legionnaires ahead of Ivangorod, 22-26 October 1914 (M. Frost)
Date	October 22–26, 1914
Location	Anielin and Laski, Congress Poland, Russian Empire
Result	Russian victory
Territorial changes	Austro-Hungarian forces fall back to avoid encirclement

Belligerents
Austria-Hungary (Polish Legions)	Russian Empire

Commanders and leaders
Józef Piłsudski; Edward Rydz-Śmigły; Michał Rola-Żymierski	Unknown

Casualties and losses
Unknown	Unknown

The Battle of Laski and Anielin took place on October 22–26, 1914, during World War I. 1st Brigade, Polish Legions, a unit of the Austro-Hungarian Army commanded by Józef Piłsudski, clashed with the Imperial Russian Army near Anielin and Laski. The battle was part of the so-called Ivangorod Operation, during which the Austro-Hungarians tried to capture the Dęblin Fortress (known at that time as Ivangorod), and cross the Vistula.

== Battle ==
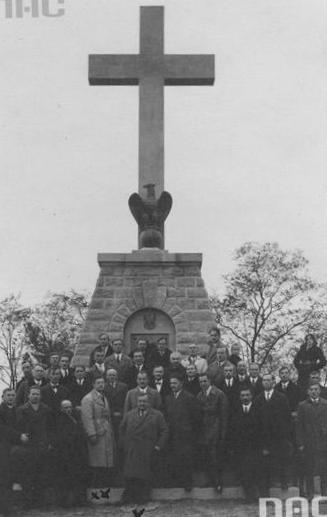
Monument to the Polish legionaries who died during the battle

The battle began in the night of October 22/23, 1914, when 3rd Company of 3rd Battalion of Captain Edward Rydz-Śmigły was sent on a reconnaissance mission near the fortress. At the same time, Austrian headquarters ordered 1st Legions Regiment to seize the crossings over the Zagozdzonka river and capture hills located on its eastern bank. The Regiment was tasked with holding these positions until the arrival of Austrian 46th Division, and its two battalions: 5th and 6th were sent into the battle. In the morning the battalions achieved the objectives, followed by other subunits of the Regiment. In the afternoon, a battle with three Russian regiments took place near Anielin.

On October 23, 1st Battalion of Captain Michal Zymierski captured Russian trenches near the village of Laski. Polish forces suffered heavy losses, with a number of officers killed. In the night of October 23/24, additional Polish battalions entered the battle, but the Russians had initiated their own attack, and Austrian soldiers retreated. To avoid encirclement, Polish battalions also had to abandon their positions, in the night of October 26/27.

== Commemoration ==
In 1933, at the Żytkowice rail station, located in the village of Brzustow, Masovian Voivodeship, a commemorative monument was erected, with names and noms de guerre of Polish Legions soldiers, killed in the battle.

The battle is commemorated on the Tomb of the Unknown Soldier, Warsaw, with the inscription "LASKI ANIELIN 21–24 X 1914".

== Sources ==
- Mieczysław Wrzosek, Polski czyn zbrojny podczas pierwszej wojny światowej 1914–1918, Państwowe Wydawnictwo "Wiedza Powszechna", Warszawa 1990
