= German atrocities committed against prisoners of war during World War II =

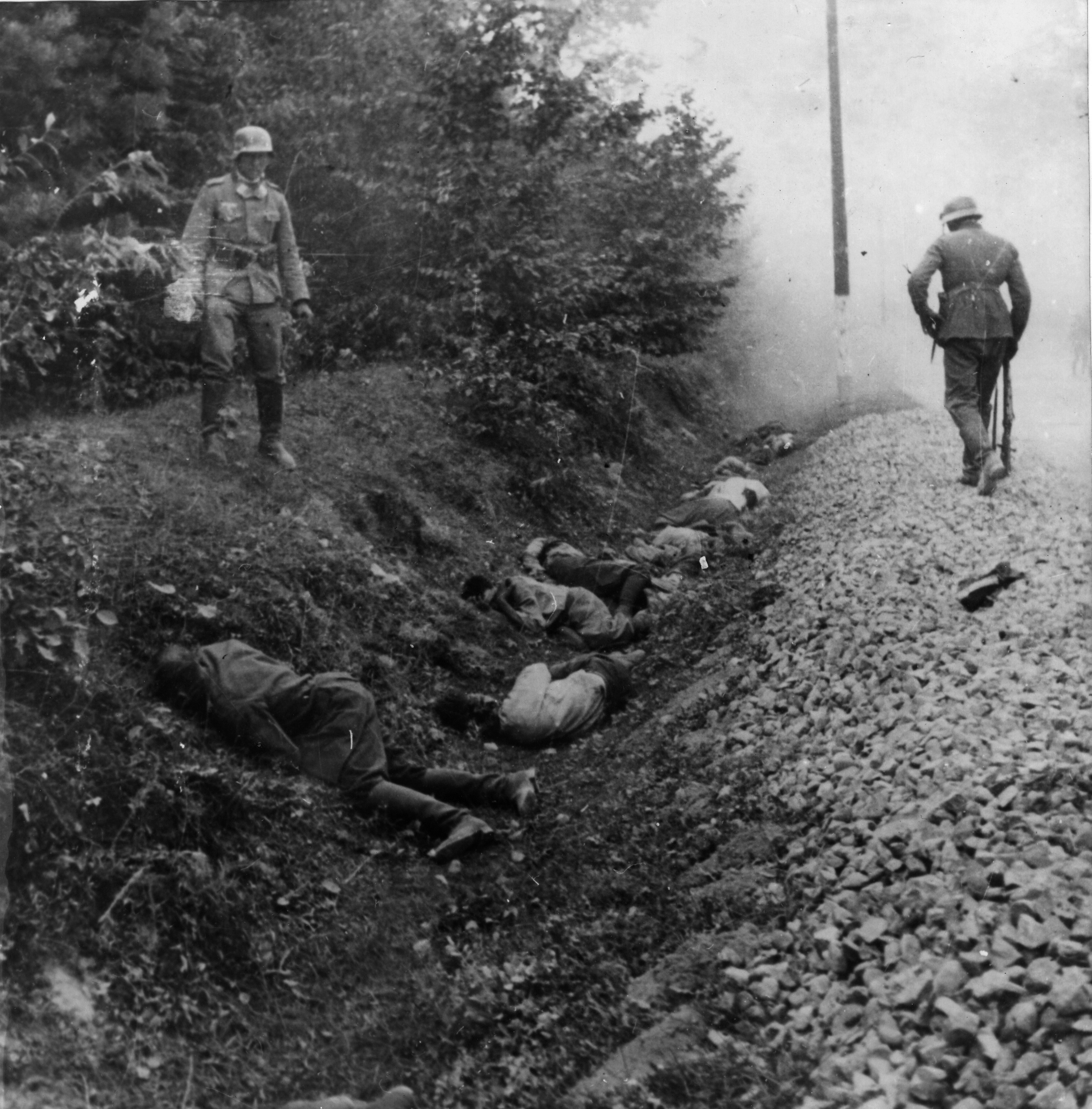
About 300 Polish POWs were executed by soldiers of the German 15th Motorized Infantry Regiment in Ciepielów on 9 September 1939.

During World War II, Nazi Germany committed many atrocities against prisoners of war (POWs). German mistreatment and war crimes against prisoners of war began in the first days of the war during their invasion of Poland, with an estimated 3,000 Polish POWs murdered in dozens of incidents. The treatment of POWs by the Germans varied based on the country; in general, the Germans treated POWs belonging to the Western Allies well, while the opposite was true on the Eastern Front.

It was the German treatment of Soviet prisoners of war that became most infamous: Soviet POWs held by Nazi Germany, primarily in the custody of the German Army, were routinely starved and subjected to deadly conditions. Of the nearly six million who were captured, around three million died during their imprisonment. Italian prisoners were also particularly subjected to German atrocities.

== Invasion of Poland (1939–) ==
During the German invasion of Poland, which started World War II, Nazi Germany carried out a number of atrocities involving Polish prisoners of war (POWs). The first documented massacres of Polish POWs took place as early as the first day of the war; others followed (ex. the Serock massacre of 5 September). During that period, the Wehrmacht is estimated to have mass-murdered at least 3,000 Polish POWs, with the largest atrocities being the Ciepielów massacre of 8 September 1939 (~300 victims) and the Zambrów massacre of 13–14 September (~200 victims). Most of those atrocities are classified as war crimes of the Wehrmacht.

Polish POWs at POW camps, temporary or long-term, have been poorly treated; Bob Moore noted that "some of the [poor] conditions could be ascribed to the speed of the German victory and the lack of adequate preparation, [but] there is no doubt that ill-treatment was also deliberately inflicted." Polish soldiers in the POW camps were treated worse than Western Allies; in some cases Germans argued that Poland no longer exists as a country, so Polish soldiers should not have the POW status; generally however Polish prisoners were afforded legal protection. However, in a prelude to The Holocaust, Jewish soldiers with the Polish Army were also more likely than others to be victims of various atrocities; only Jewish officers were treated reasonably well – most of the enlisted and non-commissioned Jewish soldiers perished in the Holocaust. Later, during the German occupation of Poland which lasted until early 1945, captured Polish resistance fighters were routinely executed by German forces.

== Western front (1940–) ==
Likewise, following the increased hostilities and German victories on the Western front, Germans carried out a number of massacres of the Western Allied forces, such as the Le Paradis massacre (97 victims) or the Wormhoudt massacre (81 victims). Racial policies of Germany resulted in particular cruel treatment of the black soldiers from the French colonies (Senegalese Tirailleurs). It is believed that between 1,500 and 3,000 of them were killed in war crimes carried out by the Wehrmacht, often after surrendering, in incidents such as the Bois d'Eraine massacre and the Chasselay massacre. Survivors were treated much more harshly than white soldiers of comparable rank. Similarly, Nazi treatment of British colonial forces (mostly captured in North Africa) was worse than those of their European counterparts.

In a breach of international conventions, French prisoners of war were tasked with clearing the minefields from the Maginot Line (after the war, this was used as justification by many Allied states to employ the German POWs in the same fashion). French resistance members were killed in events like the Saint-Genis-Laval massacre (120 victims). Massacres of POWs on the Western front took place again after D-Day in 1944, for example the Malmedy massacre (84 victims) or the Normandy massacres (156 victims). It has been estimated between hundreds to over a thousand of Allied airmen were killed in various incidents shortly after capture, sometimes by civilians enraged by the bombing of Germany (see for example the Rüsselsheim massacre); many others were abused.

== Eastern front (1941–1945) ==
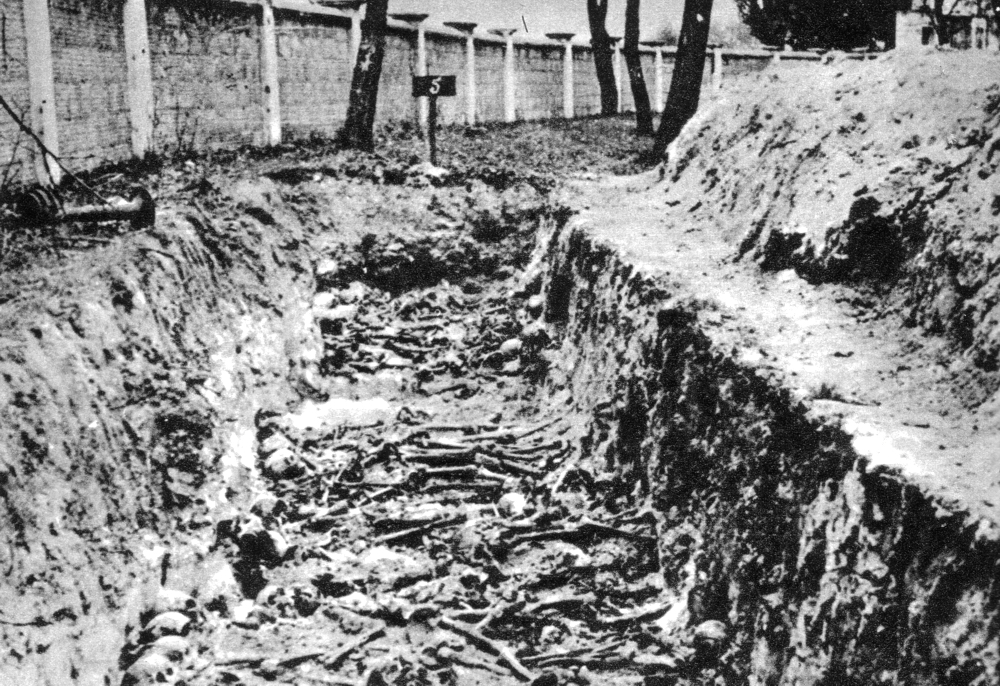
Mass grave of Soviet soldiers at the Stalag 307 camp in Dęblin Fortress, German-occupied Poland

In June 1941, Germany and its allies invaded the Soviet Union and carried out a war of extermination with complete disregard for the laws and customs of war. Among the criminal orders issued before the invasion was for the execution of captured Soviet commissars. By the end of 1941, over three million Soviet soldiers had been captured, mostly in large-scale encirclement operations during the German Army's rapid advance. Two-thirds of them had died from starvation, exposure, and disease by early 1942. This is one of the highest sustained death rates for any mass atrocity in history.

Soviet Jews, political commissars, and some other groups were systematically targeted for execution. More prisoners were shot because they were wounded, ill, or unable to keep up with forced marches. Others died during harsh forced labor conditions. More than 100,000 were transferred to Nazi concentration camps, where they were treated worse than most other prisoners. Deaths among these Soviet prisoners of war have been called "one of the greatest crimes in military history". The total number of the deaths of prisoners of war from the Soviet Union greatly exceeded deaths of prisoners from other nationalities. About 3.3 million Soviet POWs perished under German jurisdiction. With regards to the mortality rate, it is estimated at forty three to as high as sixty three percent. German crimes against the POWs on the Eastern Front were not limited to those against the Soviet soldiers; Polish soldiers serving under Soviet command have also been victims of several massacres, with the largest atrocities in 1945 being the Podgaje massacre (~200 victims) and the Horka massacre (~300 victims).

In numerous documented instances, captured Soviet soldiers were subjected to torture and mutilation. They were branded with red-hot irons, had body parts such as eyes, ears, hands, fingers, and tongues cut out, their stomachs ripped open, were repeatedly bayoneted while alive, torn apart after being tied to tanks, and burned or buried alive.

== Commando Order (1942-) ==
The Commando Order was issued by the OKW, the high command of the German Armed Forces, on 18 October 1942. This order stated that all Allied commandos captured in Europe and Africa should be summarily executed without trial, even if in proper uniforms or if they attempted to surrender. Dozens of Allied special forces soldiers were executed as the result of this order.

== Italy (1943–) ==
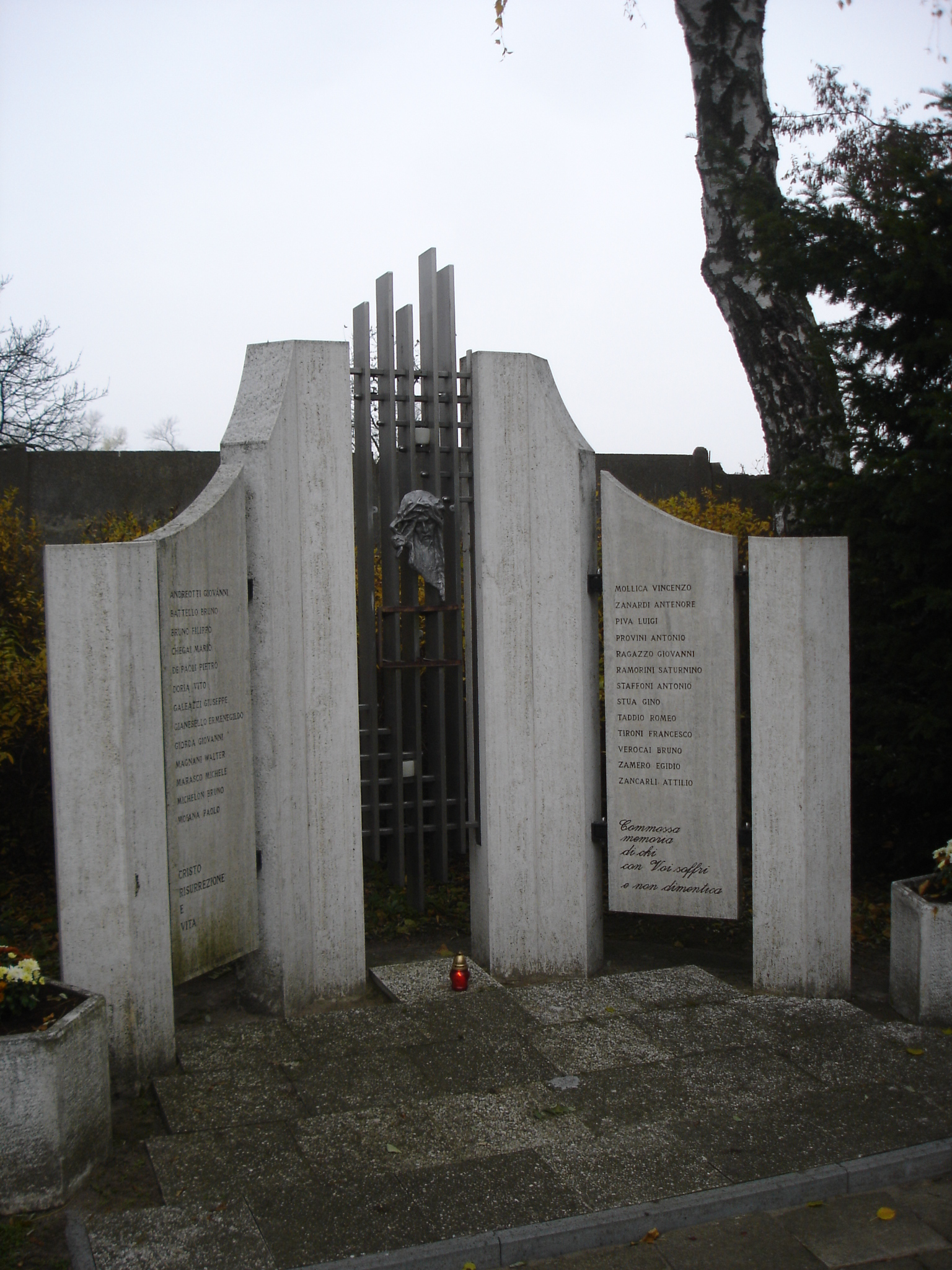
Memorial to Italian POWs who died in the Stalag II-D camp, Stargard, Poland

In the days immediately following the World War II armistice between Italy and Allied armed forces (8 September 1943), most of the Italian army refused to participate in the war and were subsequently interned by the Germans. Approximately one million were interned by the Germans following Italian surrender. Some were victims of mass executions and massacres, perpetrated by the Germans. Some were subject to harsh forced labors or even sent to Nazi concentration camps. Others were interned in the camps, where they suffered from the second highest mortality rate of prisoners in German captivity (six to seven percent). Some soldiers were murdered before reaching POW camps, e.g. the 5,000 victims of the Massacre of the Acqui Division.

== The March (1945) ==
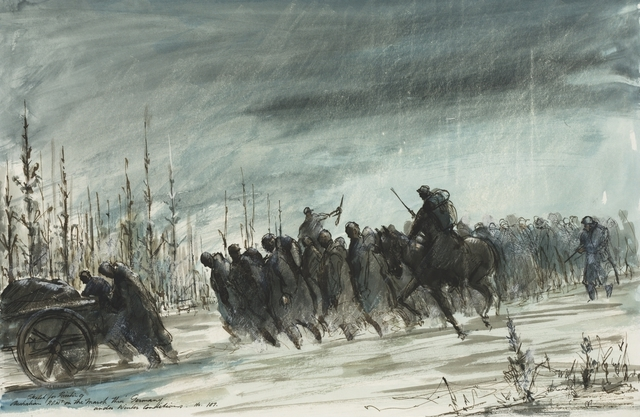
A drawing of Australian POWs being marched through Germany during the winter of 1944–45

"The March" refers to a series of forced marches during the final stages of the Second World War in Europe that were enforced on prisoners of war under German control, as Germans were falling back and tried to prevent the recapture of the POWs by the Allies (primarily, the Soviets); many POWs, estimated at thousands, died during that event. The exact number is unknown, and even the rough estimates can vary.

== POW camps ==
=== Forced labor ===
As the war went on, Germany increasingly used POWs for forced labor, despite this being a violation of international treaties. This particularly affected prisoners from countries other than US and the British Commonwealth, who in general were subject to harsher treatment in the camps. Many lower ranking prisoners from regions occupied by the Germans (for example, this affected Polish, Soviet, Yugoslav, French and later, Italian soldiers) were released from the POWs camps then immediately forced to sign up for labor contracts with German authorities; which technically did not violate international treaties as they were no longer POWs at this point. In 1944, almost two million prisoners of war worked as forced laborers in Germany.

=== Mortality rate at POW camps ===
Mortality rates for non-Soviet POWs at German camps were at 1–6%, depending on the group. Gerlach cites estimates of about 1% for British and US prisoners, 1–2.8% for French prisoners, 2–2.5% for Belgians, 2–3% for Dutch prisoners, 2–4% for Poles, 3–6% for Yugoslavs, and 6–7% for Italians.

The situation of Jews, who served in various armies, was particularly difficult because of the Holocaust. However, while Jews were mistreated by the Germans more than non-Jews, their fates were generally tied to the nations and armies they belonged to. Soviet Jewish POWs fared terribly; as Moore noted, "the treatment of Jewish prisoners of war on the Eastern Front was even more extreme than that meted out to non-Jews." Non-officer Jews who served in the Polish Army were released into the general populace and perished alongside the civilians. However, most Jews who served in the armies of the Western Allies, as well as Jewish officers in the Polish Army, suffered relatively minor discrimination, and their situation was relatively similar to that of their Gentile counterparts in British or American armies.

=== Executions at POW camps ===
Memorial to the Allied airmen executed after the "Great Escape", Żagań, Poland

In several instances, POWs held at POW camps were executed for various reasons that were deemed war crimes in subsequent investigations; the most infamous of these were the Stalag Luft III murders on 25 March 1944, following the mostly unsuccessful "Great Escape" of the POWs; 50 of them were executed as a punishment. A similar incident involved a few dozen Polish officers who were executed after having been recaptured during the failed escape attempt in 1943 from the Oflag VI-B.

Some of these incidents have been attributed to Aktion Kugel, a secret decree issued by the head of Gestapo, Heinrich Müller in 1944, which stipulated that all recaptured escapees from the POW camps other than British or American were to be taken to Mauthausen concentration camp and executed. It has been estimated that as many as 5,000 Allied POWs might have been killed as a result of this decree.

== Aftermath ==
The first trials of Germans accused of crimes against prisoners of war took place in the Soviet Union while the war was ongoing; meanwhile, Western allies were still gathering information through the United Nations War Crimes Commission. The first such American trial was in early April 1945; Captain Curt Bruns was convicted of murdering two prisoners during the Battle of the Bulge. The second sentenced local Nazi leader Peter Back and two civilians to death for murdering a downed American pilot in August 1944. In addition, by the end of August 1945 a Central Registry of War Criminals and Security Suspects (CROWCASS) was established in Paris for all Nazi war criminals. By 1947, it listed over 60,000 suspects; only a fraction were ever prosecuted.

Shortly after World War II, at the Nuremberg trials (in particular, during the High Command Trial), numerous German crimes against prisoners of war were found to be a direct breach of the laws of war (in particular, the Geneva and the Hague conventions). Almost all of the German high commanders tried during that trial were found to be guilty of crimes against POWs. Despite the trial, German public's awareness of the war crimes committed by its regular army (Wehrmacht), did not arise until the late 90s (see myth of the clean Wehrmacht).

== Historiography ==
Germany has signed the 1929 Geneva Convention on Prisoners of War. However, a number of scholars noted that Germany did not adhere to the Geneva convention well. Szymon Datner, one of the first historians researching this topic, concluded in the 1960s that "During the Second World War, Germany trampled upon all the rules of international law, including those concerning war prisoners". Charles Rollings likewise noted that the Axis powers, as well as USSR, "ignored [Geneva] provisions to a great or lesser degree", particularly in the Eastern Front. Henryk Tomiczek wrote that "The Germans manipulated the Geneva principles, often breaking them". Vasilis Vourkoutiotis noted that the German High Command consciously decided not to abide by the Geneva Convention, for example by failing to provide adequate food rations to the POWs. Simon MacKenzie noted that "Particular provisions of the Geneva Convention were regularly being violated" in Germany, particularly in the context of forced labor for non-Anglophone POWs.

Bob Moore, in the context of German atrocities against Polish POWs, wrote that the number and breadth of various incidents "suggests that at the very least the Wehrmacht had little regard for the niceties of the Geneva Convention if it did not suit them" and that later, the camp conditions of Polish POWs were inferior to these stipulated by the convention. He also observed that German atrocities "cannot be attributed to brutalization caused by long-term exposure to close-quarter combat as many of the incidents took place within days, and sometimes hours, of hostilities beginning." Alexander B. Rossino, also in the context of Polish campaign, noted that Germans were expected to respect the Geneva convention "During the [Polish] campaign, however, German troops frequently overlooked or disregarded these rules and regulations when Polish military personnel fell into their hands... Despite international legal constraints and the army's own regulations, of which every German soldier was aware, prisoners of war were mercilessly gunned down, starved, beaten, and abused on every day that the war in Poland was fought."

On the other hand, Gerlach wrote that "German military treated prisoners, except those from the USSR, largely according to the international laws of war". In the Peter Back case, two German soldiers on leave had protested his killing the American pilot; of the 800 such war crimes cases investigated by late summer 1945 almost all involved civilians or police, not soldiers. Hitler and some of his close associates like Goebbels were more critical of the Geneva Convention than more traditional officers in the German military. In several cases, Hitler argued for abandoning the Geneva Conventions (in particular, for commandos and airmen), only for his arguments to be rebuked or quietly ignored by others. German military was significantly motivated in its restraint against the British and American POW's by the fear of retribution against German prisoners in American or British hands.

== See also ==
- Prisoners of war in World War II
- Soviet atrocities committed against prisoners of war during World War II
