= Nieciecz =

Nieciecz may refer to the following places:

- Nieciecz, Lublin Voivodeship (east Poland)
- Nieciecz, Lubusz Voivodeship (west Poland)
- Nieciecz, Masovian Voivodeship (east-central Poland)
