= Baj Pomorski Theatre =

Polish puppet theatre

Coordinates: 53.0104°N 18.6125°E

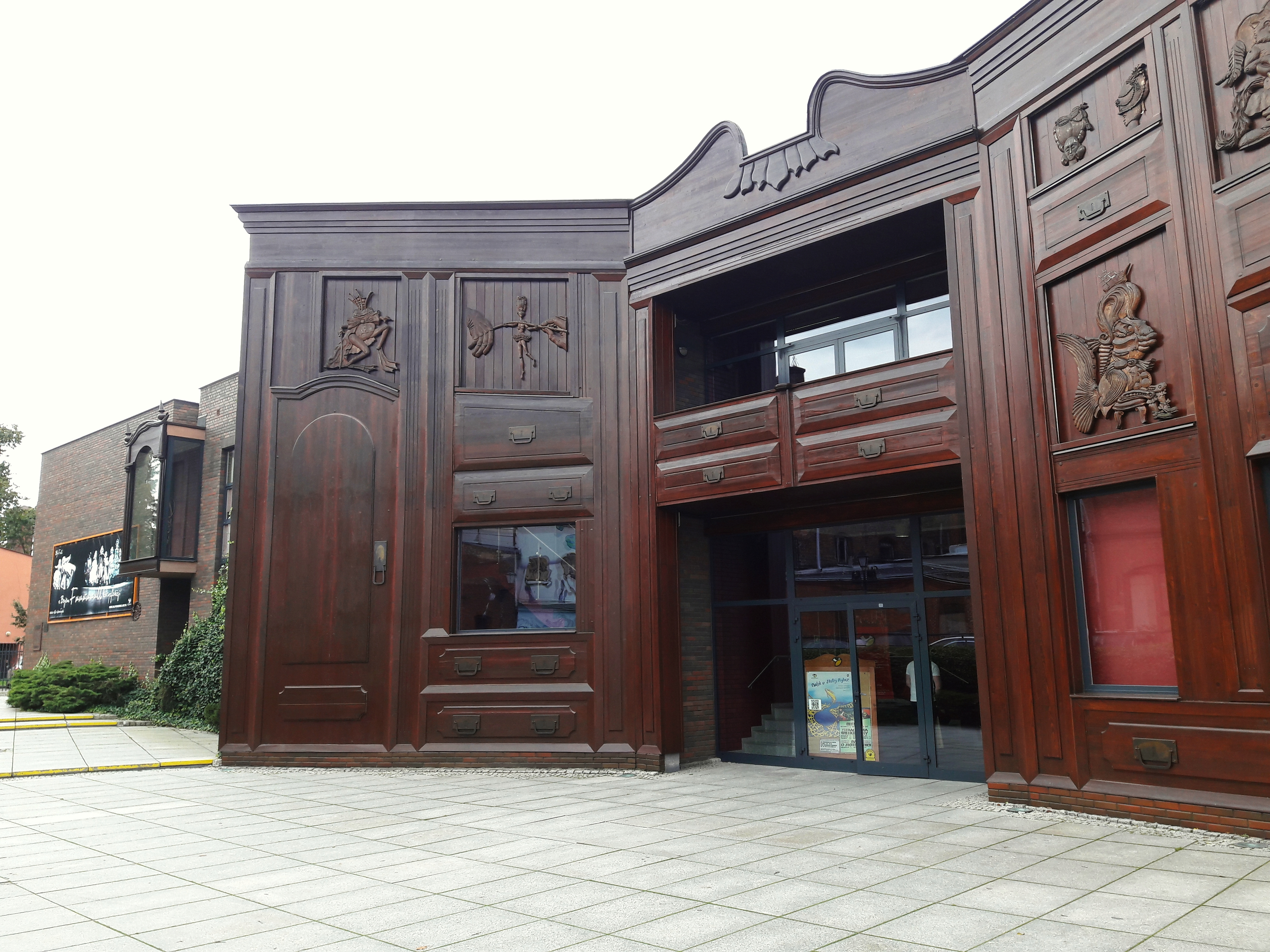
The Baj Pomorski Theatre, a puppet theater in Toruń, Poland

The Baj Pomorski Theatre is a Polish puppet theatre, founded by Irena Pikiel-Samorewiczowa in 1945.

== History ==
The Baj Pomorski Theatre was founded by Irena Pikiel-Samorewiczowa, who was enlisted by The Ministry of Arts and Culture to organize the first puppet theatre in Pomerania. The theatre was originally situated in the city's slaughterhouse, which had functioned as a German marionette theatre during Nazi occupation. On October 28, 1945, the theatre premiered Ewa Szelburg-Zarembina's Little Wandering Taylor. However, the conditions of the stage did not meet the needs of the puppet theatre, so Pikiel accepted the proposal to move the headquarters of Baj Pomorski to Toruń. In April 1946, the Theatre was granted a building at 9 Piernikarska Street, which had previously belonged to the German Castle Theatre during the war.

The first performers at the Baj Pomorski were students from Nicolaus Copernicus University, who participated puppet animation workshops. Despite limited resources, the theatre was able to deliver numerous touring performances across Poland.

The theatre took its first steps in promoting new European literature for children in the 1990s. In 1994, Sieńko initiated Toruń's Meetings of Puppet Theaters. In 1999, this evolved to become Toruń's International Meetings of Puppet Theaters.

== Directors ==
During the 1960s, under Śmigielski's management, the theatre transitioned from a traditional puppet stage to more experimental works. The Club of Creative Circles Azyl was formed during that time, making Baj Pomorski the center of cultural life in Poland.

Konrad Szachnowski made his name at Baj's by coming up with a modern concept for staging theatrical classics. His preview puppet show of Fernando de Rojas’ Celestine found its place in Polish puppet theatre's historic lore by using supermarionettes and "trashy theatre".

The eight years of Antoni Słociński's management resulted in the development of theatrical education programs for children.

The following directors – Krzysztof Arciszewski and Wojciech Olejnik – presumably continued to expand upon programs based upon previously developed images of the theatre. An important modification introduced during that time was the transformation of the theatre into an institution financed by the City of Toruń.

The present director of Baj Pomorski has turned Baj Pomorski into an open theatre.

The following directors of the theatre were:

- Stanisław Stapf (1950–1960)
- Leszek Śmigielski (1960–1972)
- Tadeusz Petrykowski was an artistic director (1972–1979), at that time the managing directors were: Eugeniusz Synak (1972-1976), Karol Mroziński (1976-1979),
- Konrad Szachnowski (1979–1980)
- Antoni Słociński (1980–1988)
- Krzysztof Arciszewski (1988–1992)
- Wojciech Olejnik (1992–1993)
- Czesław Sieńko (1993–2003)
- Zbigniew Lisowski (2003–present)

== Selected references ==
- Marzena Wiśniewska, History of Toruń's puppet scene in 1945-2005 in: 60 years of The Baj Pomorski Theatre, Toruń, 2005.

English translation by Agnieszka Klonowska and Wolf V. Werling
