= Gmina Puławy =

Gmina Puławy Puławy Commune
- Gmina
- Coat of arms
- Interactive map of Gmina Puławy
- Coordinates (Puławy): 51°25′N 21°58′E
- Country: Poland
- Voivodeship: Lublin
- County: Puławy
- Seat: Puławy

Area
  - Total: 160.81 km^{2} (62.09 sq mi)

Population (2015)
  - Total: 11,913
  - Density: 74.081/km^{2} (191.87/sq mi)
- Website: https://gminapulawy.pl/

Gmina Puławy is a rural gmina (administrative district) in Puławy County, Lublin Voivodeship, in eastern Poland. Its seat is the town of Puławy, although the town is not part of the territory of the gmina.

The gmina covers an area of 160.81 square kilometres (62.1 sq mi), and as of 2006 its total population is 11,172 (11,913 in 2015).

== Villages ==
Gmina Puławy contains the villages and settlements of Anielin, Borowa, Borowina, Bronowice, Dobrosławów, Gołąb, Góra Puławska, Janów, Jaroszyn, Kajetanów, Klikawa, Kochanów, Kolonia Góra Puławska, Kowala, Łęka, Leokadiów, Matygi, Niebrzegów, Nieciecz, Opatkowice, Pachnowola, Piskorów, Polesie, Sadłowice, Skoki, Smogorzów, Sosnów, Tomaszów, Wólka Gołębska and Zarzecze.

== Neighbouring gminas ==
Gmina Puławy is bordered by the towns of Dęblin and Puławy, and by the gminas of Gniewoszów, Janowiec, Policzna, Przyłęk, Ryki, Sieciechów and Żyrzyn.
