= Jaroszyn, Lublin Voivodeship =

Jaroszyn
- Village
- Location within Poland
- Coordinates: 51°25′34″N 21°56′3″E
- Country: Poland
- Voivodeship: Lublin
- County: Puławy
- Gmina: Puławy

Jaroszyn [jaˈrɔʂɨn] is a village in the administrative district of Gmina Puławy, within Puławy County, Lublin Voivodeship, in eastern Poland.
