= Kochanów, Lublin Voivodeship =

Kochanów
- Village
- Location within Poland
- Coordinates: 51°24′N 21°51′E
- Country: Poland
- Voivodeship: Lublin
- County: Puławy
- Gmina: Puławy

Kochanów [kɔˈxanuf] is a village in the administrative district of Gmina Puławy, within Puławy County, Lublin Voivodeship, in eastern Poland.
