= Janów, Puławy County =

Janów
- Village
- Location within Poland
- Coordinates: 51°24′33″N 21°51′9″E
- Country: Poland
- Voivodeship: Lublin
- County: Puławy
- Gmina: Puławy

Janów [ˈjanuf] is a village in the administrative district of Gmina Puławy, within Puławy County, Lublin Voivodeship, in eastern Poland.
