= Central Registry of War Criminals and Security Suspects =

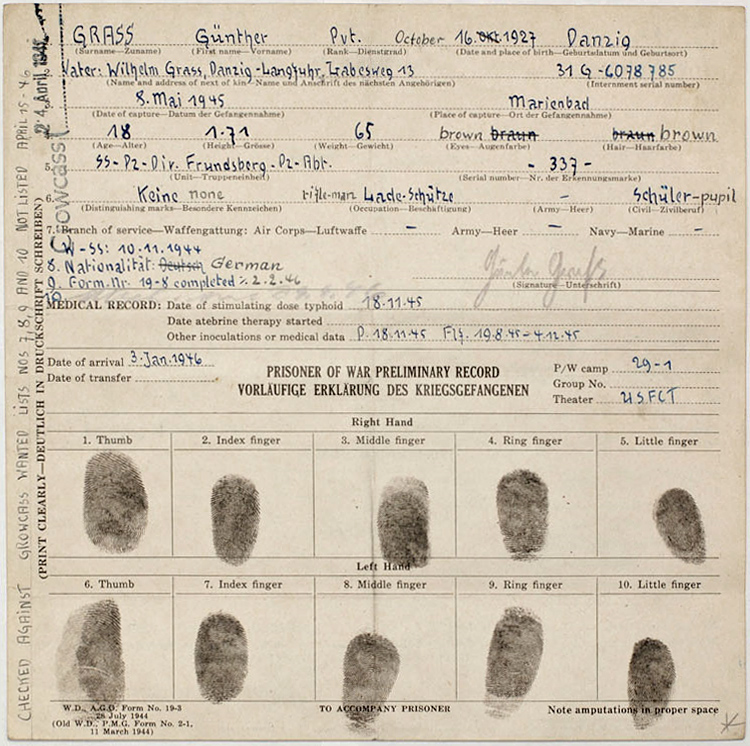
The prisoner of war record of German author and Nobel Prize winner Günter Grass as of his capture as a Waffen-SS soldier at the end of World War II.

The Central Registry of War Criminals and Security Suspects, more commonly known as CROWCASS, was an organisation set up to assist the United Nations War Crimes Commission and Allied governments in tracing ex-enemy nationals suspected of committing war crimes or atrocities in Europe during the Second World War. The organisation was originally set up by the Supreme Headquarters Allied Expeditionary Force (SHAEF) in 1945.

The CROWCASS list grew to 150,000 suspects. In 1947, CROWCASS published a four volume list divided into Germans, Non Germans and two supplementary lists of people suspected of committing war crimes between September 1939 and May 1945. To Allied Nazi hunters the CROWCASS lists became known as the 'Nazi Hunter's Bible'. The lists contain over 60,000 people in all. Not all of them are war criminals (some were simply being sought for interrogation or to act as witnesses), however within the pages of CROWCASS are the alleged perpetrators of tens of thousands of war crimes. Among those on the list are Case Registry No 1: Adolf Hitler - wanted for murder by Poland, Czechoslovakia and Belgium.

In 2005, the British government sanctioned the publication of the CROWCASS Consolidated Wanted Lists. Originally the lists were not intended to be in the public domain until the year 2023.

== See also ==
- Central Registry of War Criminals and Security Suspects from the Kingdom of Italy
- German atrocities committed against prisoners of war during World War II
