= Borowina, Puławy County =

Borowina
- Village
- Location within Poland
- Coordinates: 51°31′1″N 21°52′56″E
- Country: Poland
- Voivodeship: Lublin
- County: Puławy
- Gmina: Puławy
- Population: 100

Borowina [bɔrɔˈvina] is a village in the administrative district of Gmina Puławy, within Puławy County, Lublin Voivodeship, in eastern Poland.
