= Zarzecze, Puławy County =

Zarzecze
- Village
- Location within Poland
- Coordinates: 51°25′N 21°51′E
- Country: Poland
- Voivodeship: Lublin
- County: Puławy
- Gmina: Puławy
- Time zone: UTC+1 (CET)
  - Summer (DST): UTC+2 (CEST)
- Vehicle registration: LPU

Zarzecze [zaˈʐɛt͡ʂɛ] is a village in the administrative district of Gmina Puławy, within Puławy County, Lublin Voivodeship, in eastern Poland.

== History ==
In 1827, Zarzecze had a population of 89.

Following the joint German-Soviet invasion of Poland, which started World War II in September 1939, the village was occupied by Germany. The Germans operated a subcamp of the Stalag 307 prisoner-of-war camp in the village, which housed some 3,000-4,000 POWs.
