= Skoki, Puławy County =

Skoki
- Village
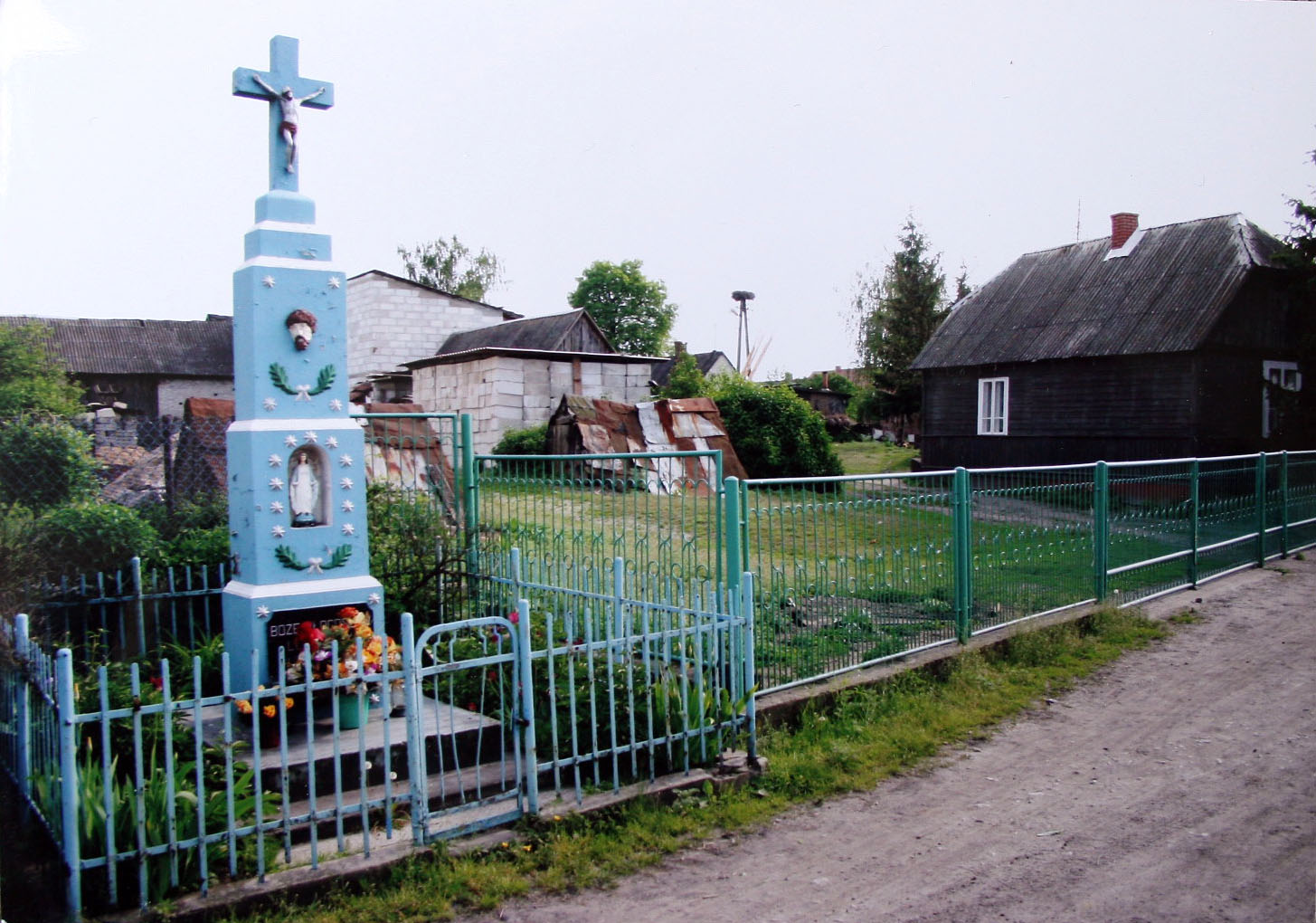
- A chapel in the village of Skoki in the Puławy County

- Location within Poland
- Coordinates: 51°32′21″N 21°51′30″E
- Country: Poland
- Voivodeship: Lublin
- County: Puławy
- Gmina: Puławy

Skoki [ˈskɔki] is a village in the administrative district of Gmina Puławy, within Puławy County, Lublin Voivodeship, in eastern Poland.
