= Matygi =

- Village
- Location within Poland
- Coordinates: 51°31′22″N 21°51′41″E
- Country: Poland
- Voivodeship: Lublin
- County: Puławy
- Gmina: Puławy

Matygi [maˈtɨɡi] is a village in the administrative district of Gmina Puławy, within Puławy County, Lublin Voivodeship, in eastern Poland.
