= Ewa Szelburg-Zarembina =

Polish writer (1899–1986)

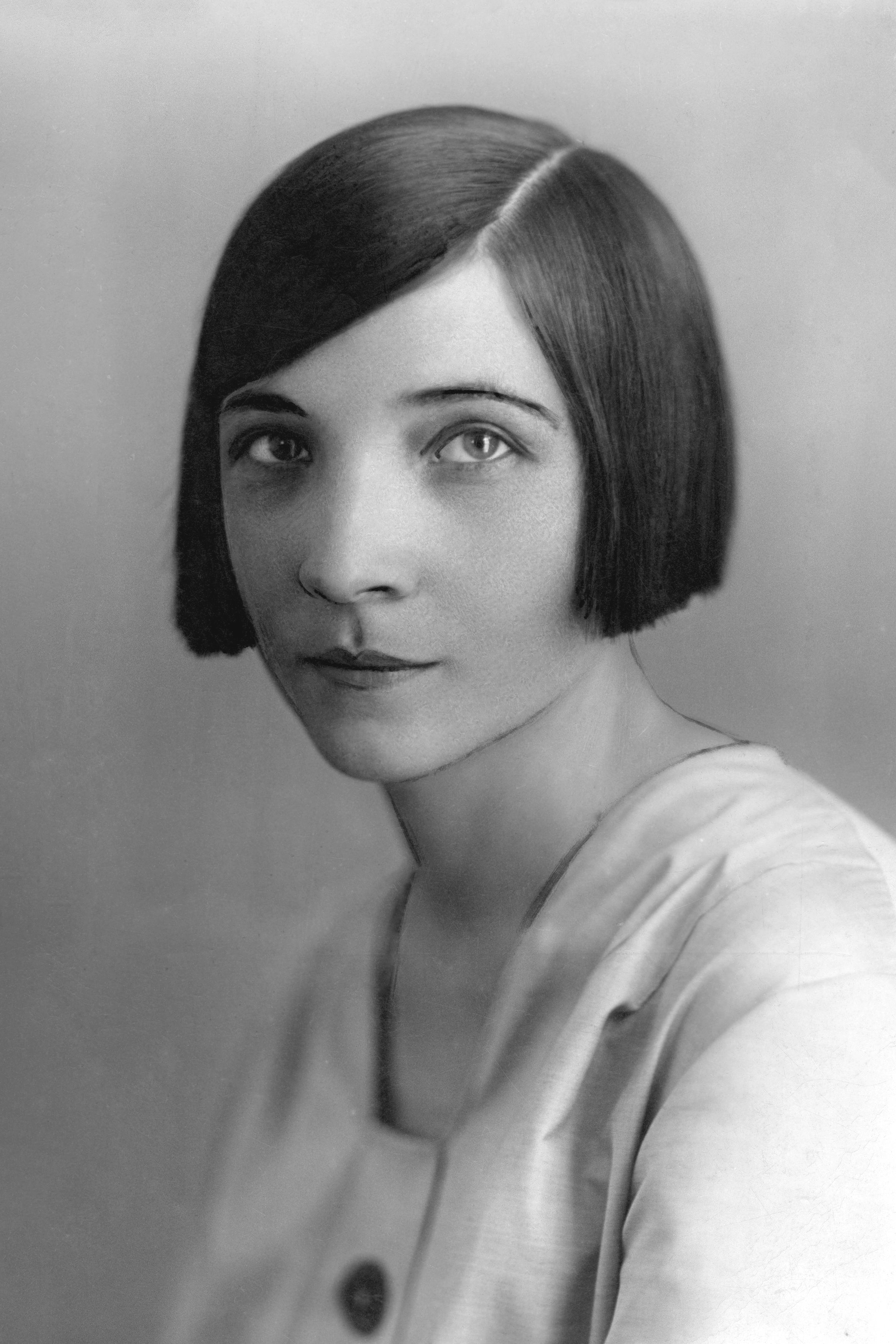
- Portrait of Szelburg-Zarembina, c.1925. From the National Digital Archives
- Born: April 10, 1899; Bronowice, Lublin Governorate, Congress Poland
- Died: September 28, 1986 (aged 87); Warsaw, Warsaw Voivodeship, Polish People's Republic
- Resting place: Nałęczów

Ewa Szelburg-Zarembina (10 April 1899 – 28 September 1986) was a Polish novelist, poet and screenplay writer who was born in Bronowice and died in Warsaw.

== Biography ==
Best known as author of numerous works for children, between 1922 and 1979 she published dozens of novels for children and adults alike, as well as hundreds of short stories, poems and other works. Between 1968 and 1976 she also headed the Chapter of the Order of the Smile. During that time (together with Seweryna Szmaglewska) she also initiated a fund gathering program that eventually led to the construction of the Children's Memorial Health Institute, the largest and most modern centre of paediatric care in Poland. In 1921, she married educator and writer Jerzy Ostrowski (1897–1942), divorced in 1926, and subsequently married the teacher Józef Zaremba. She was buried in Nałęczów.
