= Sadłowice, Lublin Voivodeship =

Sadłowice
- Village
- Location within Poland
- Coordinates: 51°22′48″N 21°56′34″E
- Country: Poland
- Voivodeship: Lublin
- County: Puławy
- Gmina: Puławy

Sadłowice [sadwɔˈvit͡sɛ] is a village in the administrative district of Gmina Puławy, within Puławy County, Lublin Voivodeship, in eastern Poland.
