= Coat of arms of Dęblin =

- Armiger: Dęblin
- Adopted: 2 March 1993 (current version); 1974 (first version)
- Shield: Blue Iberian style escutcheon
- Compartment: Eagle of Zeus, in form of a light gray (silver) eagle, which holds a yellow (golden) globe from which emerge four lightning bolts

The coat of arms of Dęblin, Poland depicts a depicts the Eagle of Zeus, in form of a light gray (silver) eagle, which holds a yellow (golden) globe from which emerge four lightning bolts, placed on a blue field. The flag of Dęblin is divided into three horizontal stripes, that are white, yellow, and blue, with the top and the bottom stripes are twice the size of the middle stripe. They are, from top to bottom, white, yellow, and blue. The current town symbols were introduced in 1993, and designed by Dariusz Dessauer. The original town coat of arms was introduced in 1974.

== Design ==
The coat of arms of Dęblin, Poland, consist of an Iberian-style escutcheon (shield). It depicts the Eagle of Zeus, in form of a light gray (silver) eagle, which holds a yellow (golden) globe from which emerge four lightning bolts.

== History ==
The coat of arms of Dęblin used from 1974 to 1993.

The first design of the coat of arms of Dęblin was introduced in 1974, in the commemoration of the 20th anniversary of the settlement receiving the town privileges in 1954. It consisted of an Iberian-style escutcheon (shield). The top portion of the shield, which had the height of 2/3 of the coat of arms, consisted a square field depicting a Air Force checkerboard, the military aircraft insignia of the Polish Air Force. It consisted of four equal squares, of which the upper left and lower right were red, and the other two, white. These were surrounded by a border of inverted (counterchanged) colors with 1/5 of the thickness of a single square. The bottom portion of the coat of arms, which had the height of 1/3 of the coat of arms, consisted of a blue field in the shape of a half of a circle, featuring two white (silver) horizontally-placed five-pointed stars.

Inclusion of the Air Force checkerboard referenced the association of the town with the aviation, as one of the places associated with aviation in Poland, and notably, home to the Polish Air Force University. The blue filed, also as a reference to aviation, the represented the sky. The two stars represented the 20th anniversary of the settlement receiving the town privileges in 1954, on which, in 1974, the coat of arms was created, with each star representing a decade.

On 2 March 1993, the design had been replaced with a new coat of arms, and accompanied with the introduction of the town flag. Both symbols were designed by Dariusz Dessauer. Both of the symbols are used to the present day.

== Flag of Dęblin ==
The civil flag of Dęblin.

The state flag of Dęblin.

The civil flag of Dęblin is a rectangle divided into three horizontal stripes, of which, the top and the bottom stripes are twice the size of the middle stripe. They are, from top to bottom, white, yellow, and blue. The flag's proportions, of its height to its width, are equal 5:8. The state flag features the coat of arms of Dęblin in the centre of the flag.
