= Borowa, Lublin Voivodeship =

Borowa
- Village
- Location within Poland
- Coordinates: 51°32′24″N 21°50′38″E
- Country: Poland
- Voivodeship: Lublin
- County: Puławy
- Gmina: Puławy

Borowa [bɔˈrɔva] is a village in the administrative district of Gmina Puławy, within Puławy County, Lublin Voivodeship, in eastern Poland.
