= Sosnów =

- Village
- Location within Poland
- Coordinates: 51°23′57″N 21°51′24″E
- Country: Poland
- Voivodeship: Lublin
- County: Puławy
- Gmina: Puławy

Sosnów [ˈsɔsnuf] is a village in the administrative district of Gmina Puławy, within Puławy County, Lublin Voivodeship, in eastern Poland.
