= Bronowice, Lublin Voivodeship =

Bronowice
- Village
- Location within Poland
- Coordinates: 51°27′N 21°55′E
- Country: Poland
- Voivodeship: Lublin
- County: Puławy
- Gmina: Puławy

Bronowice [brɔnɔˈvit͡sɛ] is a village in the administrative district of Gmina Puławy, within Puławy County, Lublin Voivodeship, in eastern Poland.
