= Dęblin Fortress =

- Twierdza Dęblin (Polish)
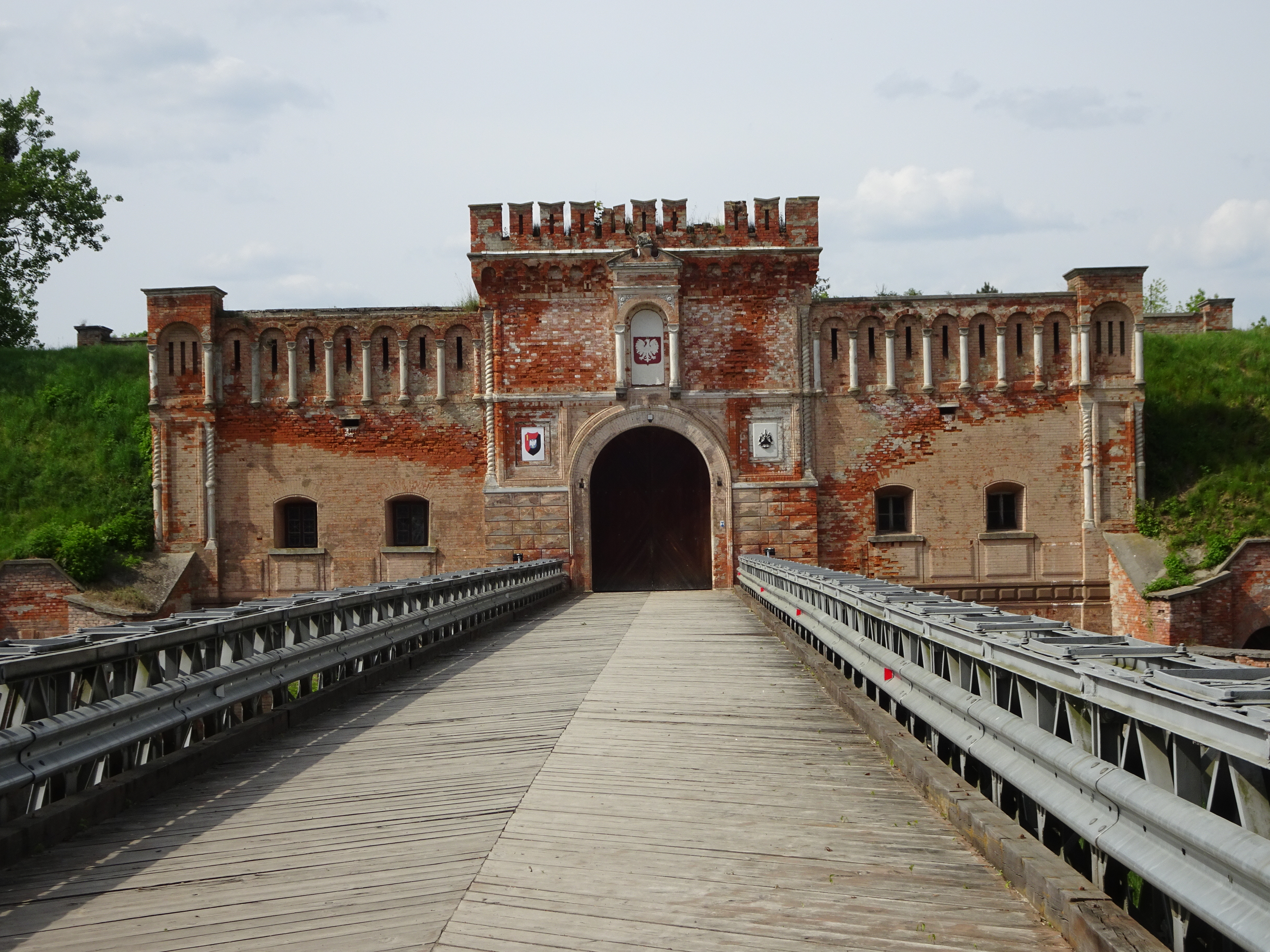
- Lublin Gate of the Dęblin Fortress
- Interactive map of the Dęblin Fortress area

General information
- Type: fortification
- Location: Dęblin, Poland
- Coordinates: 51°33′27″N 21°50′15″E
- Completed: 1847

Dęblin Fortress (Polish: Twierdza Dęblin, originally Ivangorod Fortress, Russian: Ивангородская крепость) refers to the 19th century fortifications in the town of Dęblin, Poland. Part of the fortress is used as a museum and the area is owned by the Polish military.

== History ==
The Ivangorod Fortress was constructed between 1837 and 1847, when the territory was located in the Russian Partition of Poland. In 1852–1853, Romuald Traugutt, future leader of the Polish January Uprising against Russian rule, did his military service in the fortress. The fortress was expanded in 1879–1885.

During World War I, from 1915, it was captured by the Austrians (see also Battle of the Vistula River), and later occupied by the Germans. With the end of the war, Poland regained independence and the fortress passed to the Polish Army. In the interbellum, it was the garrison of the Polish 15th Wolves Infantry Regiment.

During the German occupation of Poland (World War II), the Germans operated a prisoner-of-war camp in the fortress, designated at various times as Stalag 307 and Oflag 77. It held Polish, French, Dutch, Belgian, Senegalese, Soviet and Italian POWs.

In the post-war period, Polish Military Engineers have been stationed at the fortress.
