= Anielin, Puławy County =

Anielin
- Village
- Location within Poland
- Coordinates: 51°25′N 21°50′E
- Country: Poland
- Voivodeship: Lublin
- County: Puławy
- Gmina: Puławy

Anielin [aˈɲɛlin] is a village in the administrative district of Gmina Puławy, within Puławy County, Lublin Voivodeship, in eastern Poland.
