= Stalag 307 =

German World War II prisoner-of-war camp in occupied Poland

Stalag 307/Oflag 77
- Dęblin
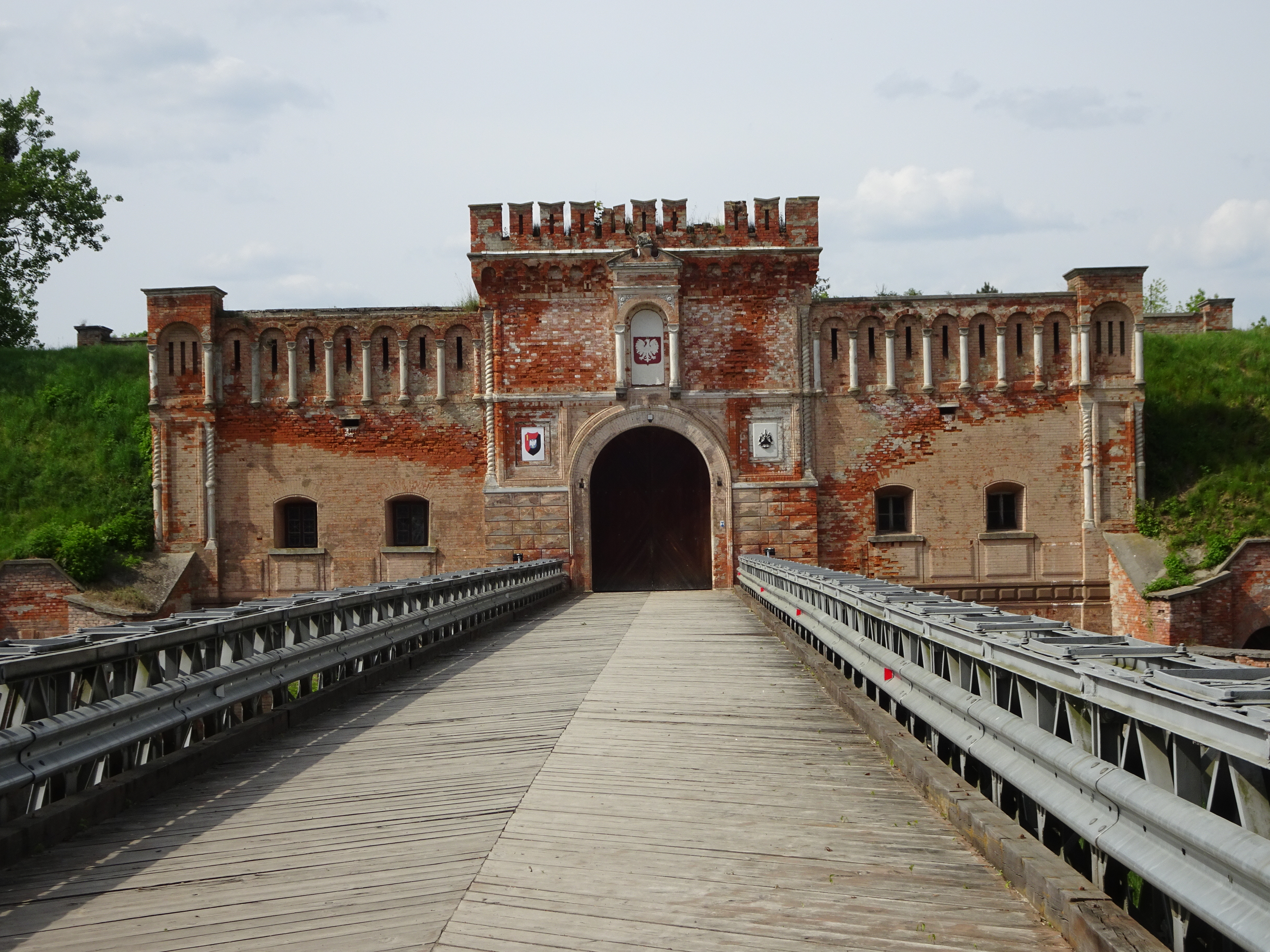
- Dęblin Fortress, which housed the camp

Site information
- Type: Prisoner-of-war camp
- Controlled by: Nazi Germany

Location
- Location within Poland
- Coordinates: 51°33′21″N 21°50′09″E

Site history
- In use: 1939–1944
- Battles/wars: World War II

Garrison information
- Occupants: Polish, French, Dutch, Belgian, Senegalese, Soviet and Italian POWs

Stalag 307 and Oflag 77 was a German prisoner-of-war camp operated during World War II in Dęblin in German-occupied Poland.

== History ==
The first POW camp was established in Dęblin by the German occupiers in 1939 for Polish troops of the Independent Operational Group Polesie taken prisoner during the German invasion of Poland that began World War II. Following the Battle of France, French, Dutch, Belgian and Senegalese POWs were brought to the camp. It was located in the Dęblin Fortress.

In April 1941, the Stalag 307 camp was established in Moosburg, then relocated to Kaliłów in May 1941, and finally to Dęblin in October 1941. While still in Kaliłów, abysmal living conditions and feeding rations caused widespread malnutrition and diseases, and there were also mass executions of POWs, including those attempting to escape. Some 13,000 POWs died there. In Dęblin, Stalag 307 housed French, Soviet and Italian prisoners. Overcrowding, poor food rations and sanitary conditions caused starvation and epidemics, resulting in a high mortality rate.

The camp had two subcamps, located in Zarzecze and Poniatowa.

In January 1944 Stalag 307 was reorganized into Oflag 77, and on August 19, 1944 it was dissolved.

Around 100,000 POWs died in the camp.

== Notable inmates ==
- Janusz Komorowski, Polish Olympic equestrian
