= Dęblin =

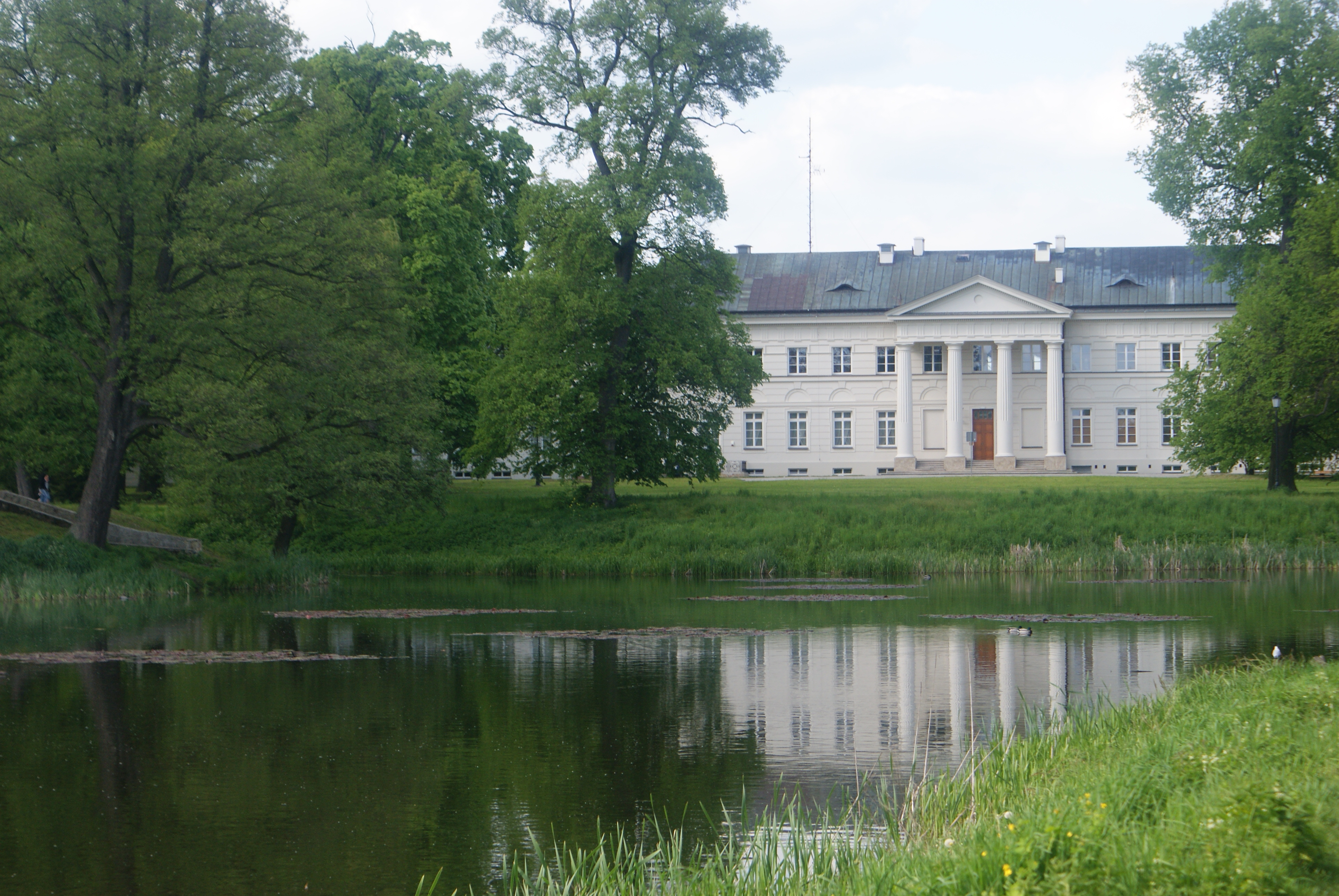
- Mniszech Palace and park

- Flag Coat of arms
- Interactive map of Dęblin
- Location within Poland
- Coordinates: 51°33′45″N 21°51′55″E
- Country: Poland
- Voivodeship: Lublin
- County: Ryki
- Gmina: Dęblin (urban gmina)
- First mentioned: 1397

Government
  - Mayor: Roman Dariusz Bytniewski (Ind.)

Area
  - Total: 38.33 km^{2} (14.80 sq mi)
- Elevation: 115 m (377 ft)

Population (31 December 2025)
  - Total: 13,669
  - Density: 356.6/km^{2} (923.6/sq mi)
- Time zone: UTC+1 (CET)
  - Summer (DST): UTC+2 (CEST)
- Postal code: 08-530
- Area code: +48 81
- Car plates: LRY
- Website: www.deblin.pl

Dęblin [ˈdɛmblʲin] is a town at the confluence of Vistula and Wieprz rivers, in Lublin Voivodeship, Poland. Dęblin is the part of the agglomeration with adjacent towns of Ryki and Puławy, which together have over 100,000 inhabitants. The population of the town itself is 13,669 (December 2025). Dęblin is part of the historic region of Lesser Poland. Since 1927 it has been the home of the chief Polish Air Force Academy (Polish: Lotnicza Akademia Wojskowa), and as such Dęblin is one of the most important places associated with aviation in Poland. The town is also a key railroad junction, located along the major Warsaw – Kyiv line, with two additional connections stemming from Dęblin – one westwards to Radom, and another one northeast to Łuków.

== History ==
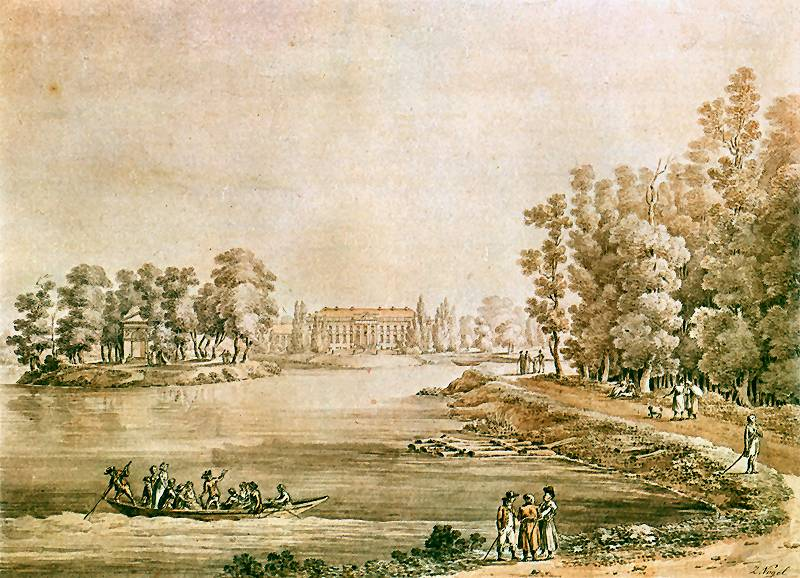
18th-century view of the palace and park

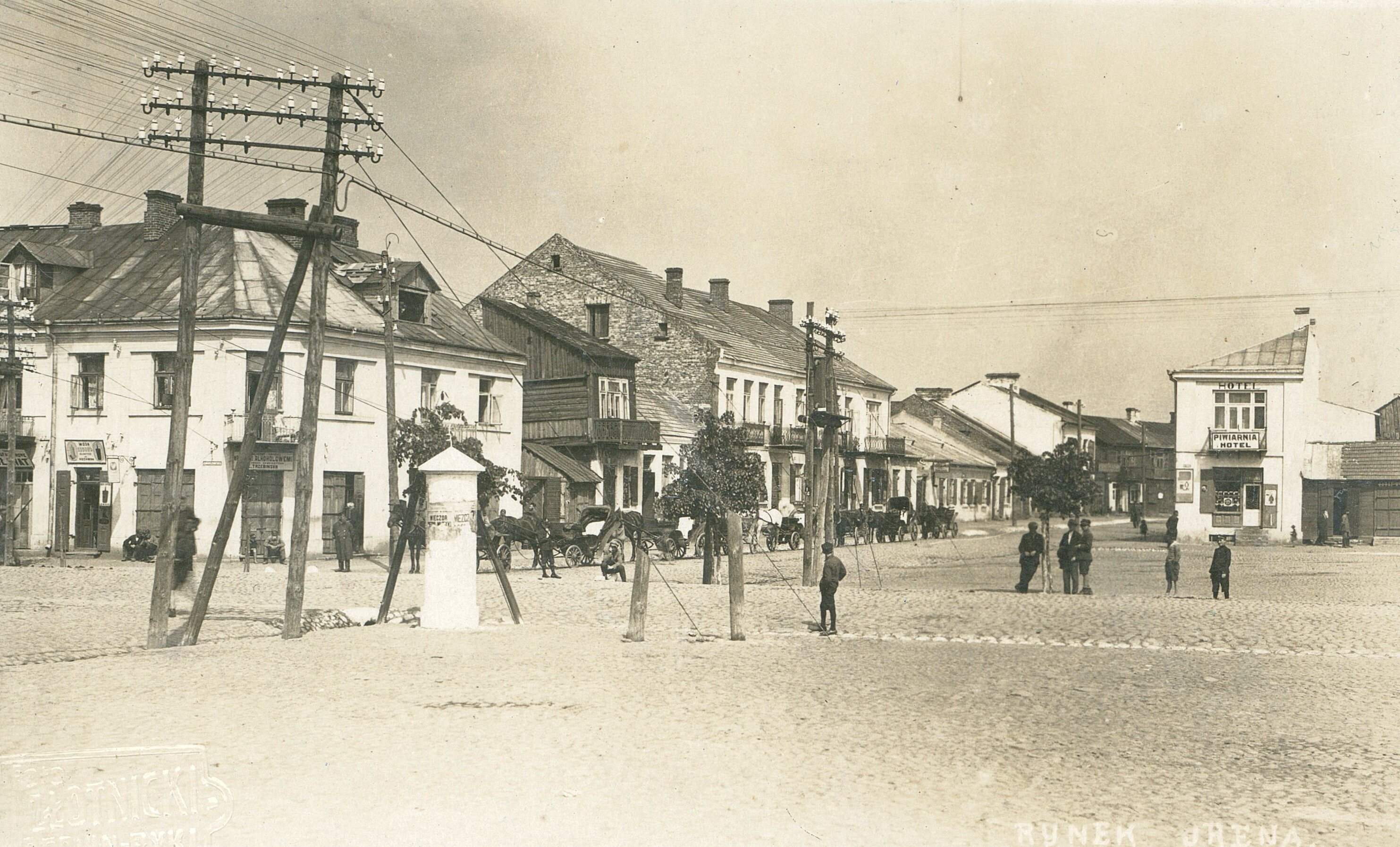
Market place ca 1928

Dęblin was first mentioned as a village in historical documents dating from 1397. At that time, it was ruled by Castellans from Sieciechów. It was a private village of Polish nobility, including the Mniszech family, administratively located in the Stężyca County in the Sandomierz Voivodeship in the Lesser Poland Province of the Kingdom of Poland.

It was annexed by Austria in the Third Partition of Poland in 1795. Following the Austro-Polish War of 1809, it was regained by Poles and included within the short-lived Duchy of Warsaw. After the duchy's dissolution in 1815, it became part of Russian-controlled Congress Poland. The settlement was still owned by Polish nobility until 1836 when it was taken over by the Russian government following the unsuccessful Polish November Uprising. In 1840 the village was handed to Russian field marshal Ivan Paskievich, who played a prominent role in the suppression of the November Uprising. From then on until the end of Russian rule in this part of Poland (1915) Dęblin was often referred to by its new Russian name of Ivangorod.

In the years after the November Uprising the military significance of the Dęblin site, at the confluence of two important rivers (the Vistula and the Wieprz), was noted. In the years 1838–1845 the Ivangorod fortress was constructed, sited to protect a crossing across the Vistula. After 1859 the fortress was further expanded. In the early 1880s a railway line connecting Lublin with Silesia was built, with a bridge over the Vistula passing near the fortress, further enhancing its importance. In 1854 the core of the present-day town, at its founding named the Irena Colony, was established. It kept its name until 1953 when it was incorporated into the town of Dęblin. During the January Uprising, on 26 September 1863, it was the site of a skirmish between Polish insurgents and Russian troops.

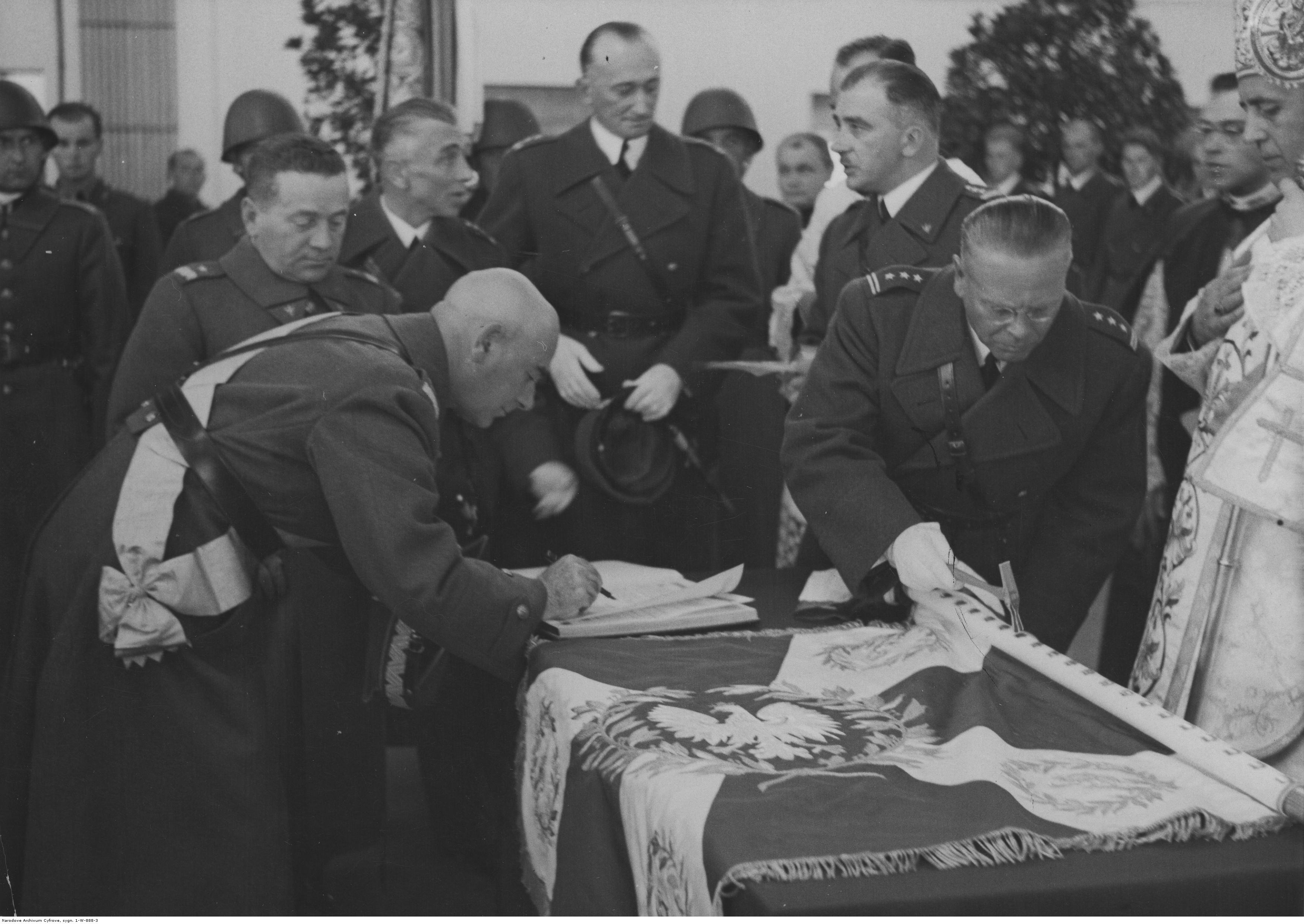
10th anniversary of the Polish Air Force Academy in Dęblin, 1937

The fortress played a role in World War I. In October 1914 a significant battle was fought in its vicinity, in which the Russian armies repelled a combined German and Austro-Hungarian offensive. After that battle the defences of the fortress were further improved, and it became even more important as an anchor of the Russian position on the Vistula. However, reverses elsewhere along the front forced the Russians to abandon Ivangorod in August 1915. In 1920, the Dęblin area was the starting point for a Polish offensive that decided the fate of the Battle of Warsaw and the entire Polish–Soviet War. Polish leader Józef Piłsudski stayed in the town on 12–13 August 1920, shortly before the Battle of Warsaw. In the years 1918–1939, as part of independent Poland, Dęblin continued to have large military significance. The Dęblin fortress was garrisoned by the 15th Wolves Infantry Regiment of the Polish Army, and in the nearby village of Stawy one of the largest ammunition depots of the Polish Army (Główna Składnica Uzbrojenia nr. 2) was located. In 1927 the famous Polish Air Force academy was officially moved to Dęblin, after its founding in Grudziądz in 1925 (some pilot training has been conducted here since 1920). It continues to function today.

During the invasion of Poland, which started World War II, Dęblin was captured by the Wehrmacht on 15 September 1939. Under the German occupation, its Jewish population, which constituted over 60% of the total inhabitants, perished during the Holocaust. Dęblin was a location of a German prisoner-of-war camp for Polish, French, Dutch, Belgian, Senegalese, Soviet and Italian POWs, designated at various times as Stalag 307 and Oflag 77. The commander of the Stawy Ammunition Depot and four instructors of the Polish Air Force academy were murdered by the Russians in Kharkiv during the Katyn massacre in 1940. Dęblin was seized by the Red Army on 25–26 July 1944, and was eventually restored to Poland.

In the postwar years Dęblin was rebuilt and expanded. It received its town charter in 1954.

=== Stawy Ammunition Depot ===
Stawy, now a district of Dęblin, was a separate settlement in the Second Polish Republic. It is located along rail line from Dęblin to Ryki, among pine forests. Stawy has a population of 500.

In January 1921, construction of Ammunition Plant began in local forests. The name of the plan was soon changed into Main Ammunition Depot Nr. 2. At that time, the location of the depot was not named, it was simply called "Forest Barracks". On 1 July 1924 Minister of Military Affairs, General Władysław Sikorski officially changed the name Forest Barracks into Stawy.

The depot at Stawy was one of the largest such facilities in the interbellum Poland. During the Invasion of Poland, it provided ammunition to the fighting troops. In late September 1939, General Franciszek Kleeberg, commander of Independent Operational Group Polesie ordered his soldiers to march to Stawy, and capture the depot. Kleeberg however did not know that in mid-September the depot was blown up by order of General Stefan Dąb-Biernacki, commander of the Polish Northern Front (1939). The operation was carried out by soldiers of the 39th Infantry Division (General Bruno Olbrycht). Nevertheless, Kleeberg and his soldiers failed to capture Stawy, as they capitulated in early October 1939, after the Battle of Kock (1939).

== Symbols ==
The flag of Dęblin consists of three stripes: upper silver (white), middle gold, and lower blue, with the silver and blue zones occupying two fifths each and gold one-fifth of the flag height.

== Tourist attractions ==
Sights of Dęblin

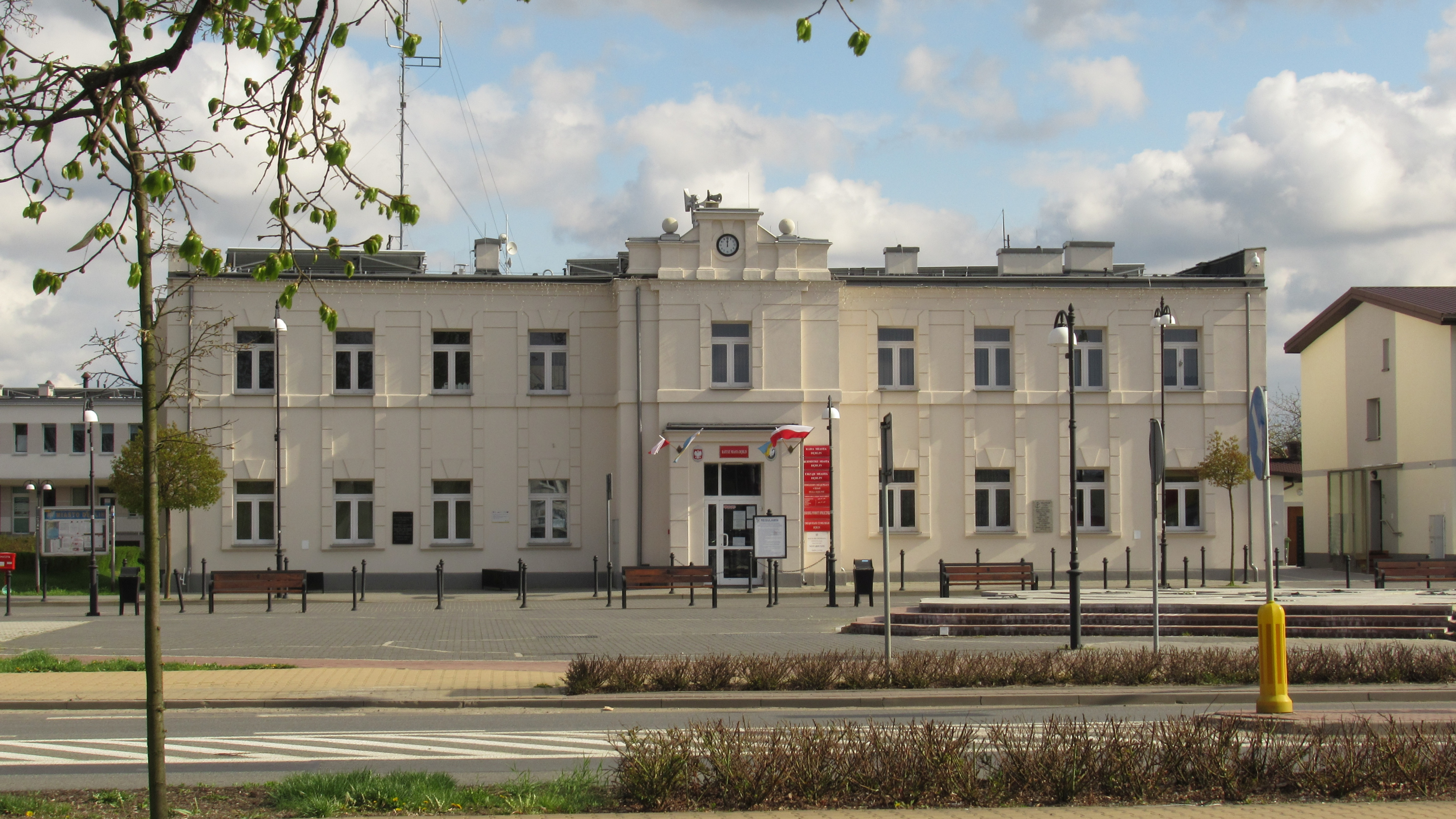
Town hall

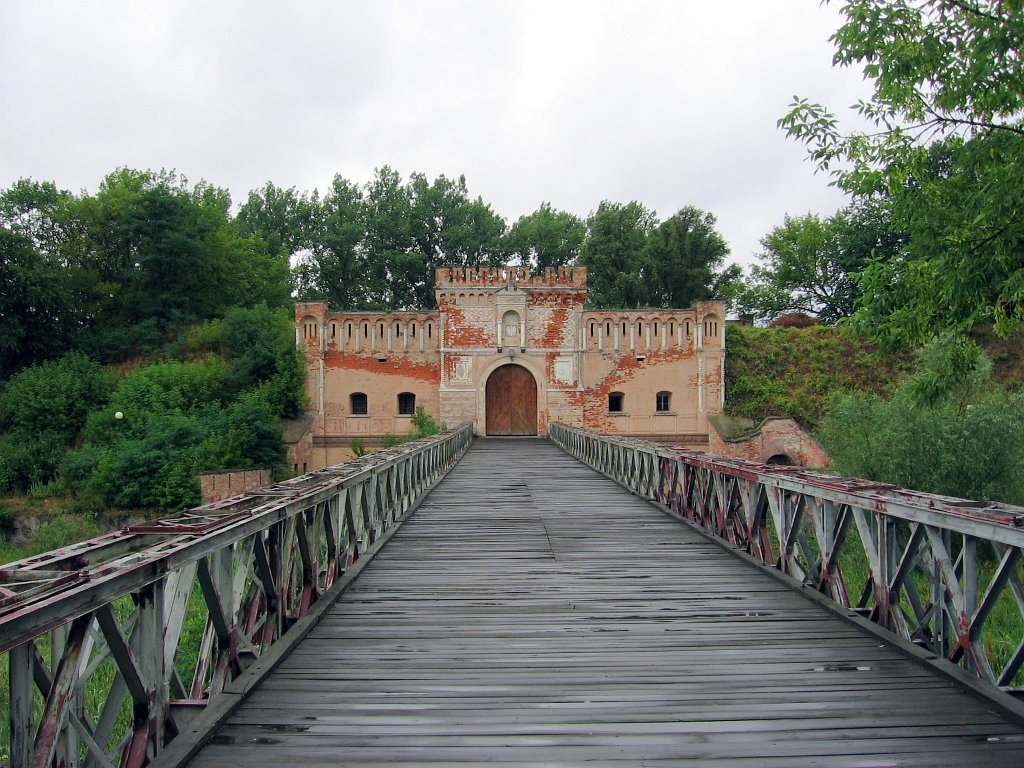
Dęblin Fortress

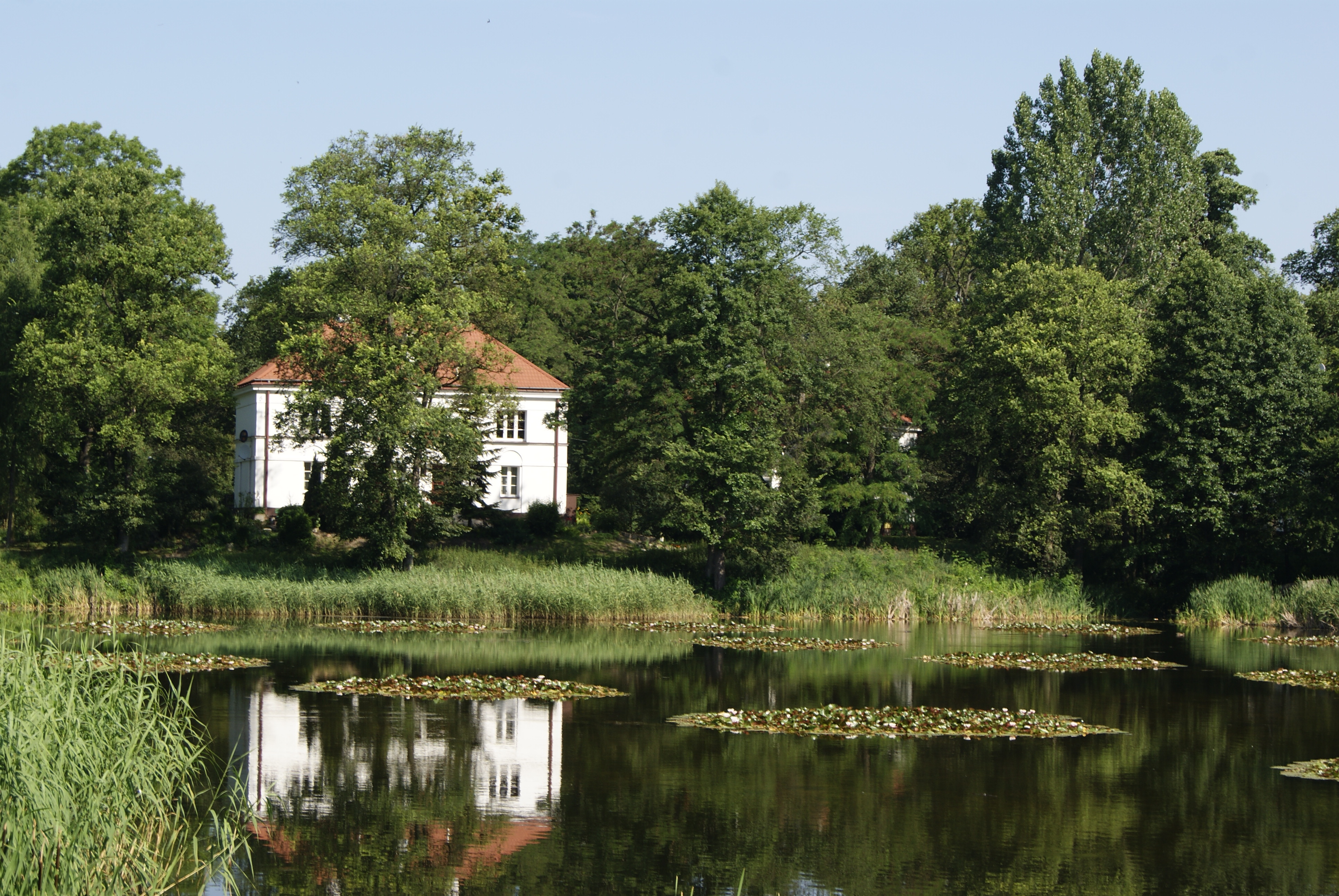
Park

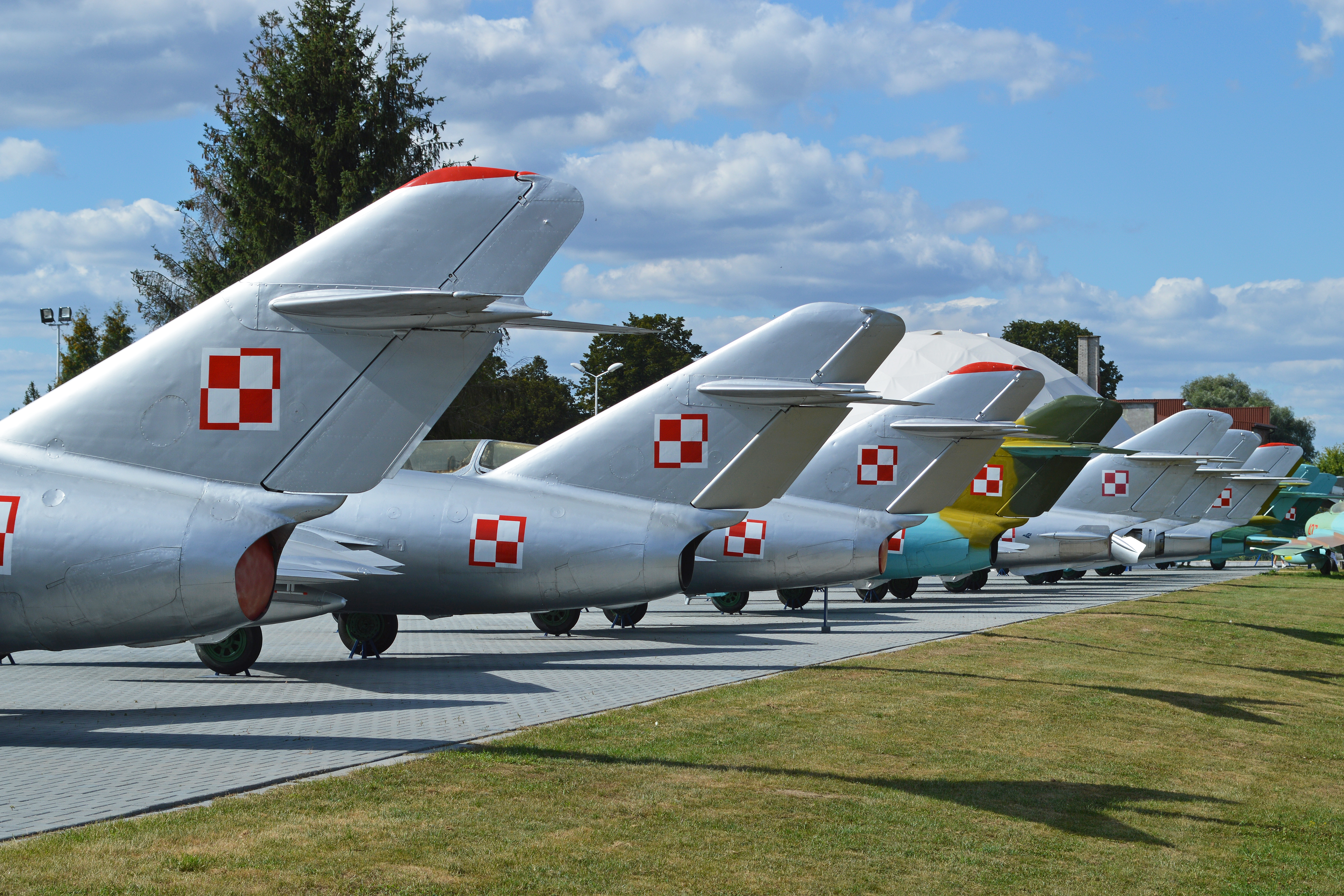
Polish Air Force Museum

- Dęblin Fortress
- Mniszech Palace and park
- Polish Air Force Museum (Muzeum Sił Powietrznych w Dęblinie)

== Sports ==
Dęblin is home to a football club Czarni Dęblin. It competes in the lower leagues.

== People associated with Dęblin ==
- Ignatz Bubis (1927–1999), activist
- Andrzej Jajszczyk (born 1952), scientist
- Konstantin Kaufman (1818–1882), Governor-General of Russian Turkestan
- Michael Alfred Peszke (1932–2015), Polish-American psychiatrist and historian
- Witold Urbanowicz (1908–1996), fighter ace of the Second World War

== Other ==
In the Chicago suburb of Oak Lawn, Illinois, which has a high concentration of Polish Americans, one of the streets bears the name of Dęblin Lane.

== See also ==
- 1st Flying Training Centre
